= Cassandra, Lady Hawke =

- Born: February 28, 1746; Ambrosden
- Died: November 13, 1813 (aged 67)
- Spouse(s): Martin Hawke, 2nd Baron Hawke
- Children: Cassandra Julia Hawke, Annabella Eliza Cassandra Hawke, Edward Hawke-Harvey, 3rd Baron Hawke of Towton, Martin Bladen Edward Hawke
- Parent(s): Sir Edward Turner, 2nd Baronet; Cassandra Leigh

Cassandra, Lady Hawke (February 28, 1746 – November 13, 1813) was a British novelist and Baroness Hawke of Towton. Her only published novel was the two-volume sentimental romance Julia de Gramont (1788), published under the name The Right Honorable Lady H***. She was the second cousin of novelist Jane Austen.

She was born Cassandra Turner on February 28, 1746 in Ambrosden, Oxfordshire, the youngest of eight children of Sir Edward Turner, 2nd Baronet and Cassandra Leigh. Her mother was one of three first cousins born with the name Cassandra Leigh, the others being Cassandra Austen, Jane Austen's mother, and novelist Cassandra Cooke. In 1777, Cassandra Turner married barrister Martin Bladen Hawke, who became the 2nd Baron Hawke in 1781.

Julia de Gramont was published in 1788. It was generally well reviewed and was translated into French and German. Dissenters included an anonymous review in Analytical Review, thought to be by Mary Wollstonecraft, which said that its "preposterous incidents, and absurd sentiments, can only be equalled by the affected and unintelligible phrases the author has laboriously culled," followed by a list of twenty examples of such. Fanny Burney wrote that it was "all of a piece—all love, love, love, unmixed and unadulterated with any more worldly materials." It was one of the works parodied by William Bickford in Modern Novel Writing, or, The Elegant Enthusiast (1796), which lifted over four paragraphs from Julia de Gramont.

In her diaries, Fanny Burney recounts an awkward 1782 meeting with Lady Hawke and her sister Elizabeth, Lady Saye and Sele (wife of Thomas Twisleton, 13th Baron Saye and Sele). Lady Saye and Sele proclaimed that Burney and Hawke were "sister authoresses" and bragged about her sister's unpublished novel, then titled The Mausoleum of Julia. In 1788, Burney wrote that Queen Charlotte told her that she had been sent a published novel by Lady Hawke. Burney wrote "'I hope,' cried I, 'tis not the Mausoleum of Julia'! But yes, it proved no less!"

Cassandra, Lady Hawke died on 13 November 1813.

== Bibliography ==
- Julia de Gramont. B. White and Son, 1788.
