= Blackthorn, Oxfordshire =

Village in Oxfordshire, England

Coordinates: 51.869°N 1.099°W

Blackthorn
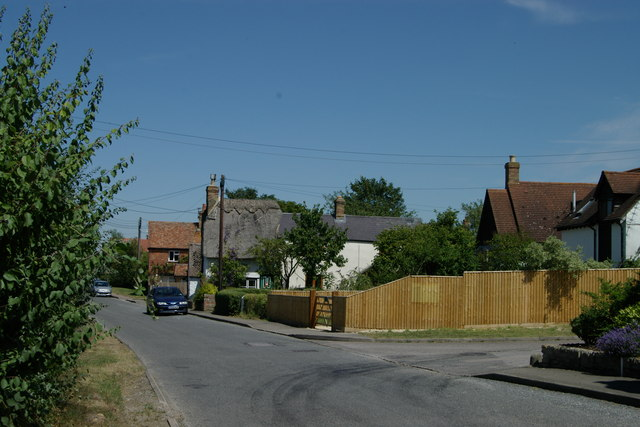
- Part of Blackthorn village

- Location within Oxfordshire
- Population: 317 (2011 Census)
- OS grid reference: SP6219
- District: Cherwell
- Shire county: Oxfordshire
- Region: South East
- Country: England
- Sovereign state: United Kingdom
- Post town: Bicester
- Postcode district: OX25
- Dialling code: 01869
- Police: Thames Valley
- Fire: Oxfordshire
- Ambulance: South Central
- UK Parliament: Bicester and Woodstock
- Website: Blackthorn Village Oxfordshire

Blackthorn is a village and civil parish in the Cherwell District of Oxfordshire about 3 miles (5 km) southeast of Bicester. The parish is bounded by the River Ray to the south, tributaries of the Ray to the east and north and field boundaries to the west. The parish's eastern boundary forms part of the county's with Buckinghamshire.

The old village lies between the A41 and B4011 main roads. Newer housing on the east side of the neighbouring village of Ambrosden is in the parish of Blackthorn. The 2011 Census recorded a parish population of 317.

== Early history ==
Iron Age pottery has been found at Blackthorn. The course of Akeman Street Roman road passes through the parish, which may explain why Roman pottery has also been found here. The stretch of Akeman Street through the parish is now part of the A41 trunk road.

== Manor ==
Blackthorn's toponym is derived from the Old English blaec-þorn or -þyrne.

In 1279 Blackthorn was recorded as a dependent hamlet of Ambrosden. In 1194 Ambrosden and Blackthorn were recorded as part of the honour of St. Valery. As such, Blackthorn would have descended to Edmund, 2nd Earl of Cornwall, who in 1288 gave Ambrosden (including Blackthorn) to Ashridge Priory of the Augustinian order of the Brothers of Penitence. In 1539 the priory was dissolved in the Dissolution of the Monasteries and surrendered its lands to the Crown.

The Crown seems to have separated Blackthorn from Ambrosden and sold them off separately. However, John Denton, lord of the manor of one of the manors of Bicester bought both of them: Ambrosden from Henry VIII's agents in 1542 and Blackthorn from Elizabeth I in 1564. Blackthorn later passed to the Nourse family of Woodeaton, and in 1636 Philippa Nourse and her son John conveyed Blackthorn to Edward Rudge. Between 1706 and 1713 the manor changed hands three times, by which time it belonged to a Sebastian Smythe. In 1752 Smythe left it to his daughter Barbara Smythe of Cuddesdon, who in 1787 left it to Sir John Whalley-Gardiner, 1st Baronet of Roche Court, Fareham, Hampshire (1743–97). Blackthorn then changed hands a number of times. By the 1820s Alderman Richard Cox of Oxford owned it and in 1852 James Morrell, presumably of the Morrells Brewery family, was lord of the manor.

== Church and chapel ==
In 1820 the Home Missionary Society sent a Congregationalist missionary to Blackthorn, where he held services in an old bakery. By 1844 services were being held in someone's house and finally in 1870 a Congregational chapel was completed. The building was replaced by a new chapel in 1926, which was still being used for worship in 1944 and through until at least the late 1970s. It is now a private house.

The Church of England parish of Ambrosden includes Blackthorn, which therefore does not have its own Church of England parish church. However, Rev. Charles Bagshawe, who was vicar of Ambosden 1866–1884, ran a mission room in Blackthorn. The mission room has since closed and Blackthorn has reverted to being served by the parish church of St. Mary the Virgin, 1.5 miles (2.4 km) away in Ambrosden, part of the Benefice of the Ray Valley.

The Church Charity was a local charity that let out land and property in Blackthorn to pay for the upkeep of Ambrosden Parish Church. The charity is known to have been in existence by 1336, when it owned two cottages, a close and half a yardland. In 1825 it owned one cottage, a close and 25 acres (10 ha).

== Economic and social history ==
Blackthorn Inclosure Act 1776
- Act of Parliament
- Parliament of Great Britain
- Long title: An Act for dividing and enclosing the Open and Common Fields, Common Pastures, Common Meadows, and Commonable Lands, within the Township, Hamlet, Precincts, or Liberties, of Blackthorn, in the Parish of Ambrosden, in the County of Oxford.
- Citation: 16 Geo. 3. c. 21 Pr
- Territorial extent: Great Britain

Dates
- Royal assent: 22 March 1776
- Commencement: 26 October 1775 (Note: Start of session.)

Status: Current legislation

Although Blackthorn was a hamlet of Ambrosden it had a separate open field system. The Rector of Ashridge was allowed to inclose 3 acres (1.2 ha) of pasture at Blackthorn in 1299, but the open fields and remaining common lands survived until in 1774 the 36 yardlanders of Blackthorn petitioned for an inclosure act. Three yardlanders and the lady of the manor, Barbara Smythe, opposed enclosure. The petitioners were successful, the Blackthorn Inclosure Act 1776 (16 Geo. 3. c. 21 Pr). was passed, and the parish lands were enclosed in 1776.

In the 17th century the game of running at the quintain was played on the village green. Singlestick matches were held on Blackthorn Hill in the 18th century but are said to have ceased by 1823.

Stone Pits Farm in the parish is named after a quarry that supplied limestone for building. In the 1740s stone from here was used to build Ambrosden House for Sir Edward Turner, 2nd Baronet. In 1819 a brick and tile works was opened in the parish. Both the quarry and the brick and tile works were still in business by the end of the 19th century but were disused by 1957.

There was a windmill on Blackthorn Hill by 1809, and Ordnance Survey maps from 1880 onwards showed two windmills on the hill. They were tower mills, distinguished as "East" and "West" mill. West Mill had a rendered exterior and a fantail; by the early 1980s its remains had been reduced to the lower part of the tower. East Mill was tile-hung, has lost its sails and cap, but the tower survives.

Towards the end of the 18th century Blackthorn experienced increases in both population and poverty. An agricultural depression followed, and the Church Charity responded by reducing its land rents in Blackthorn in 1805 and again between 1822 and 1830. Overcrowding and an insanitary water supply led to a cholera epidemic in 1823 that killed at least 27 people. However, the population continued to increase, partly because Blackthorn was an "open village" where it was easy for paupers from outside the parish to move in. The 1851 Census recorded a population peak of 417, but in subsequent decades it declined.

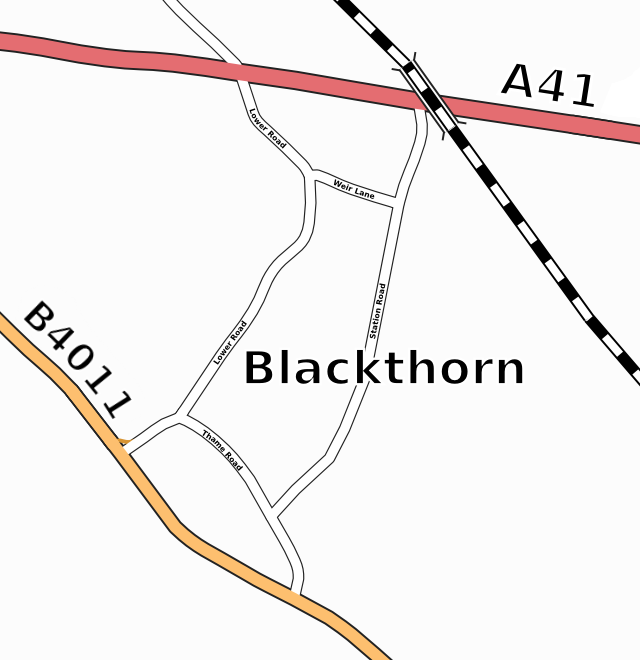
Blackthorn road layout (from OpenStreetMap)

A parish school was opened in Ambrosden in 1818. It seems to have ceased operating by 1854, but a temporary school existed in Ambrosden in 1868. A permanent parish school built in Ambrosden was opened in 1876 and by the same year a school was operating in Blackthorn. By 1920 Blackthorn school was teaching children up to the age of 11, while older children from Blackthorn attended the school at Ambrosden. In 1952 Blackthorn school was still open but had only 16 pupils. It has since closed.

Blackthorn village is on the road between Bicester and Thame. In 1833 an Act of Parliament made the road into a turnpike. The turnpike trust rebuilt Blackthorn Bridge over the River Ray, replacing a wooden structure with the present stone bridge.

In about 1910 the Great Western Railway built a new main line linking Ashendon Junction and King's Sutton to complete a new high-speed route between its termini at London Paddington and Birmingham Snow Hill. The line passes within a few hundred yards of Blackthorn and crosses Akeman Street on a steel bridge just north of the village. The GWR opened Blackthorn railway station on the north side of the bridge. British Railways closed the station in 1953, but the railway remains open as part of the Chiltern Main Line.

Blackthorn had two public houses: The Rose and Crown which closed in 1994, and The Royal Oak which closed some years previously. It had a butcher's shop and a garage but these too have closed.

In 2002 Blackthorn celebrated Queen Elizabeth II's Golden Jubilee with a fête opened by its own Queen of Blackthorn (a young village girl) who paraded around the village and greeted every visitor with a kiss.

== Amenities ==
Blackthorn has a village hall. The village holds two or three public events annually including the village fête, a summer barbecue and often another event, for example for Halloween or carols for Christmas.

Blackthorn has infrequent bus services: routes 30 and 94 operated by Charlton on Otmoor Services. The Chiltern Main Line between Birmingham Snow Hill and London Marylebone passes through the village, but there is no station stop that serves the village.

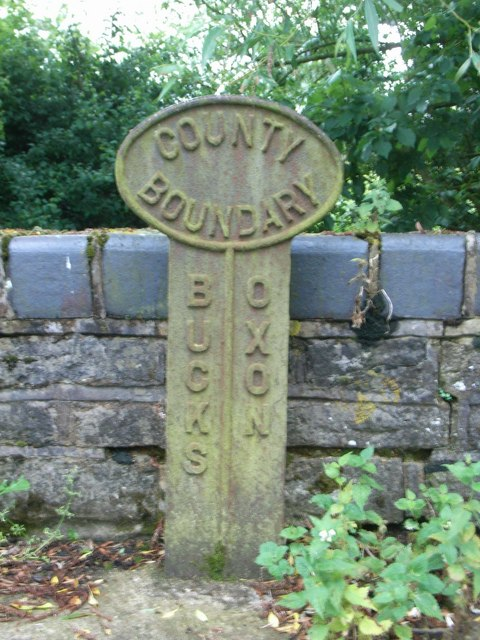
County boundary marker on the eastern boundary of Blackthorn parish

== Bibliography ==
- Foreman, Wilfrid (1983). Oxfordshire Mills. Chichester: Phillimore & Co Ltd. pp. 92, 124. ISBN 0-85033-441-1.
- Lobel, Mary D, ed. (1957). A History of the County of Oxford. Victoria County History. Vol. 5: Bullingdon Hundred. London: Oxford University Press for the Institute of Historical Research. pp. 15–30.
