= Sir Edward Turner, 1st Baronet =

Sir Edward Turner, Bt
- Born: Edward Turner; 1691
- Died: 1735
- Spouse: Mary Page
- Children: Sir Edward Turner, 2nd Baronet

Sir Edward Turner, 1st Baronet (1691 – 1735) was an 18th-century investor, landowner and baronet.

He was born in London the son of John Turner, a well-to-do London merchant (d. 1708) and educated at Bicester Grammar School. Like his father, he became a merchant in London, a Director and sometime Chairman of the East India Company. He served a year as the High Sheriff of Oxfordshire in 1732.

In 1718 he married Mary Page, the daughter of Sir Gregory Page, 1st Baronet, who was a "merchant prince" with great wealth from the British East India Company. Both Turner and his father-in-law invested in the South Sea Company, but when the company's stock had risen in price in the South Sea Bubble, they sold their shareholdings at a profit before the price crashed in 1720.

Both men then invested their increased wealth in land. Turner bought two manors in Oxfordshire from Sir Stephen Glynne, 3rd Baronet: one of the manors of Bicester in 1728 and then the manor of Ambrosden in 1729.

Turner was made 1st Baronet of Ambrosden in 1733. He died in 1735 and was succeeded by his son Sir Edward Turner, 2nd Baronet.

== Sources ==
- Lobel, Mary D, ed. (1957). A History of the County of Oxford: Volume 5: Bullingdon hundred. Victoria County History. pp. 15–30.
- Lobel, Mary D, ed. (1959). A History of the County of Oxford, Volume 6. Victoria County History. pp. 14–56.

Baronetage of Great Britain
| New creation | Baronet (of Ambrosden); 1733–1735 | Succeeded by Edward Turner |
