= Piddington, Oxfordshire =

Village in Oxfordshire, England

Coordinates: 51.852°N 1.071°W

Piddington
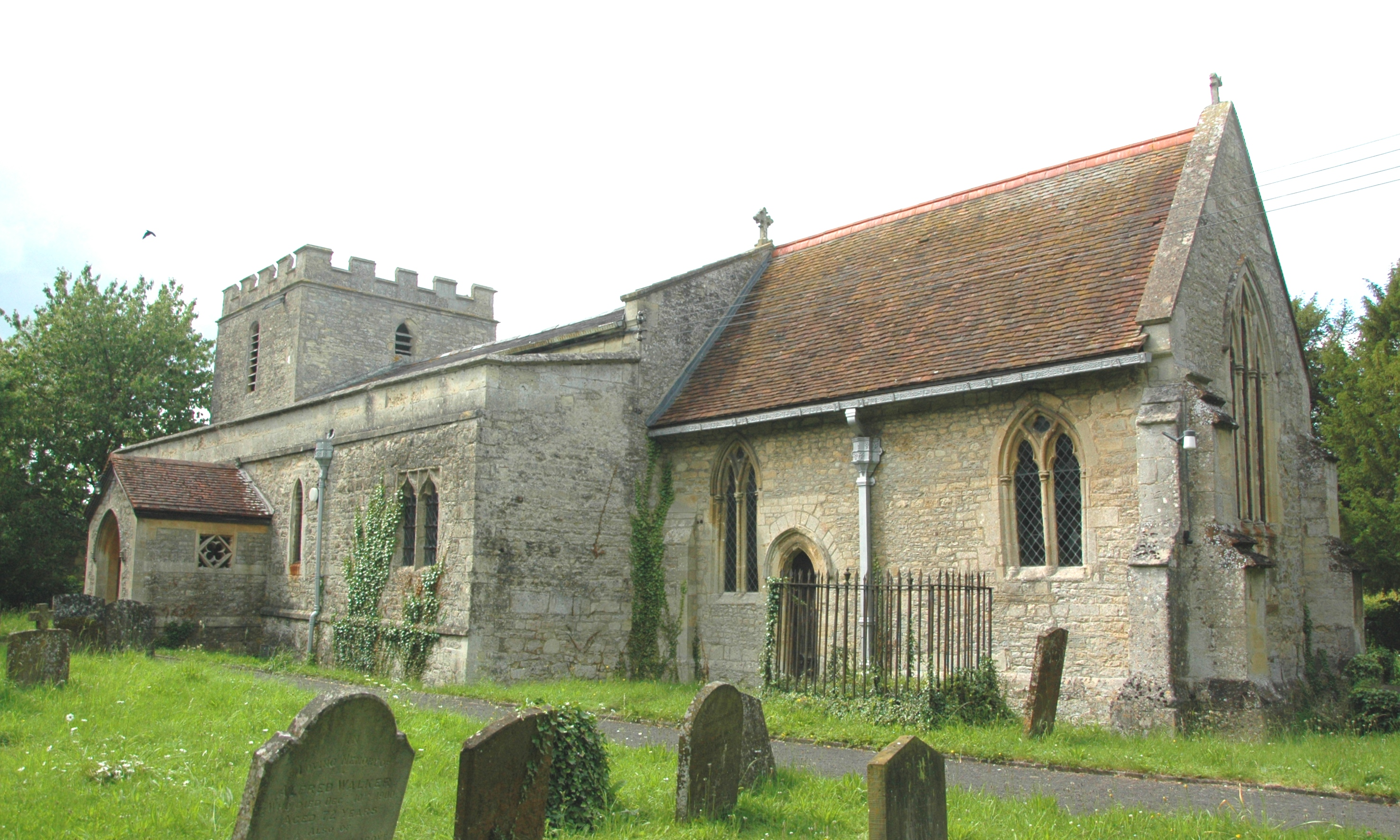
- St. Nicholas' parish church

- Location within Oxfordshire
- Area: 9.53 km^{2} (3.68 sq mi)
- Population: 358 (2021 census)
  - Density: 38/km^{2} (98/sq mi)
- OS grid reference: SP6417
- Civil parish: Piddington
- District: Cherwell
- Shire county: Oxfordshire
- Region: South East
- Country: England
- Sovereign state: United Kingdom
- Post town: Bicester
- Postcode district: OX25
- Dialling code: 01869
- Police: Thames Valley
- Fire: Oxfordshire
- Ambulance: South Central
- UK Parliament: Bicester and Woodstock

Piddington is a village, about 4.5 miles (7 km) southeast of Bicester in Oxfordshire, England. It lies close to the border with Buckinghamshire. The 2021 census recorded the parish's population as 358. The village name is derived from the Old English meaning "farm/settlement connected with Pyda".

The village made national news headlines in September 2026 for a symbolic referendum in which residents voted in favour of leaving the United Kingdom, in response to the government's plans to house 1,250 asylum seekers at nearby MOD Bicester, a former military base. In November 2026, the government granted planning permission for the base's conversion, with the village announcing that they will be launching a legal challenge against the decision.

== Manor ==
Just before the Norman Conquest of England, Hacun, a Dane, held the manor of Piddington, and also the nearby manor of Merton. The Domesday Book records that by 1086 Judith, Countess of Huntingdon, a niece of William I of England held the manor. After the Revolt of the Earls in 1075 Judith's husband Waltheof, Earl of Northumbria was executed and William the Conqueror betrothed her to Simon I de Senlis. She refused to marry him and fled England, so William confiscated her estates and allowed Simon to marry Judith's eldest daughter Maud. Simon received estates including Merton and Piddington as part of the honour of Huntingdon.

In 1152 Simon II de Senlis inherited Piddington and almost immediately granted it to St Frideswide's Priory in Oxford. In 1153 Simon II died, and his heir King Malcolm IV of Scotland, confirmed the grant of Piddington to the Priory. However, Malcolm's heir-apparent William the Lion took Piddington back from the Priory. In about 1174 Henry II deprived William of all his titles and lands in England and granted the Earldom of Huntingdon to Simon III de Senlis. Simon acknowledged the Priory's claim to Piddington but continued to hold the overlordship himself, even ignoring a Papal bull upholding the Priory's rights.

Joan of Piddington had held the manor of Simon II de Senlis, and in about 1183 she married Aubrey de Dammartin, son of Albéric I de Mello and Dammartin, Grand Chamberman of France. After Aubrey's death the Crown held Piddington in escheat for several years before it passed to his heir, Reynold de Dammartin. In the Anglo-French War of 1202–14 Reynold supported Philip II of France against King John, for which he was deprived of his English estates. In 1213 Reynold's estates were restored but when he died in 1227 Henry III seized them again.

In 1270 Henry III granted Piddington to a Breton, Alan Plukenet, in exchange for a manor in the New Forest. In 1309 his son, Alan II, granted Piddington to Hugh le Despenser, 1st Earl of Winchester, who in turn granted it to John de Hadlow, lord of nearby Boarstall in Buckinghamshire. In 1326 Despenser was executed for rebelling against Edward II and forfeited his estates, but de Hadlow was allowed to keep Piddington until he died in 1346. However, Sybil, widow of Alan Plukenet, successfully claimed a third of Piddington as dower. Also, in 1331 St Frideswide's Priory began a lawsuit to recover Piddington from John de Hadlow.

In 1337 Edward III granted Piddington to Nicholas de la Beche of Aldworth and in 1340 de la Beche was licensed to grant Piddington to Sir John Sutton, lord of Dudley. In 1347 Sir John was licensed to grant Piddington to John de Peyto for life, with reversion to Sir John thereafter. Title was then disputed between the Sutton and de Peyto families, but in 1359 the Priory finally succeeded in regaining the manor. St Frideswide's Priory retained Piddington until 1525, when Cardinal Wolsey suppressed the Priory to found his Cardinal's College. In 1530 Henry VIII deposed Wolsey and in 1532 Piddington passed to Christ Church, Oxford.

However, in 1553 Piddington was granted to Thomas Dynham, lord of the manors of Brill and Boarstall in Buckinghamshire. In 1634 Thomas's grandson John Dynham died leaving his estates to his daughters Mary and Alice. Piddington seems to have passed to Mary, as her daughter Margaret Lewis was lady of the manor in 1661. Her daughter Mary Jephson inherited Piddington in 1672 and had married Sir John Aubrey, 2nd Baronet by 1691. On her death in 1717 Mary's stepson Sir John Aubrey, 3rd Baronet inherited Piddington, and it remained with the Aubrey baronets until Sir Thomas Digby Aubrey, 7th Baronet died in 1856 and the title became extinct.

A cousin of Sir Thomas, Elizabeth Sophia Ricketts, inherited Piddington. Her son Charles Aubrey Ricketts inherited the manor and took the name Charles Aubrey Aubrey. He died in 1901, leaving Piddington to Sir Henry Aubrey-Fletcher, 4th Baronet, who was the great-grandson of Sir John Aubrey, 3rd Baronet. Sir Henry Aubrey-Fletcher, 6th Baronet, also known as the detective novelist Henry Wade, inherited the manor in 1937 and still held it in the 1950s.

== Church and chapel ==
=== Church of England ===
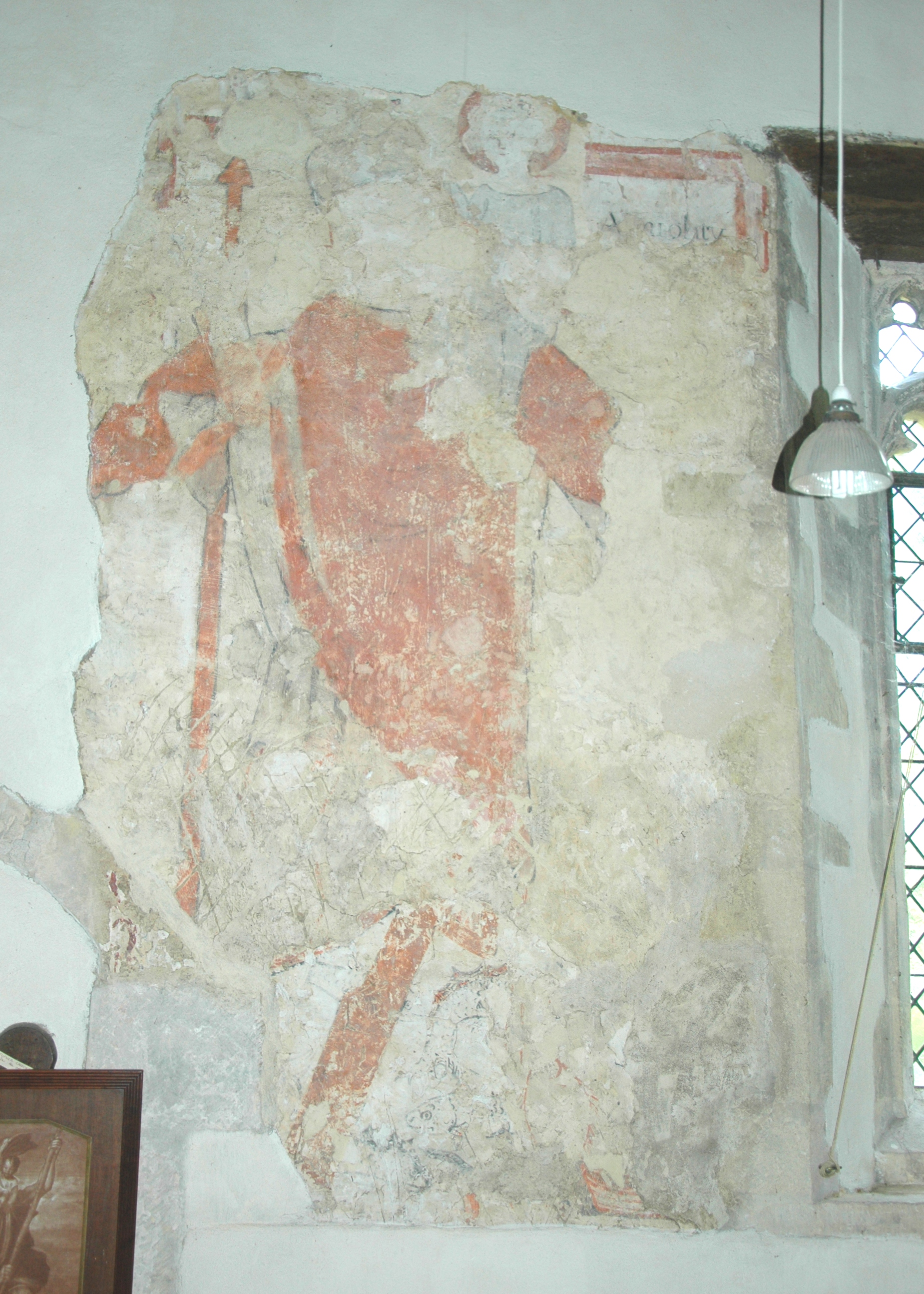
14th-century mural of Saint Christopher carrying Jesus Christ across a river

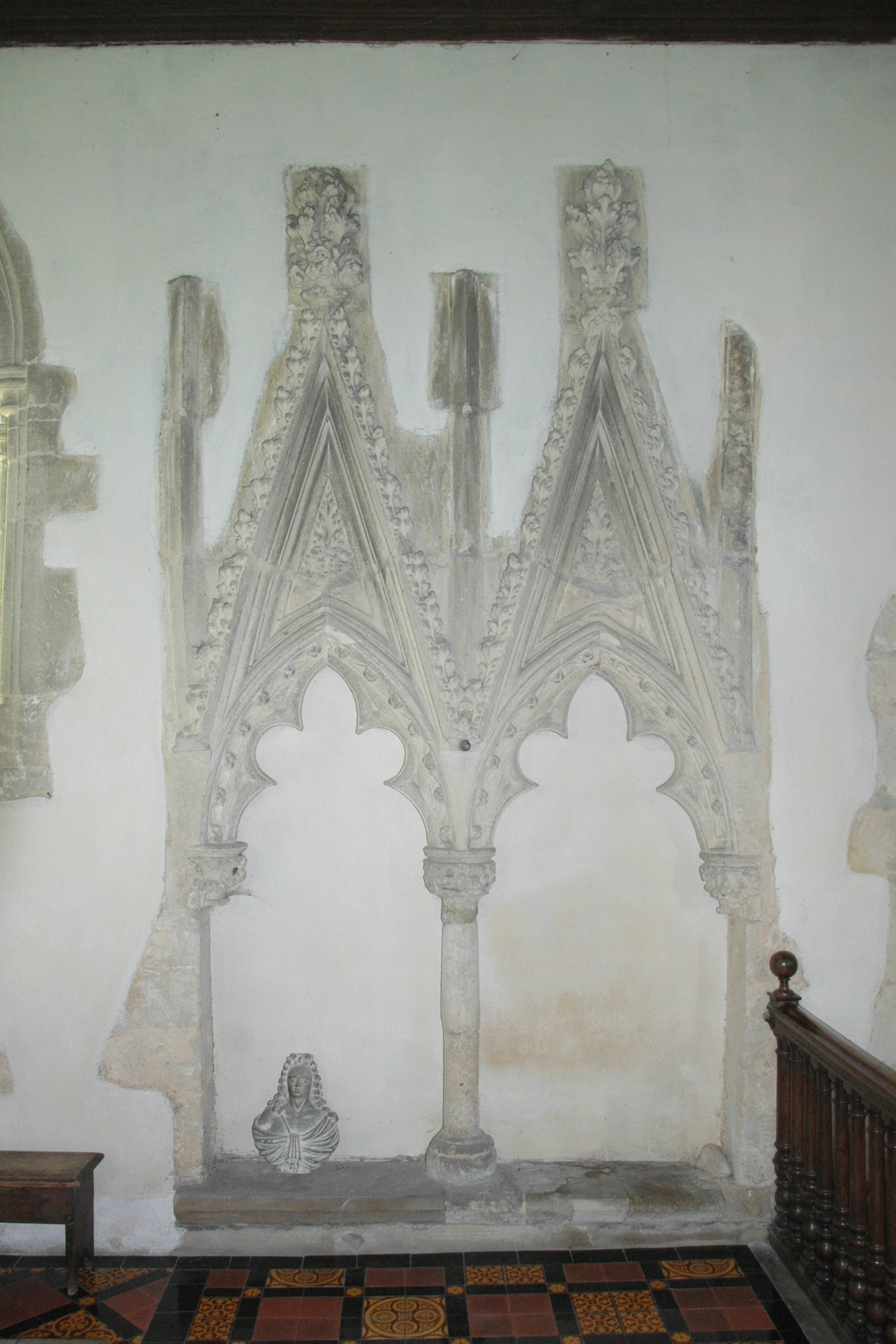
Decorated Gothic sedilia in the chancel of St Nicholas' church

Piddington was originally part of the ecclesiastical parish of Ambrosden. By 1152 "Ralph the hermit" had established Holy Cross chapel on Muswell Hill about 1 mile (1.6 km) south of the village. Until the English Reformation, Piddington villagers used to process to the chapel on Christian feast days. The last ruins of the chapel are reported to have disappeared in 1800.

The chapel of Saint Nicholas in Piddington is known to have existed by 1309. It is now Piddington's Church of England parish church. Its Early English chancel was built in about 1300, but has ornate Decorated Gothic sedilia and Easter Sepulchre carved in about 1350. There is a canonical sundial on the south wall. In the 14th century the Decorated Gothic south aisle was added, with a four-bay arcade and some new two-light windows, but also re-using two Early English lancet windows presumably from the south wall of the nave.

A number of Perpendicular Gothic windows were later added to the nave and one to the north wall of the chancel. The present belltower was built in the 16th century. St. Nicholas' parish church was repaired in 1826 and restored in 1855. In 1898 it was restored again under the architect John Oldrid Scott, whose alterations included replacing the chancel arch. A 14th-century mural, of Saint Christopher carrying Jesus Christ across a river, was discovered on the north wall of the nave in 1896 and was restored in 1935.

The west tower has a ring of five bells. Edward Hemins of Bicester cast the tenor bell in 1729 and the fourth bell in 1738. Llewellins and James of Bristol cast the treble, second and third bells in 1887, the year of Queen Victoria's Golden Jubilee.

Since December 1966 the church has been designated a Grade II* listed building. St Nicholas' parish is part of the Benefice of the Ray Valley, along with the parishes of Ambrosden, Charlton-on-Otmoor, Islip, Merton, Murcott, Noke, Oddington and Woodeaton.

=== Congregational chapel ===
The Congregational chapel in the village was founded in 1825 and enlarged at a later date. It was still used for worship in 1951 but has since been converted into a private house.

== Social and economic history ==
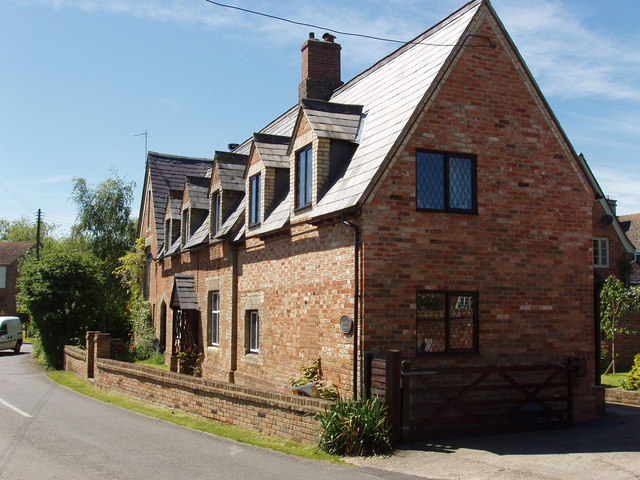
Piddington's former National School, built in 1863 and now a private home

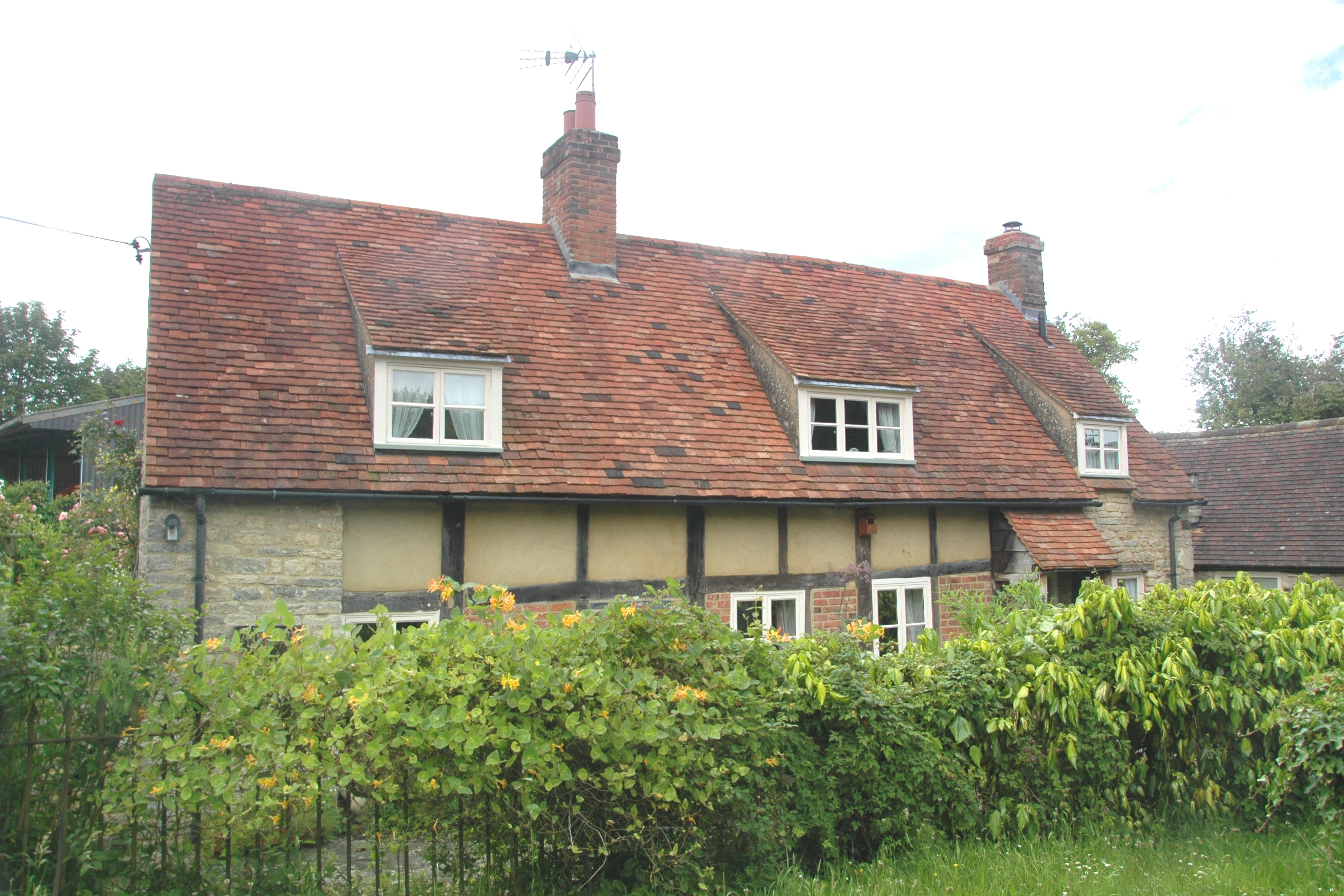
Church Cottage in Thame Road is a timber-framed cottage that dates mostly from the 17th century.

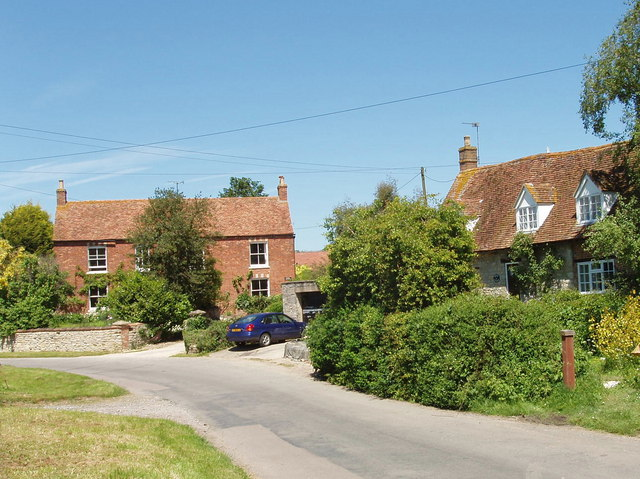
Cottages in Thame Road, Piddington

A Sunday school in Piddington was founded in 1818. It became a day school. supported by the National Society for Promoting Religious Education, in 1858, and a new school building was erected in 1863. In 1925 it was reorganised as a junior and infants' school. It was still open in 1952 but has since closed.

In about 1910, the Great Western Railway built a new main line linking Ashendon Junction and King's Sutton to complete a new high-speed route between London Paddington and Birmingham Snow Hill. The line passes within a few hundred metres of Piddington. The GWR opened a station called Brill and Ludgershall just over 1 mile (1.6 km) east of Piddington. British Railways closed the station in 1953 but the railway remains open as part of the Chiltern Main Line.

In 1941, the Bicester Military Railway was built. It connects with the Varsity Line just west of Bicester, runs through the villages of Ambrosden and Arncott and terminates at Piddington, serving various military depots en route. It remains in use today.

In August 2026 the average price paid for properties in Piddington was £751,000, a rise of 12.0% over the previous 12 months.

=== John Drinkwater ===
John Drinkwater (1 June 1882– 25 March 1937) who became one of the Dymock poets and a playwright working with the Birmingham Repertory Theatre, is buried in St Nicholas' churchyard. He often visited relatives in Piddington and mentioned Piddington in several poems, including "A New Ballard of Charity" (1922):

...the primroses of Bagley Wood,
old apple trees at Piddington.

and "The Patriot" (1919):

... fields below the rookery
that comfortably looks upon
the little street of Piddington.

His gravestone is engraved with words from his "Amaranth":

In some new brain the sleeping dust will waken
Courage and love that conquered and were done
Called from a night by thought of man forsaken
Will know again the gladness of the sun.

=== Flora Thompson ===
John Drinkwater was related to Flora Thompson through their ancestors: Drinkwater's great-great-grandfather and Flora's great-great-grandmother were siblings. Flora Thompson's (née Timms) ancestors the Shaws and the Wallingtons, yeoman farmers, lived in Piddington and are buried outside the porch of the church. Although now very weathered, the oldest gravestone is of John Shaw (1691–1767). Other family graves include one of Elizabeth Shaw née Beck (1762–1791), Flora's great-great-grandmother whose elder brother was Thomas Beck (1756–1838) John Drinkwater's great-great-grandfather.

Flora Thompson's paternal grandmother Martha Wallington (1816–1888) was born in the old farmhouse now a private house at the junction with Widnell Lane. Martha was orphaned at an early age when her mother and three of her siblings died in 1824, followed the next year by the death of her father. Their deaths were probably attributed to infected water from the farmhouse well. Martha was eight, and her orphaned siblings (Edward 17 years, Elizabeth 13 years, Leonard 12 years, and Clementine the youngest at three year) appeared to have raised themselves after uncles could not help them due to their own 'indifferent circumstances'. Martha Wallington married Flora's paternal grandfather Thomas Timms, whose son Albert Timms married Emma Dibber, Flora's mother.

== Amenities ==
The Seven Stars

The Seven Stars pub closed in 2012, and was converted to residential use in 2023. From 2002 to 2005 it had operated as the Sunset and Stars restaurant, and in 2007 and 2008 it was Cootz wine bar.

Piddington has a village hall, which hosts many regular events. It serves as the local voting centre.

== Independence referendum ==
On 4 July 2026, 96% of residents of Piddington voted in favour of holding a referendum on whether to secede from the United Kingdom, following notification that 1,250 asylum seekers, specifically only single men aged 18 to 65, were going to be relocated to a nearby former Ministry of Defence site, part of MOD Bicester. The government made an Urgent Crown Development application on 2 September, to fast-track the plans. The military base had previously accommodated around 2,600 personnel comprising 1,100 service personnel, men and women aged 18 to 65, alongside roughly 1,500 civilian workers. The referendum was held on 15 September; of the 312 votes cast, 285 were in favour of secession, 26 were against, and there was one spoiled ballot. The vote has no official status and therefore is not legally binding and was intended as a protest. After the vote, a sign with the village’s unofficial new name, "Principality of Piddington", was displayed.

Local Liberal Democrat MP Calum Miller opposes the plans for housing asylum seekers at the base.

In November 2026, planning permission for the base's conversion was granted by the Housing Secretary Angela Rayner. In an interview with BBC News, Parish Council chair Tim McNally responded to the decision by announcing that the village will be launching a legal challenge against it.

== Sources ==
- Lobel, Mary D, ed. (1957). A History of the County of Oxford. Victoria County History. Vol. 5: Bullingdon Hundred. London: Oxford University Press for the Institute of Historical Research. pp. 249–258.
- Sherwood, Jennifer; Pevsner, Nikolaus (1974). Oxfordshire. The Buildings of England. Harmondsworth: Penguin. p. 731. ISBN 0-14-071045-0.
