= Merton, Oxfordshire =

Village in Oxfordshire, England

Coordinates: 51.855°N 1.164°W

Merton
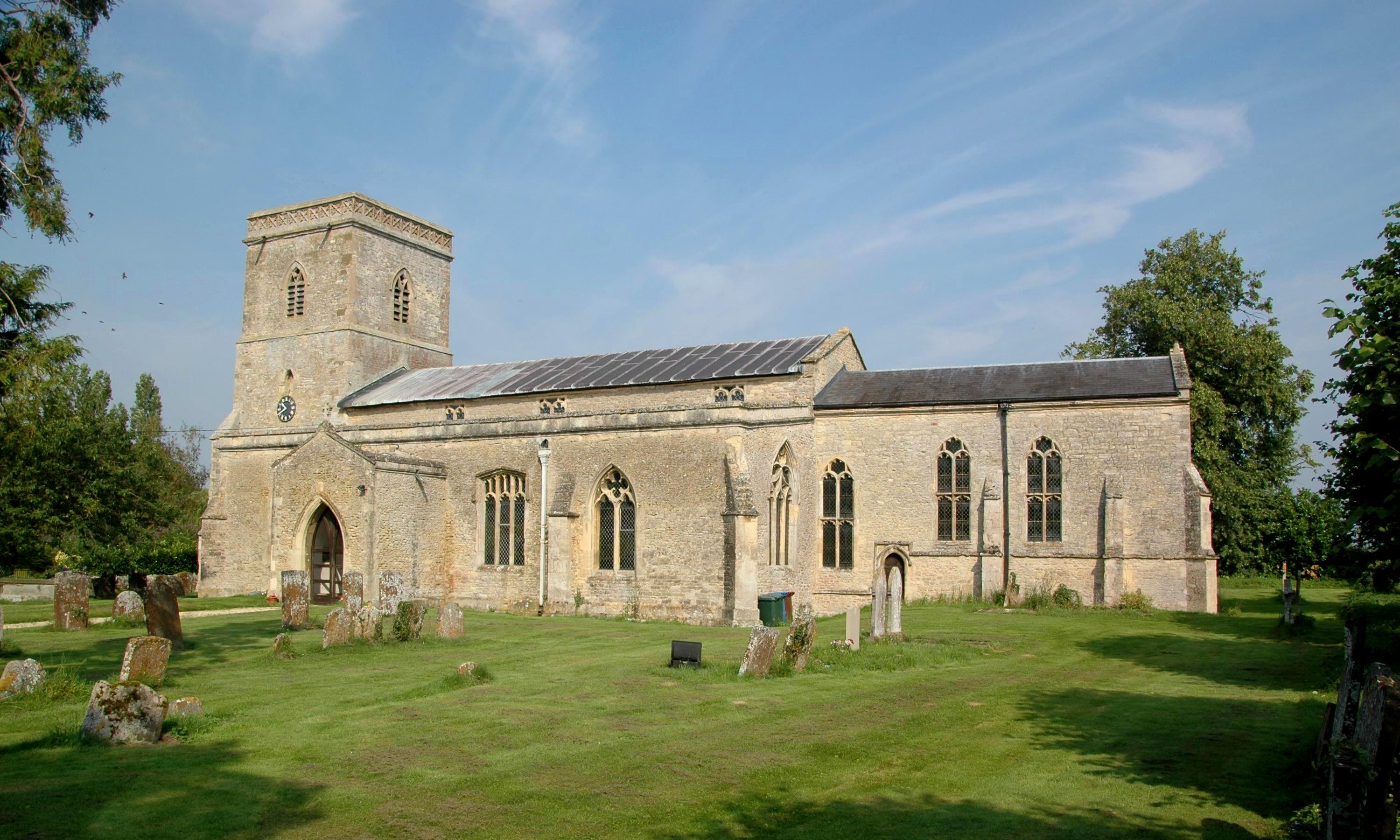
- St Swithun's parish church

- Location within Oxfordshire
- Area: 7.07 km^{2} (2.73 sq mi)
- Population: 424 (2011 census)
  - Density: 60/km^{2} (160/sq mi)
- OS grid reference: SP5615
- Civil parish: Merton
- District: Cherwell
- Shire county: Oxfordshire
- Region: South East
- Country: England
- Sovereign state: United Kingdom
- Post town: Bicester
- Postcode district: OX25
- Dialling code: 01865
- Police: Thames Valley
- Fire: Oxfordshire
- Ambulance: South Central
- UK Parliament: Bicester and Woodstock
- Website: Merton Parish Council

Merton is a village and civil parish near the River Ray, about 4 miles (6.4 km) south of Bicester in Oxfordshire, England. The 2011 census recorded the parish's population as 424.

== Archaeology ==
In 1978 a Middle Bronze Age spearhead was found at West End Farm on the northwestern side of the village.

== Manor ==
Just before the Norman Conquest of England Hacun, a Dane, held the manor of Meretone and also the nearby manor of Piddington. The toponym is derived from the Old English for a tun, hamlet or settlement by the mere.

The Domesday Book records that by 1086 Countess Judith of Lens, a niece of William the Conqueror, held the manor. Countess Judith was betrothed to Simon I de Senlis but refused to marry him and fled England. William confiscated her estates and allowed Simon to marry Judith's eldest daughter Maud. Simon received estates including Merton as the honour of Huntingdon.

In 1152 or 1153 Simon's son Simon II de Senlis, Earl of Huntingdon-Northampton gave Merton to the Knights Templar. In 1185 the manor covered seven hides, making it their largest estate in Oxfordshire. In 1312 Pope Clement V ordered the Templars' dissolution and their English estates were confiscated by Edward II, who granted Merton to the Knights Hospitaller in 1313. In 1540 the Hospitallers were suppressed in the dissolution of the monasteries and surrendered Merton to the Crown, which left it in the possession of the Templars' tenant, William Mablyston of Ludgershall, Buckinghamshire.

=== Harington baronets ===
In 1554 the Mablystons' lease expired and Robert Doyley of Chiselhampton and his son John acquired the manor. John died in 1593 and his widow Anne married Sir James Harington in 1601. In 1640 Sir James Harington, 3rd Baronet married Katherine, daughter of Sir Edmund Wright, Lord Mayor of London. Sir James was a Member of Parliament from 1646 until 1655 and during the English Civil War he served as a major-general in the Parliamentarian army. After the English Restoration his baronetcy was forfeited for life in 1661 under the Indemnity and Oblivion Act. Sir James fled to the European mainland and died in exile.

Sir James' father-in-law had remained a Royalist throughout the Civil War and Commonwealth, which helped Lady Katherine to claim she did not share her husband's politics. In 1662 the Crown granted letters patent placing the estate in trust, and upon Lady Katherine's death in 1675 it passed to her and Sir James' eldest son Sir Edmund Harington, 4th Baronet. The Harington baronets owned Merton until Sir James Harington, 6th Baronet ran up large sporting debts and in 1740 mortgaged Merton to Sir Edward Turner, 2nd Baronet of the neighbouring parish of Ambrosden. Sir James was a Jacobite who supported the Stuart claim to the United Kingdom. In 1747, he joined Charles Edward Stuart in exile and in 1749 Sir Edward Turner (later Page-Turner) obtained Merton by foreclosing the mortgage. The Page-Turner baronets (later Dryden baronets) retained Merton until 1930.

=== Manor house ===
The Doyleys built the manor house in the latter part of the 16th century. It is thought to have been L-shaped, but after Sir Edward Page-Turner bought the manor in 1749 he had the south wing demolished and the surviving wing turned into a farmhouse. In 1838 the house's oak panelling was sold. In 1860 the house was modernised and its Elizabethan porch, gables, stone roof and mullioned windows were all removed. The house now has sash windows. The original kitchen and stone-arched cellar survive, and the cellar includes a well. A dairy wing was added late in the 19th century. The house's 17th century square, two-storeyed dovecote also survives. The house is now a nursing home.

== Church and chapel ==
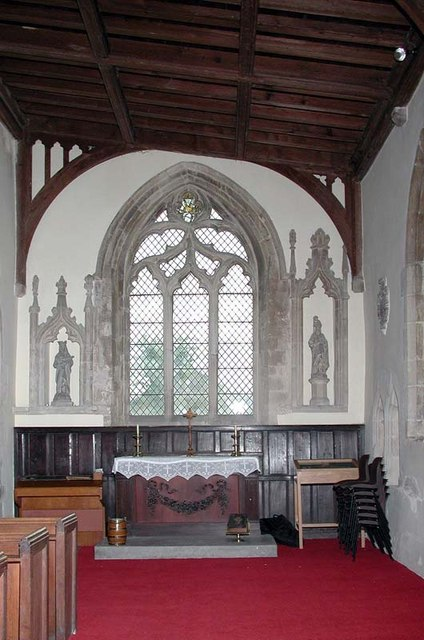
St Swithun's parish church: chapel in the south aisle, with 14th century Decorated Gothic east window

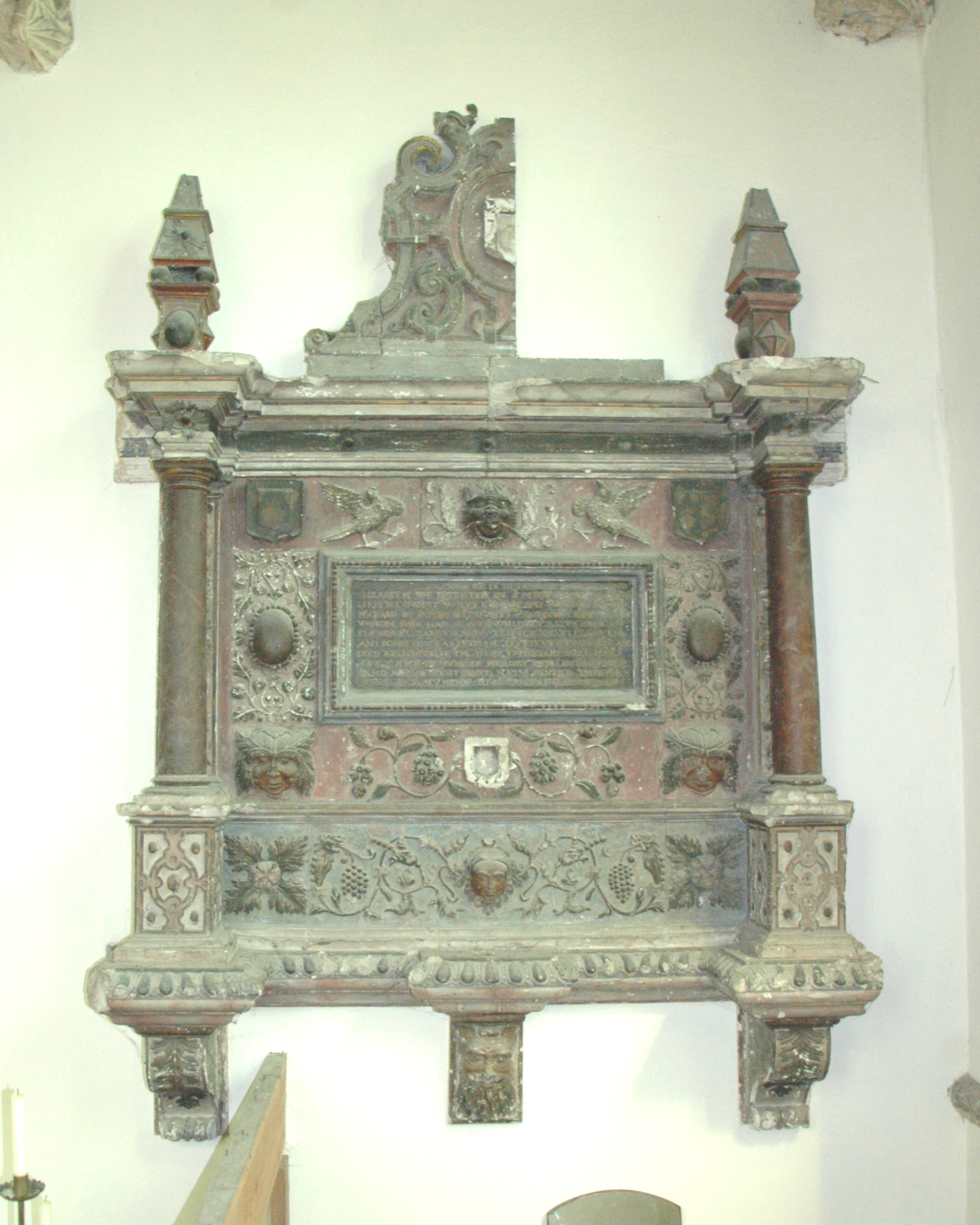
St Swithun's parish church: monument to Elizabeth Poole (died 1621), now mutilated and neglected

The Church of England parish church of Saint Swithun is Decorated Gothic, built early in the 14th century. It has a south aisle, linked with the nave by an arcade of four bays. Late in the 15th century the Perpendicular Gothic clerestory was added to the nave. The chancel windows and one window in the south aisle are also Perpendicular Gothic. The font is much older than the church, dating from late in the 12th century.

St Swithun's had a north aisle but it was demolished in the 15th or 16th century. Its arcade of three bays was blocked up and remains in the north wall of the nave. The tower had a spire but it became unsafe and in 1796 it was removed. St Swithun's most notable monuments are wall-mounted ones in the chancel commemorating John Doyley (died 1593) and his wife, Elizabeth Poole (died 1621) and Richard Harrington (died 1712). The Poole monument has strapwork and Tuscan columns but is significantly mutilated and in want of restoration.

A turret clock for St Swithun's was made late in the 17th century. Its original dial had only an hour hand. In 1867 this was replaced with a new dial that has both hour and minute hands. Some time after 1989 a new turret clock was installed; the 17th century original is now displayed in the nave.

The Gothic Revival architect Charles Buckeridge restored St Swithun's from 1865 until 1872. St Swithun's had been decorated with medieval wall paintings, once brightly coloured but by 1823 described as "dim with age". During the restoration work it was found impossible to remove the layers of whitewash covering them. St Swithun's is a Grade I listed building.

In the Edwardine Inventory of 1552 St Swithun's had three bells and a Sanctus bell. In 1795 the bell tower had a ring of seven bells but the churchwardens obtained permission to sell five of them to pay for a new lead roof for the church. By the 1950s there were only two bells: one cast by Richard Keene of Woodstock in 1694 and the other cast in 1887.

In 1565 the Crown sold the advowson and rectory to William Petre, who in 1572 gave both to Exeter College, Oxford. Since 2000 the ecclesiastical parish of Merton has been part of the Ray Valley Benefice. A Congregational chapel was built in 1890. It was still in use for worship in 1953.

== Economic and social history ==
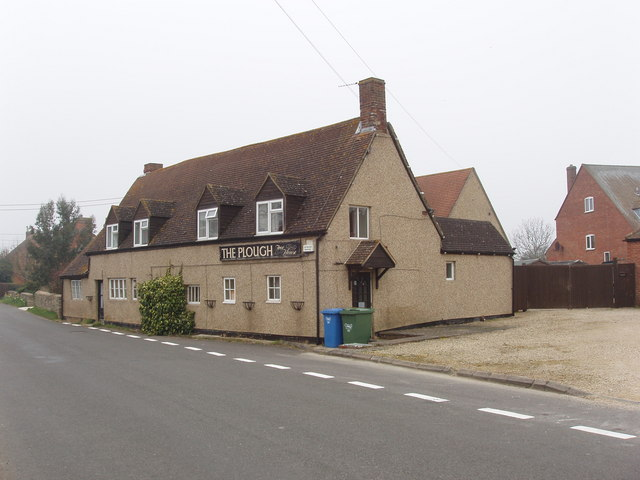
The Plough public house, which has ceased trading

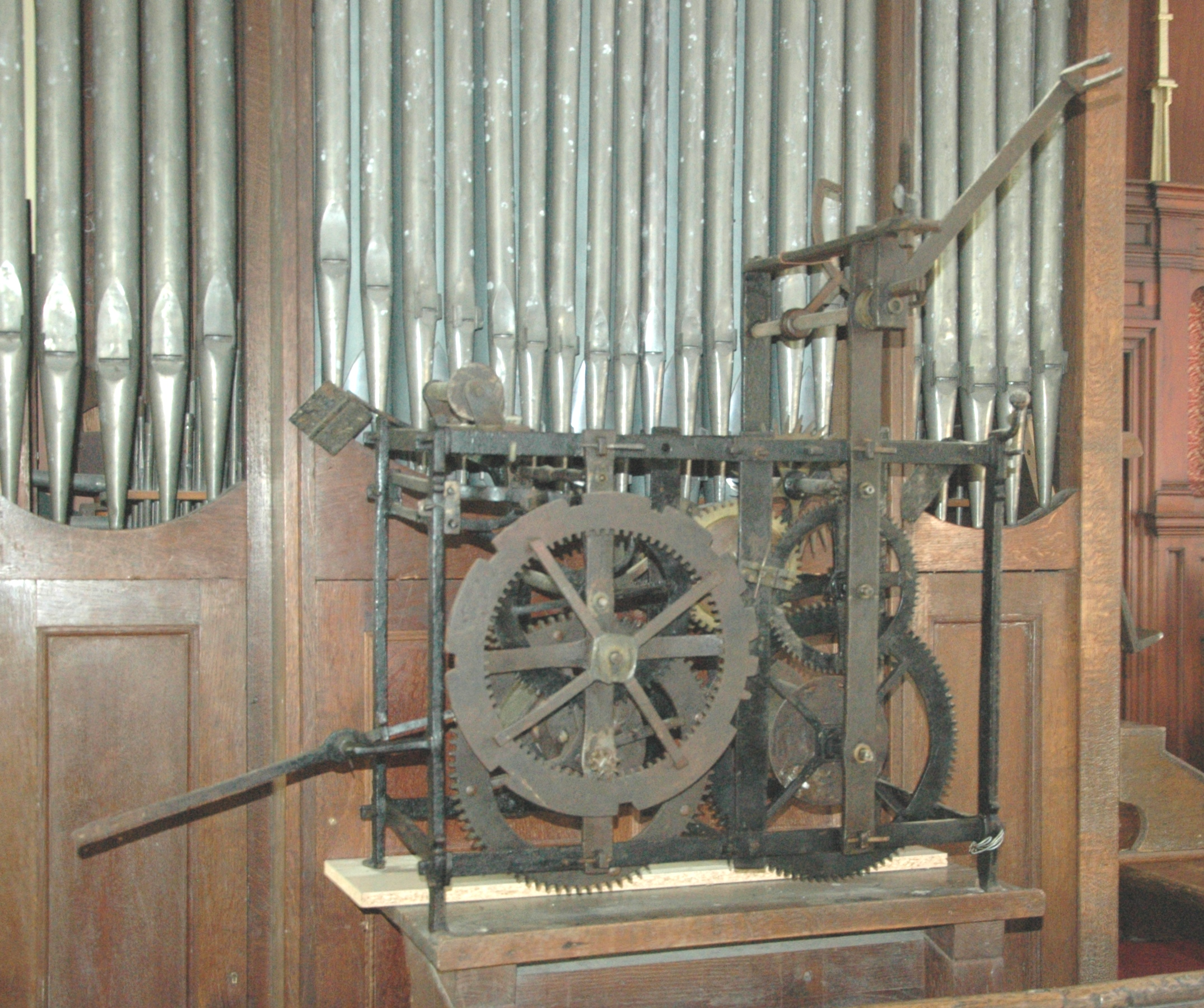
St Swithun's parish church: late 17th-century turret clock, now displayed in the nave

The Knights Templar established a watermill in the parish. The earliest known record of it is from 1156 to 66. West of St Swithun's is a rubblestone tithe barn that may have been built in the 15th century or early 16th century. It has a queen post roof and is thatched. In the late 20th century it was converted into four homes.

Merton Inclosure Act 1763
- Act of Parliament
- Parliament of Great Britain
- Long title: An Act for dividing and enclosing the Open and Common Fields in the Township of Merton, in the County of Oxford; and for making a Compensation for Common of Pasture and Tithes arising therein.
- Citation: 3 Geo. 3. c. 34 Pr.
- Territorial extent: Great Britain

Dates
- Royal assent: 12 April 1763
- Commencement: 25 November 1762 (Note: Start of session)

Status: Current legislation

There were small enclosures of land in the parish in the 14th and 16th centuries but an open field system of farming prevailed until 1763. In the 1761 Parliamentary election Sir Edward Turner entered the House of Commons as Member of Parliament for Penryn in Cornwall. Sir Edward got Parliament to pass an inclosure act for the parish of Merton, the Merton Inclosure Act 1763 (3 Geo. 3. c. 34 Pr.). This extinguished all common land rights in Merton and assigned most of the land to Sir Edward.

In 1814 one of the earliest National Schools to be established under the auspices of the National Society for Promoting Religious Education was opened in Merton. A new stone-built school building, complete with lodging for the matron, was completed in 1829. Ownership and management of the school were transferred to the vicar and churchwardens in 1870. The school was enlarged in 1872 and 1893. The number of pupils then declined and in 1913 the school was closed and 12 pupils were transferred to Ambrosden. In 1930 the house and school were sold and became a private home.

Merton used to have a public house, the Plough Inn, whose building is partly Tudor. In the 2000s the owners closed the pub, and in the 2010s it was converted into housing. Since the Plough's closure the village has held real ale festivals at least once a year in its village hall.

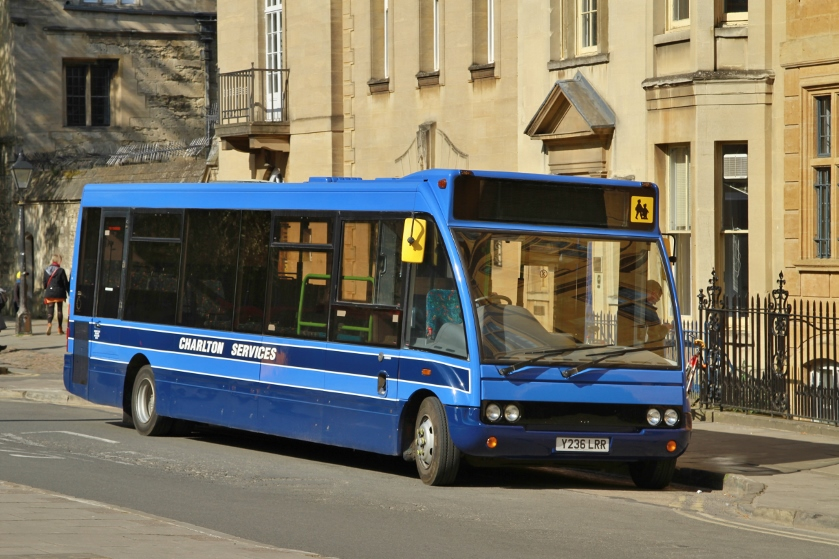
Charlton Services bus on route 94 at its terminus outside Balliol College, Oxford

== Buses ==
Charlton-on-Otmoor Services bus route 94 used to link Merton with Oxford via Gosford. Stagecoach in Oxfordshire route H5 links Merton with the John Radcliffe Hospital via Islip and Barton, and with Bicester via Ambrosden. Buses run hourly from Monday to Saturday. Merton has no bus service on Sunday or on public holidays.

== Bibliography ==
- Arkell, WJ (1942). "Place-Names and Topography in the Upper Thames Country: a regional essay" (PDF). Oxoniensia. VII. Oxford Architectural and Historical Society: 1–23.
- Beeson, CFC (1989) [1962]. Simcock, AV (ed.). Clockmaking in Oxfordshire 1400–1850 (3rd ed.). Oxford: Museum of the History of Science. p. 46. ISBN 0-903364-06-9.
- Lobel, Mary D, ed. (1957). A History of the County of Oxford. Victoria County History. Vol. 5: Bullingdon Hundred. London: Oxford University Press for the Institute of Historical Research. pp. 221–234.
- Sherwood, Jennifer; Pevsner, Nikolaus (1974). Oxfordshire. The Buildings of England. Harmondsworth: Penguin Books. pp. 700–701. ISBN 0-14-071045-0.
