= Portrait of Sir Edward Turner =

1762 painting by Thomas Gainsborough

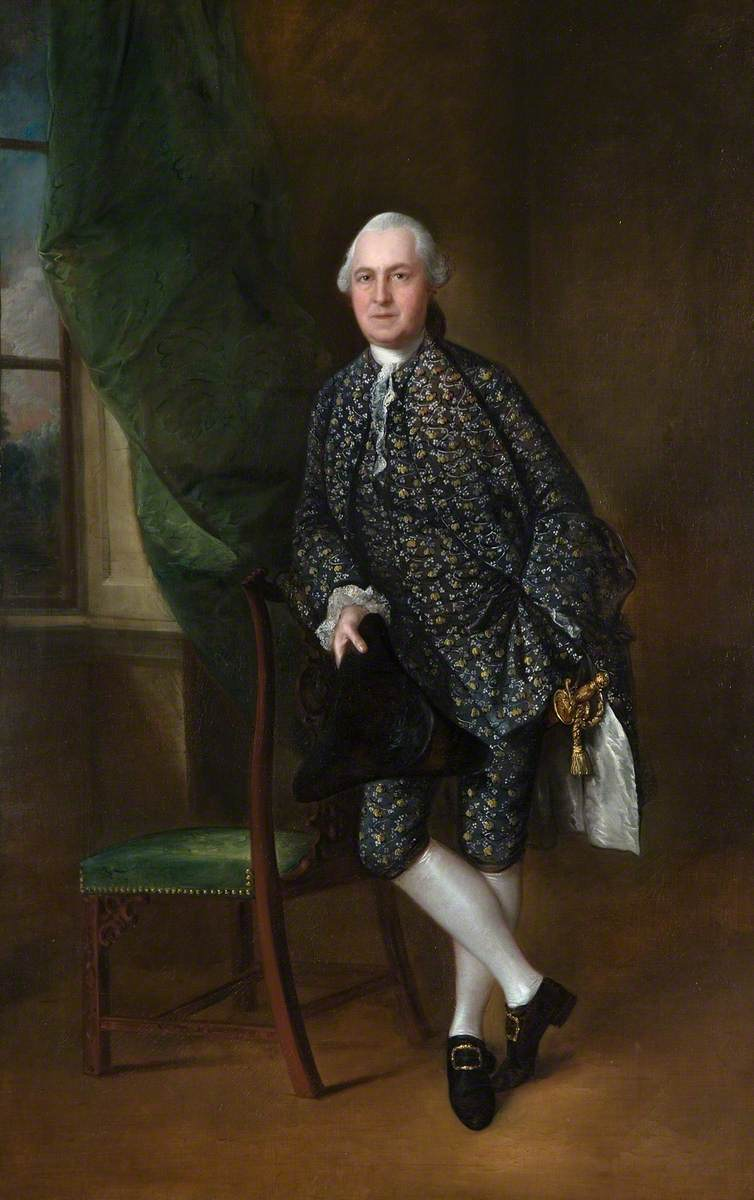
- Artist: Thomas Gainsborough
- Year: 1762
- Type: Oil on canvas, portrait painting
- Dimensions: 229 cm × 147.5 cm (90 in × 58.1 in)
- Location: Wolverhampton Art Gallery; Wolverhampton

Portrait of Sir Edward Turner is a 1762 portrait painting by the British artist Thomas Gainsborough. It depicts the English landowner and Whig politician Sir Edward Turner, 2nd Baronet. Turner is shown at full-length in a brocade suit. It was produced while the Suffolk-born Gainsborough was based in the spa city of Bath, having recently moved there from Ipswich.

Today the painting is in the collection of the Wolverhampton Art Gallery in the West Midlands having been acquired in 1981.

== Bibliography ==
- Jones, Rice. Thomas Gainsborough. Harry N. Abrams, 2002.
- Lambert, Miles & Cole, Shaun. Dandy Style: 250 Years of British Men's Fashion. Yale University Press, 2021.
