= Ambrosden =

Village in Oxfordshire, England

Coordinates: 51.876°N 1.119°W

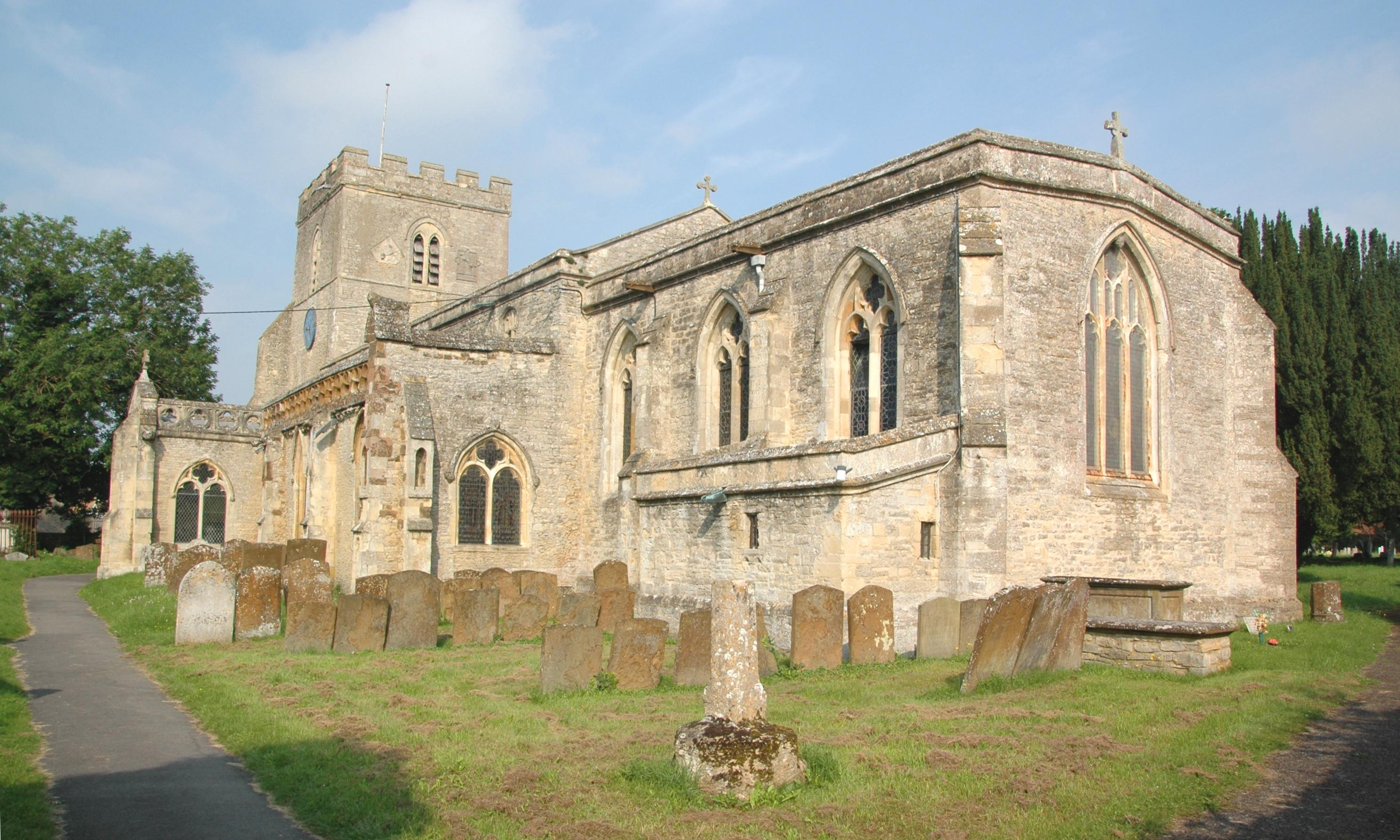
- St Mary the Virgin parish church

- Location within Oxfordshire
- Area: 7.26 km^{2} (2.80 sq mi)
- Population: 2,248 (2011 Census)
  - Density: 310/km^{2} (800/sq mi)
- OS grid reference: SP5822
- Civil parish: Ambrosden
- District: Cherwell
- Shire county: Oxfordshire
- Region: South East
- Country: England
- Sovereign state: United Kingdom
- Post town: Bicester
- Postcode district: OX25
- Dialling code: 01869
- Police: Thames Valley
- Fire: Oxfordshire
- Ambulance: South Central
- UK Parliament: Bicester and Woodstock
- Website: Ambrosden Parish Council

Ambrosden is a village and civil parish in Cherwell, Oxfordshire, England, 3 miles (5 km) southwest of Bicester to which it is linked by the A41 road, and 13 miles (21 km) from Oxford. The 2011 Census recorded the parish's population as 2,248. The parish is bounded by the River Ray to the south, its tributary the River Bure to the west, the outskirts of Bicester to the north and field boundaries to the east.

The village is 2 miles (3 km) east of Alchester Roman Town. Ambrosden has a Church of England parish church and a public house. Since the Second World War Ambrosden has housed British Army personnel stationed at St. George's Barracks, which is at Arncott about 1 1/2 miles (2.4 km) south of Ambrosden. The Ministry of Defence had many new houses built at Ambrosden in the early 1950s.

== Geography ==
Ambrosden is about 3 miles (5 km) southeast of Bicester (the nearest railway station), connected by the A41 road. The site of Alchester Roman town is about 2 miles (3 km) west of the village, and the village of Arncott is about 1 1/2 miles (2.4 km) to the south.

In 1932 Langford, Wretchwick, and Middle Wretchwick Farms, which were formerly part of the Bicester Market End township, were added to Ambrosden. The townships of Blackthorn and Arncott were part of Arncott but in the 20th century were detached to form separate parishes. The present Ambrosden parish is about 2 miles (3 km) wide both north–south and east–west.

Three bridges cross the River Ray in the parish: Heath Bridge and Arncott Bridge, and Blackthorn Bridge. Arncott Bridge is on the road between Arncott and Ambrosden and is a five-arched bridge built in the 18th century. The land is relatively level, about 200 feet (61 m) above sea level, apart from Graven Hill north-west of the village, which is 372 feet (113 m) high.

== Toponym ==
In the 19th century it was believed that the toponym "Ambrosden" came from a diminutive derivative of the name Ambrosius Aurelianus, a 5th-century British commander of Roman descent, and that the commander had encamped close the present site of Ambrosden to help the neighbouring military garrison at Alchester in conflicts with the Anglo-Saxons. The word don or den, an Old English word meaning "a place on a hill or ascent", was added as a suffix. Thus, a Roman name and an English syllable may have been combined as "Ambrosden".

This interpretation, however, has been rejected by historians who believe the toponym was derived not from Ambrosius, but from the Old English for "Ambre's hill". This seems unlikely however, as 'ambre' means bucket in old English. The forms Ambresdone, Ambresden, or Aumbresden were all recorded in the Middle Ages.

== Archaeology ==
The course of Akeman Street Roman road, which linked Watling Street with the Fosse Way, passes through the parish less than 1/2 mile (800 m) north of the village. Roman pottery has been found in the area. When the scholar and antiquarian White Kennett was Vicar of Ambrosden (from 1685 to 1708), ancient Danish remains were found in the parish.

== Manor ==
During the reign of King Edward the Confessor a lady called Elviva (probably a Latin rendering of the Old English name Ælfgifu), held the manor of Ambrosden. The Domesday Book of 1086 records that by that date she had been replaced by Hugh d'Ivry, butler of William the Conqueror and brother of Roger d'Ivry, who owned several manors in Oxfordshire. Hugh's nephew Roger II d'Ivry inherited Ambrosden and by 1194 it was part of the Honour of St. Valery. Ambrosden thus passed to Edmund, 2nd Earl of Cornwall, who in 1288 gave the manor to Ashridge Priory of the Augustinian order of the Brothers of Penitence. Ashridge Priory retained Ambrosden until the priory was dissolved in 1539 in the Dissolution of the Monasteries.

In 1542, the Crown granted Ambrosden to John Denton of Blackthorn, Oxfordshire who was lord of the manor of one of the manors of Bicester. Ambrosden remained in the hands of the Denton family until 1604, when Edward Denton and his son-in-law Edward Smyth of Stoke Prior, Worcestershire sold the manor to Margaret Whethill of London. Margaret married Sir Thomas Mildmay of Chelmsford, whose family were recusants. Their grandson Francis Mildmay was a Royalist in the English Civil War, so in 1648 Parliament sequestered his estates. During the Commonwealth of England, the Treason Trustees twice sold Ambrosden to wealthy Londoners: to John Warre in 1653 and to William Drax and Alexander Jackson in 1657. Francis Mildmay recovered Ambrosden but in 1658 mortgaged it to Sir James Drax, also of London and in 1660 sold 100 acres (40 hectares) of the estate to various yeoman farmers.

In 1673, Francis Mildmay's widow Mary and son, Walter Mildmay, sold the remainder of the manor to Sir William Glynne, 1st Baronet, of Bicester. Sir William rebuilt the manor house shortly afterwards. Ambrosden remained with the Glynne family until Sir Stephen Glynne, 3rd Baronet sold it in 1729. During the English Civil War, the area was occupied in June 1643, when part of the King's forces were at Bicester and guarded Blackthorn Bridge.

=== Page-Turner baronets ===
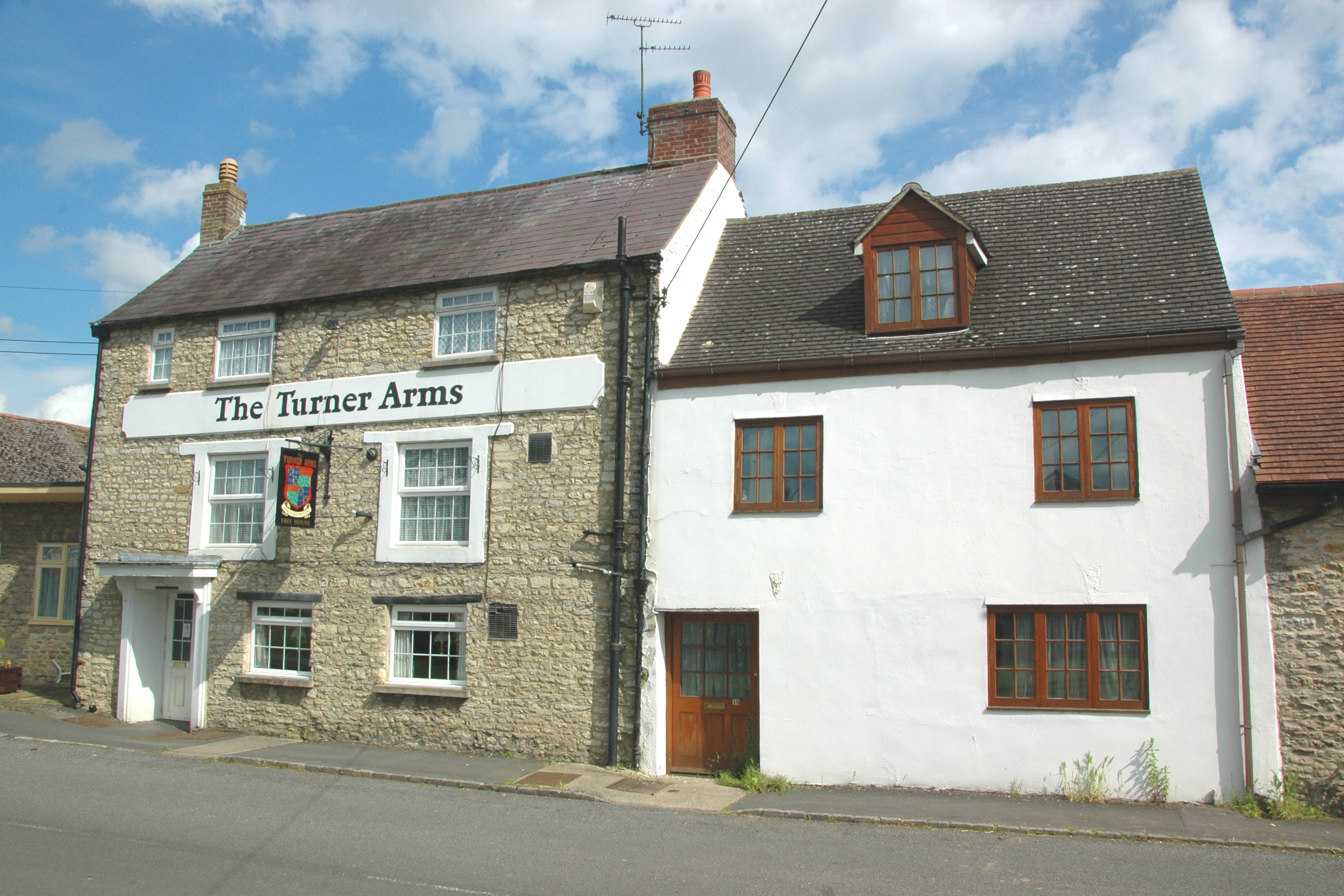
The Turner Arms in Merton Road is named after the baronets

In 1729 the manor was bought by Edward Turner, who had already bought one of the manors of Bicester from Sir Stephen in 1728. In 1733, Turner was made the first of the Turner and Page-Turner baronets of Ambrosden. In around 1740, Sir Edward Turner, 2nd Baronet replaced the Glynnes' manor house with a large square house of eleven bays. In its construction, the house reused stone from the manor house, mixed with local limestone from the Stone Pitts quarry at Blackthorn, Oxfordshire and Cotswold stone from Bibury in Gloucestershire. The architect was Sanderson Miller, who also designed ornamental buildings in the grounds.

A landscaped park with lakes and statues was laid out around the house, and the drive to the house was along a semicircular avenue of trees. Sir Edward died in 1766. Sir Gregory Page-Turner, 3rd Baronet considered the house too large, so in 1767 he sought to demolish part of it to create a smaller house. This proved impossible so in 1768 he had the entire house demolished.

Ambrosden remained with the Turner (later Page-Turner) baronets until 1874 when Sir Edward Henry Page-Turner, 6th Baronet died childless. The 6th Baronet left all his estates to his nephew, Frederick Augustus Blaydes. The Blaydes took the Page-Turner name and coat of arms in 1903, but sold the estate in 1930.

== Parish church ==
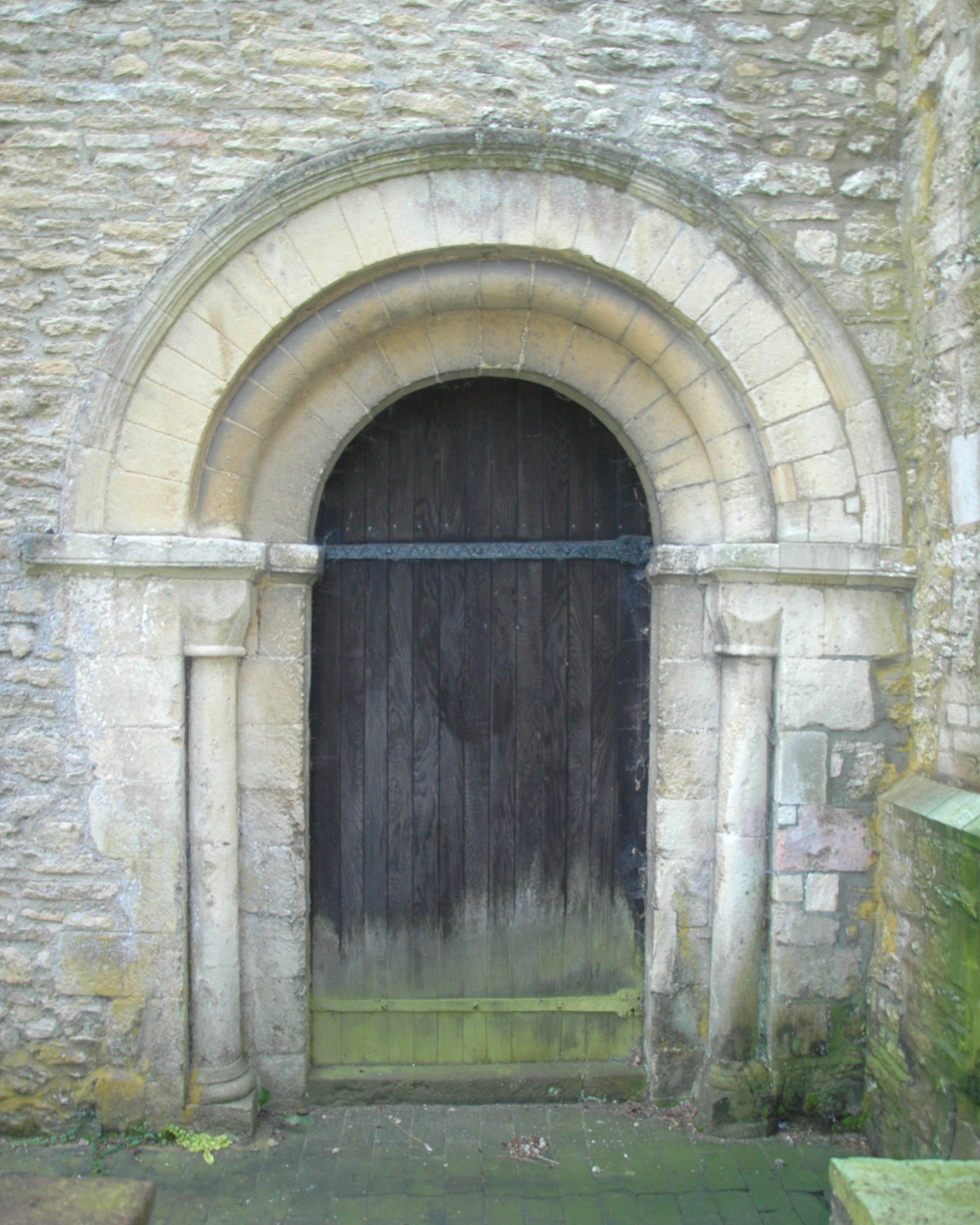
St Mary the Virgin parish church: 12th-century Norman north doorway

The earliest part of the Church of England parish church of St Mary the Virgin is the 12th-century Norman north doorway. The Early English Gothic west tower was built slightly later. The south aisle was added in the 14th century and the chancel was rebuilt in the 15th century with Perpendicular Gothic traceried windows.

The church plan, as existed and as chronicled in 1823 records, and in possession of John Wayland, esq. of Woodeaton, had a large courtyard entered through two elegant gates with a cross fixed at the northern part. The southern end of courtyard also had a cemetery. The main church building comprised:

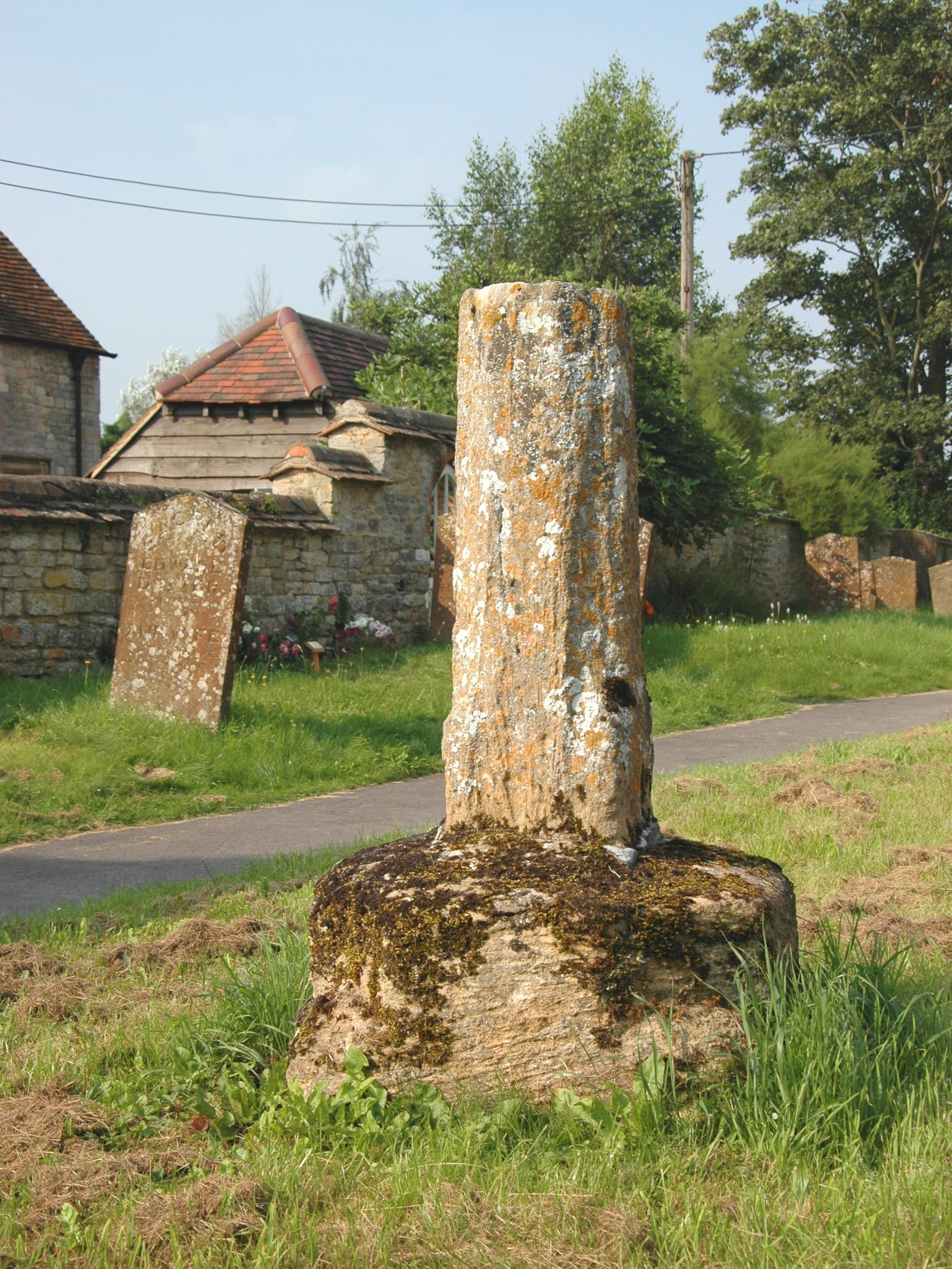
St Mary the Virgin parish church: base and broken shaft of 14th- or 15th-century churchyard cross

... an embattled tower of two stories, with a vane at each angle; a nave, a chancel, and a south aisle; the latter crowned with a parapet, pierced with trefoils and supported by three handsome buttresses, ornamented with niches, once containing statues of saints.

The south porch leads to an aisle that is lit by four two-light windows. Between the aisle and the nave is a four-bay arcade. The nave has three clerestory windows similar to those in the north wall of the church. The nave pews are 17th-century. The pulpit and reading desk are late 17th-century, added in the reign of James II. The pulpit was refurbished in 1819 with cushion and cloth given by Lady Turner, bearing insignia of the Turner family. The nave had a west gallery where there was a painting of the Resurrection of Jesus. According to inscriptions it was given by the parishioners. The church is a Grade II* listed building.

The bell tower has a ring of eight bells. The third bell was cast by Richard Keene of Woodstock in 1697. The fourth was cast by Henry III Bagley of Chacombe, Northamptonshire in 1716. Bagley had more than one bell-foundry, but the nearest was at Witney. The fifth was cast by Edward Hemins of Bicester in 1743. St Mary's has a bell cast by W. & J. Taylor in 1840, presumably at their then Oxford foundry. In 1928 Taylors cast the treble, second and tenor bells, but at their Loughborough foundry St Mary's also has a small Sanctus bell cast by Peter de Weston of London in about 1336. The ecclesiastical parish of Ambrosden is now part of the Ray Valley Benefice, and St Mary's also serves as the British Army garrison chapel.

The nearby vicarage dates from 1638. The Reverend White Kennett (1660–1728) was vicar of Ambrosden from 1685 until 1708. During his incumbency, Kennett became tutor and vice-principal at St Edmund Hall, Oxford and published a number of scholarly works. Kennett was also Rector of St Botolph's Aldgate in London from 1700, Archdeacon of Huntingdon from 1701 and Dean of Peterborough from 1707. It therefore seems likely that Kennett may have been largely absent from Ambrosden in the latter years of his tenure. He relinquished the living of Ambrosden in 1708. Kennett was consecrated Bishop of Peterborough in 1718.

== Economic and social history ==
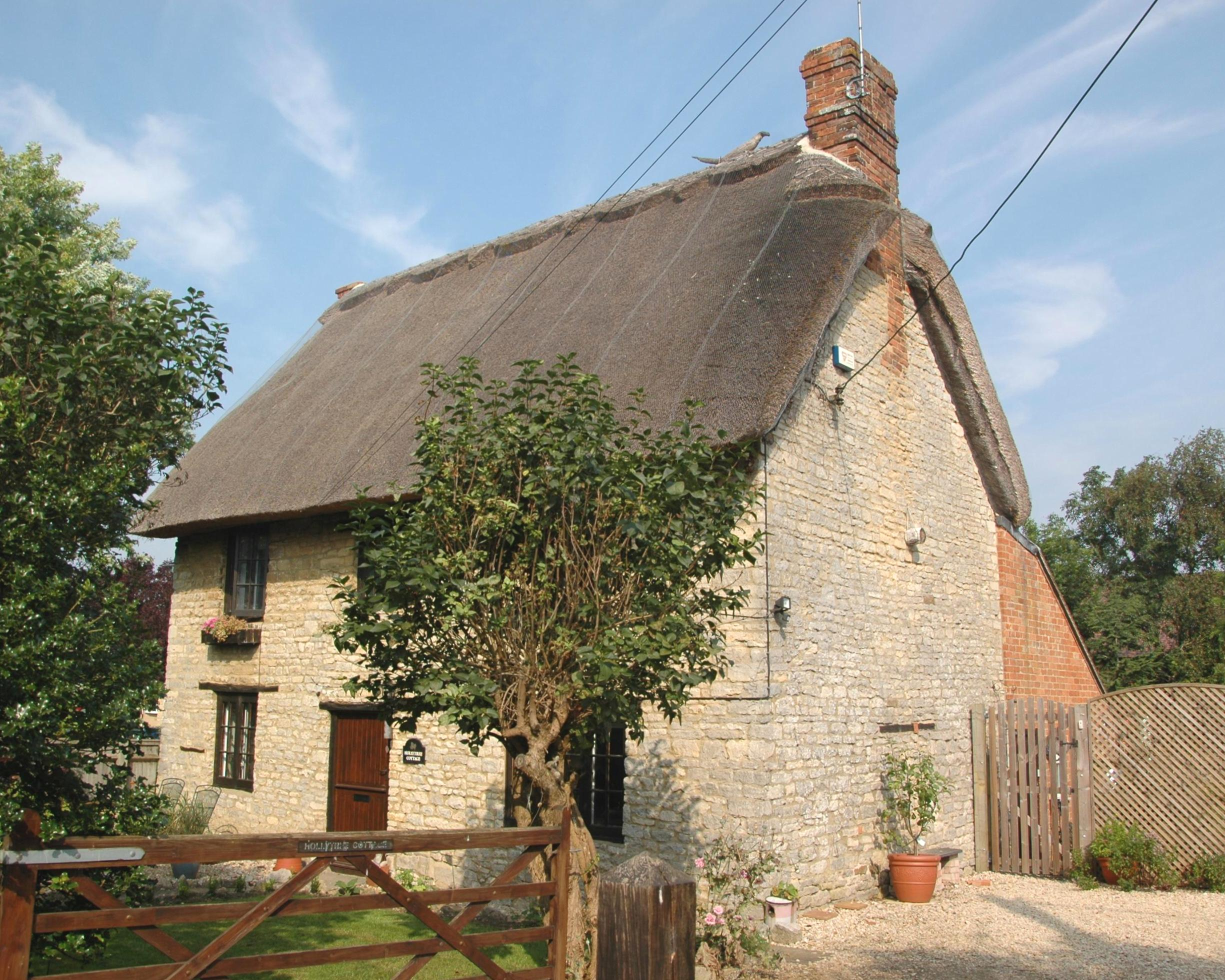
Holly Tree Cottage in Merton Road was built in the 18th century

There is a record of a windmill at Ambrosden in 1300. A document of 1633 records a Windmill Field and Windmill Way. Ambrosden was farmed by an open field system until at least the 17th century. By 1623 there had been several small Enclosures of agricultural land in the parish and by 1685 some common lands were reported to have been enclosed, with further enclosures reported between 1702 and 1785. By 1809 Ambrosden's field system was described as being completely enclosed.

In 1741 Sir Edward Turner, 2nd Baronet constructed a new road between Ambrosden and Merton. He intended the road to eventually connect to Oxford, but the remainder of the project was never completed. The road was reputed to cost a guinea a yard. The road includes a completely straight stretch of about 1 1/2 miles (2.4 km) and generally runs across level ground, although its course undulates at regular intervals, intended to use gravity to help draught animals pull vehicles.

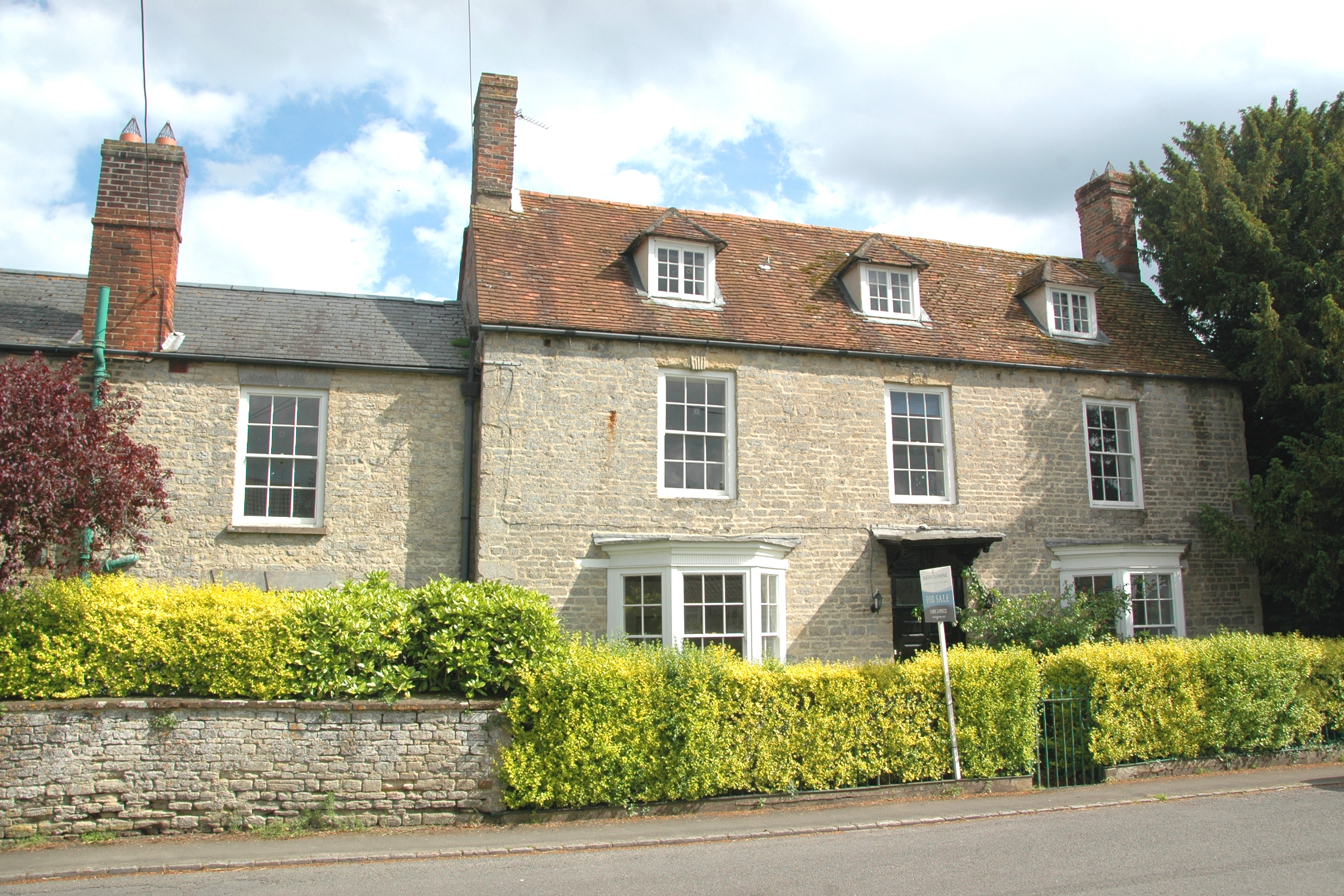
Park Farmhouse in Merton Road is Georgian, built in the 18th and early 19th centuries

In January 1764 one barge experimentally carried one load of coal from the Thames at Oxford up the River Cherwell to Islip and thence up the old course of the River Ray to Arncott. The coal was landed at Arncott Bridge and delivered thence by wheelbarrows to Sir Edward Turner, 2nd Baronet at Ambrosden House. However, the experiment seems not to have been repeated and did not establish a regular freight trade on the river. In 1811 the village had only 140 inhabitants and in 1815 the annual estate value was assessed as £1,240. The parish then included three townships: Ambrosden, Arncott and Blackthorn.

Ambrosden Old Park, where Ambrosden House had been demolished, was sometimes used for horse-racing. In 1829 Jackson's Oxford Journal complained that a race meeting in the park attracted a thousand "idlers" characterized by "dullness and stupidity" and was marred by "brutal and disgraceful fighting" despite the presence of several members of the gentry.

A parish school was opened in Ambrosden in 1818 but seems to have ceased operating by 1854. A temporary school existed in the village in 1868 and a permanent parish school building in a Gothic Revival style was completed and opened in 1876. In 1952 the primary school had an attendance of 194 pupils, including children from the War Department housing estate. In the latter part of the 20th century the school was moved to new premises and was renamed Five Acres Primary School. The 1876 school building is now the village hall.

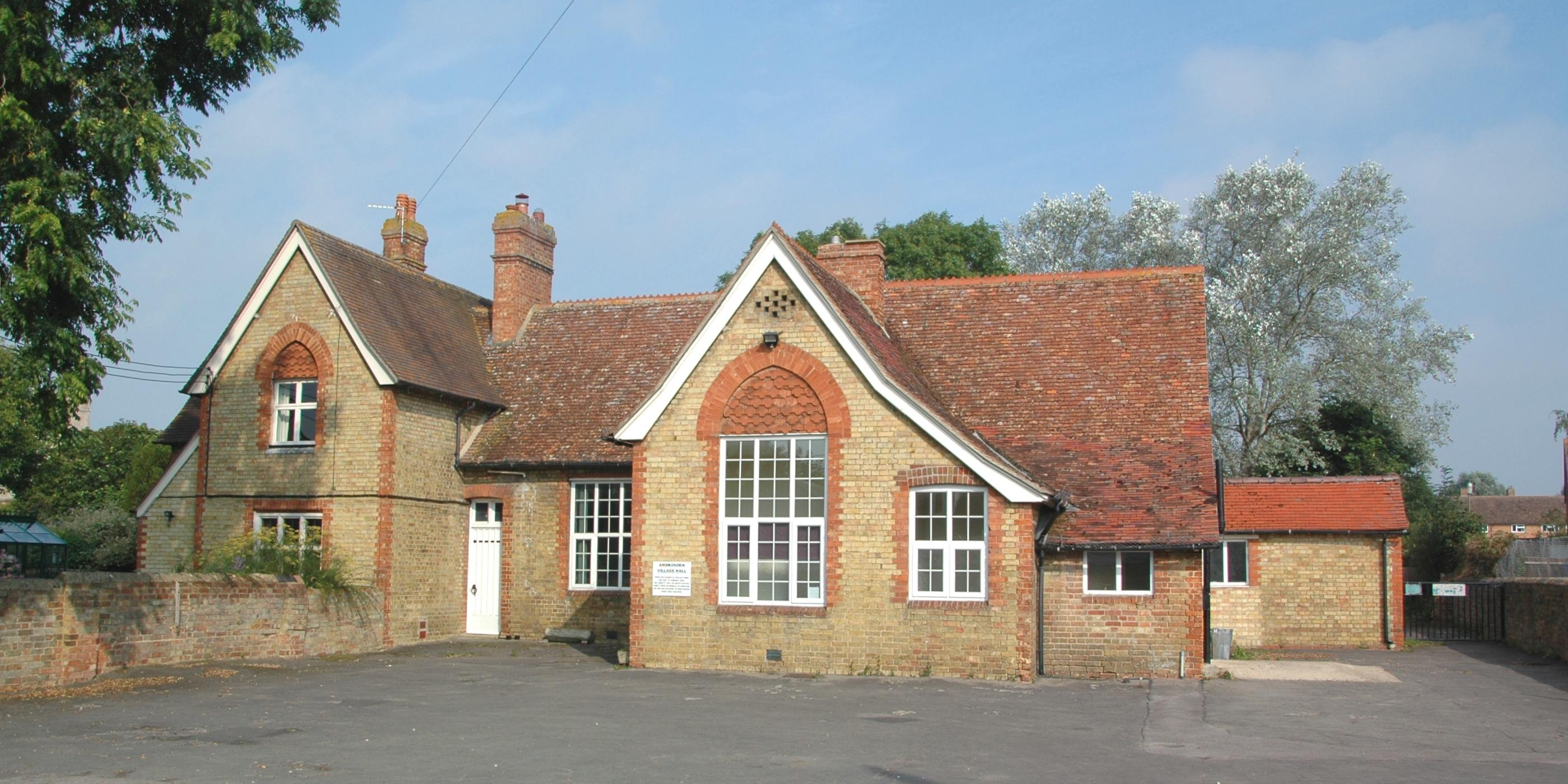
The village hall in Merton Road was built in 1876 as the parish school

The Buckinghamshire Railway's Oxford and Bletchley line was built through the northwest corner of the parish and opened in 1851. Its nearest station to Ambrosden is Bicester Town, 2 miles (3 km) north of the village. The London and North Western Railway worked the Buckinghamshire Railway from its opening and absorbed the company in 1879. This part of the Buckinghamshire Railway is now the Oxford to Bicester Line, currently operated by Chiltern Railways.

Mains electricity was introduced to Ambrosden in 1935. The Bicester Military Railway between Bicester and Piddington was built through Ambrosden in 1941 and remains in use to this day. In 1951–52 the Ministry of Defence and the Central Ordnance Depot had a new housing estate of some 200 houses built in the village. The Government bought a significant area of land from most of the farms in the parish. There are three types of house, all designed by the architect R. Potter of Salisbury, all built of brick and roofed with tiles, and many sited around a green.

The British Army, which has personnel at St. George's Barracks in nearby Arncott, has been in the village since the Second World War. Also, the military depot (considered an industrial installation related to support of military operations) was sited in Bicester during the war. This affected Ambrosden village, which adjoins the northern side of the garrison. In Ambrosden village, extensive buildings as housing accommodation and amenities were built for the military.

== Amenities ==
Ambrosden's amenities include the parish church, the Turner Arms pub, a post office, a village hall (the former school) and the current primary school. The village has also a hair salon, a car dealer and garage and a craft shop. The Army provides its personnel and their families with a community centre that includes a library, a gymnasium, a careers centre and an indoor swimming pool.

Two Stagecoach in Oxfordshire bus routes serve Ambrosden. Route 29 links the village to Bicester and HM Prison Bullingdon and provides a limited service to Arncott. Route H5 links the village to Bicester, and also to the John Radcliffe Hospital in Headington via Islip and Barton.

== Notable natives ==
Albert Freeman Africanus King (1841-1914) was born in Ambrosden, son of local physician Edward King who with the family emigrated to America in 1854. He himself became a physician, and was among those attending President Abraham Lincoln following his assassination.

== Notes ==
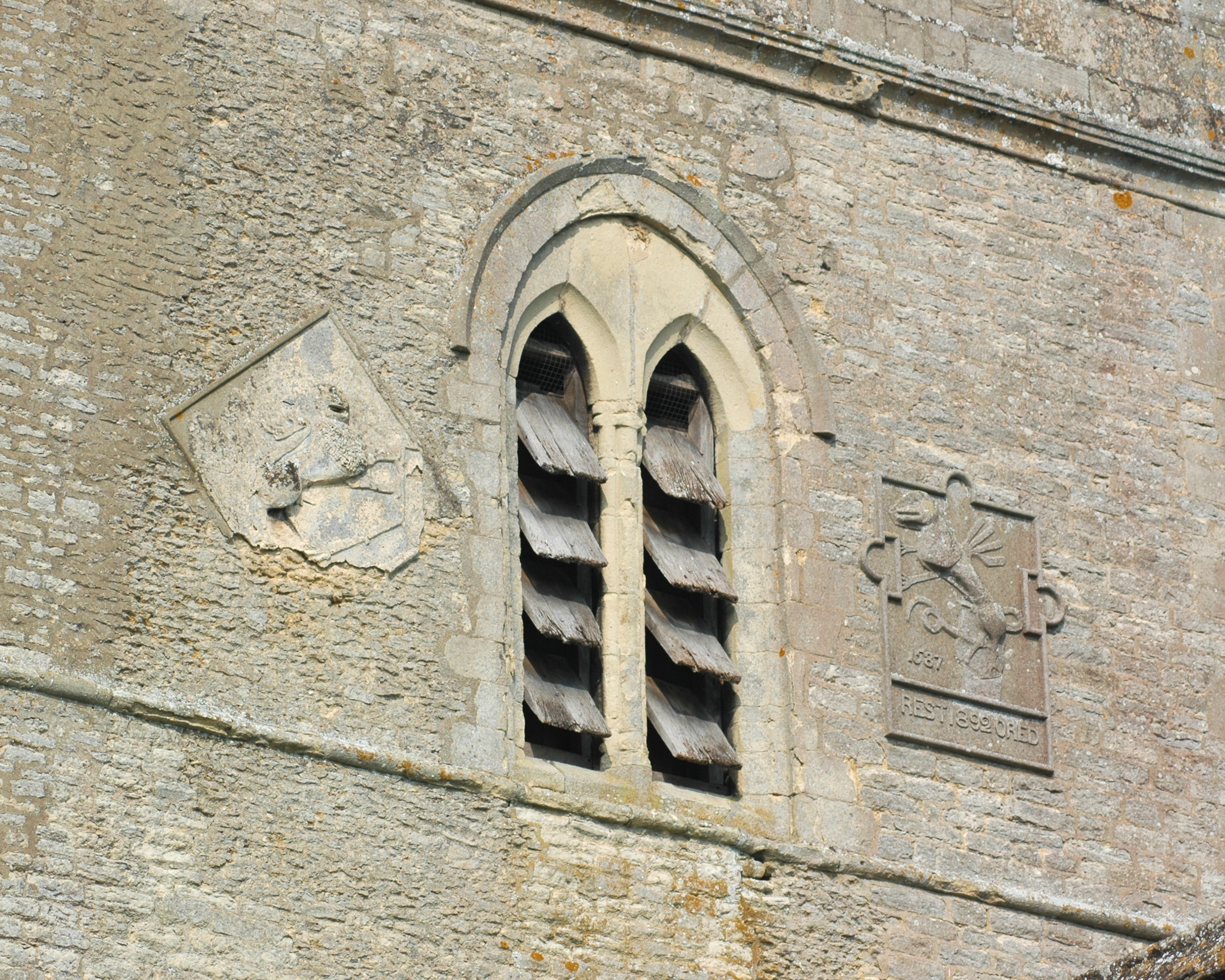
St Mary the Virgin parish church: belfry opening and pargetted panels on the east side of the tower. The panel on the left shows a lion; that on the right was made in 1587, restored in 1892 and seems to show a griffin.
