= Bicester Military Railway =

Railway in Oxfordshire, England

Coordinates: 51.869°N 1.132°W

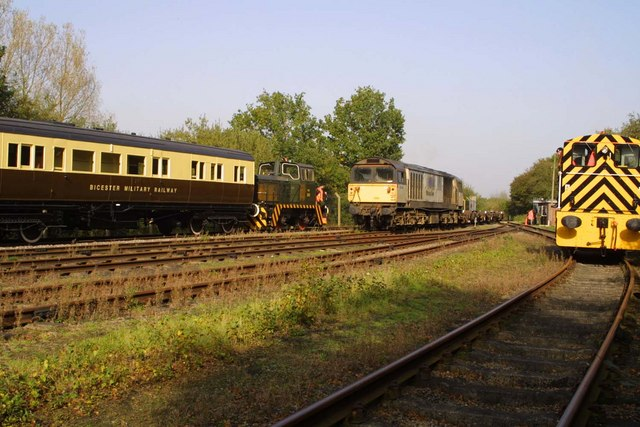
A British Rail Class 58 heads a train into the transfer sidings of the Bicester Military Railway, October 2001

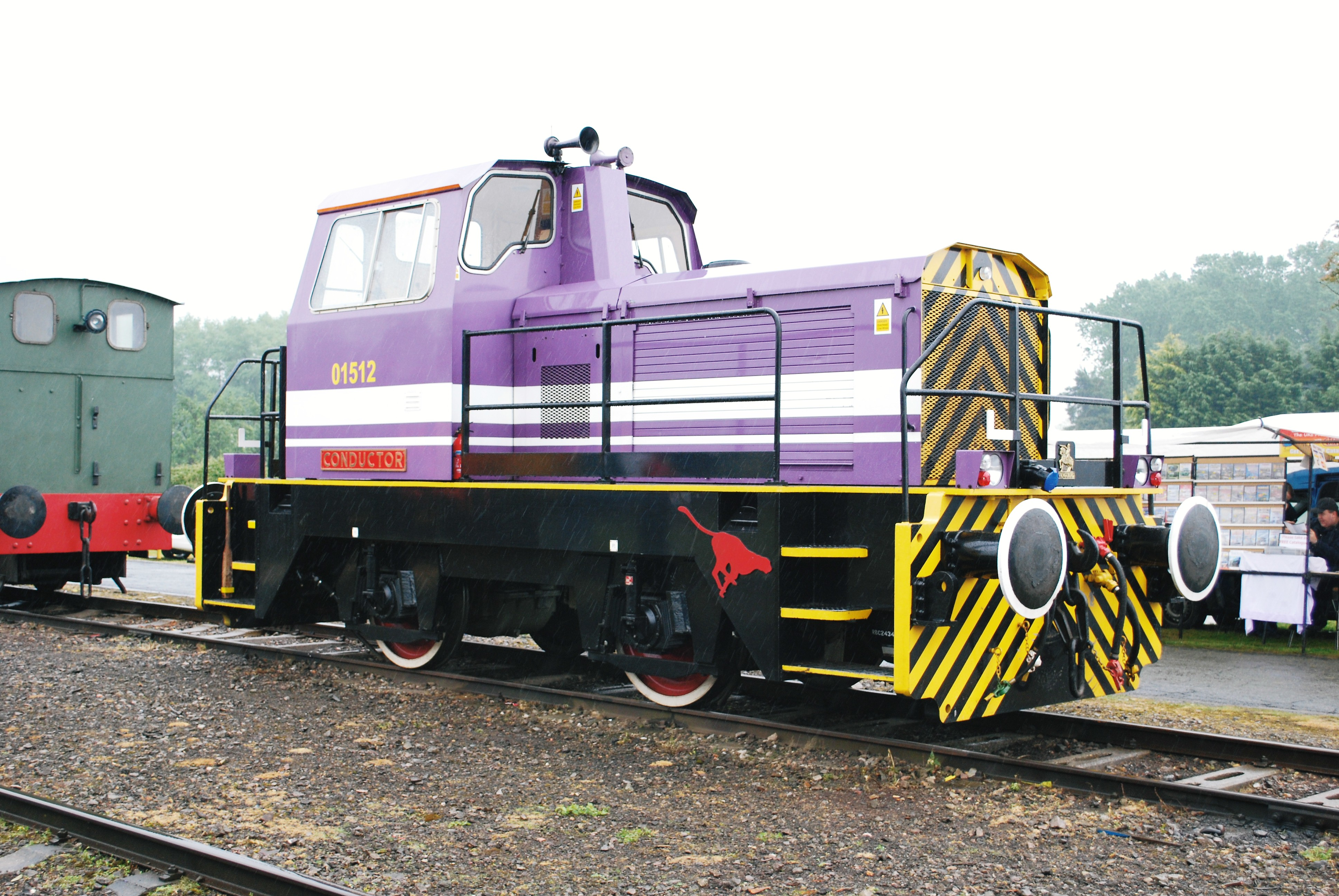
MoD No.01512 (ex-301) "Conductor", a Thomas Hill (Vanguard) 34t 0-4-0 diesel hydraulic locomotive with 255 hp Rolls-Royce C6SFL engine. On display at Long Marston Open Day in June 2009, from its home base of the Defence Storage & Distribution Centre, Bicester.

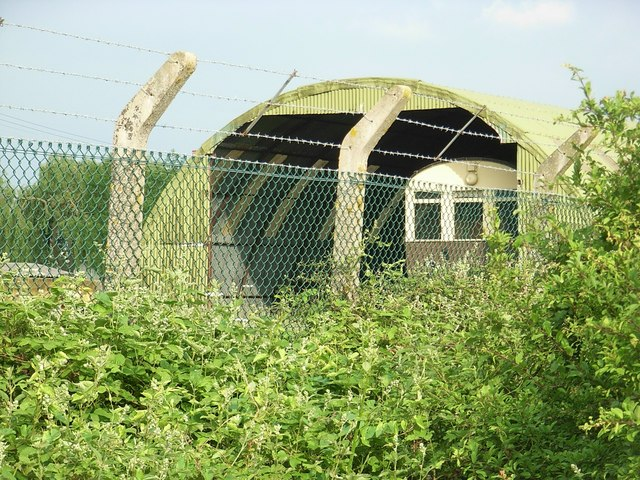
The 2-row carriage shed at the Bicester Military Railway, June 2007

The Bicester Military Railway (BMR) is a railway in Oxfordshire, England belonging to the Ministry of Defence. It links military depots at Piddington, Arncott and Graven Hill with the Oxford to Bicester Line.

== History ==
The Bicester Military Railway was built in 1942 within the Bicester Central Ordnance Depot and was used extensively in the Second World War, particularly in the preparations for D-Day.

The Prime Minister Harold Wilson visited the BMR in mid-1965 prior to a government spending review. On his orders it was spared from the railway cutbacks that were left over from Richard Beeching's railway review of the early 1960s..

== Railway Squadrons ==
The BMR has about 40 miles of standard gauge track in use. The BMR is the main base for 275 Railway Squadron, a unit of the Royal Logistic Corps. Before 1999, 275 Railway Squadron was a stand-alone Squadron. Other RLC Regiments refer to the squadron colloquially as the Railway Children. The squadron recruited exclusively from the railway industry. Every soldier in the unit was a tradesman, able to drive a locomotive, operate railway signals, shunt, and do permanent way work.

The unit's regular sister unit was 79 Railway Squadron and sometimes undertakes permanent way work with the Royal Engineers unit 507 STRE. 275 Railway Squadron's now defunct insignia is a cross section of flat bottom rail in a blue diamond. This dates back to unit's involvement with the Longmoor Military Railway.

== Sources ==
- Lawton, E.R.; Sackett, M.W. (1992). The Bicester Military Railway. Oxford Publishing Co. ISBN 0-86093-467-5.
