= Sir Edward Turner, 2nd Baronet =

British politician

Sir Edward Turner Bt
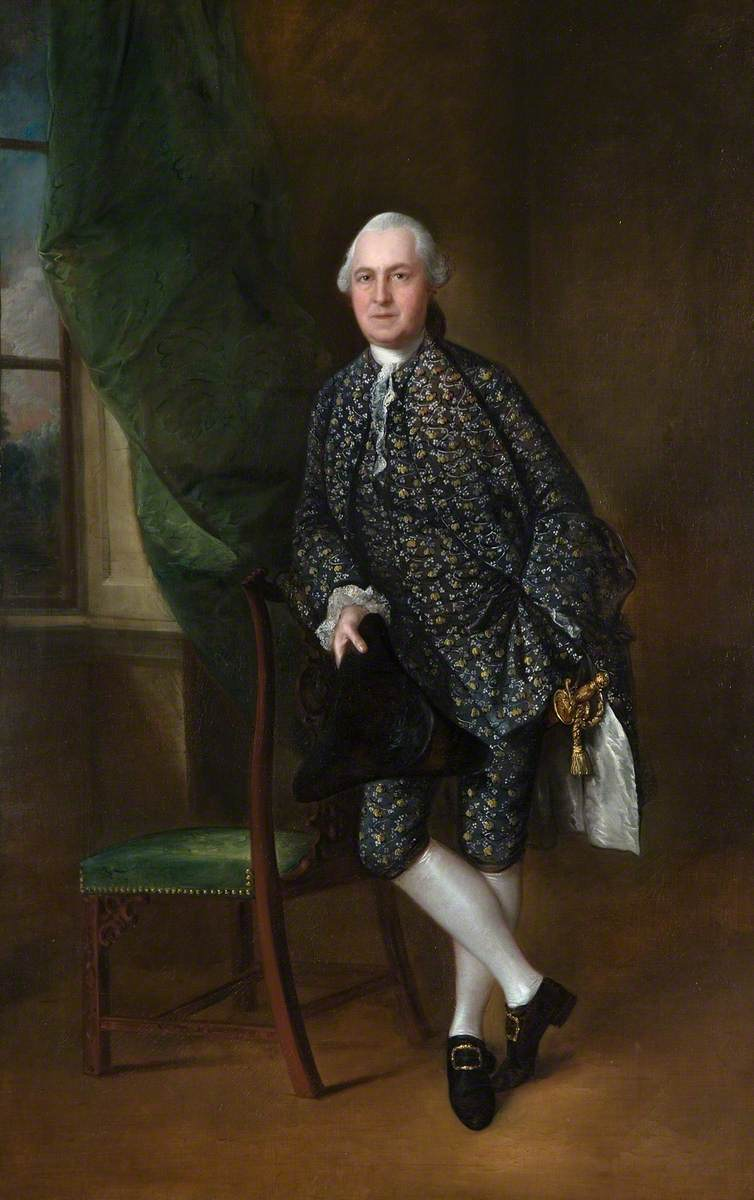
- Portrait of Sir Edward Turner by Thomas Gainsborough, 1762

MP for Great Bedwyn
- In office 1741–1747
- Monarch: George II
- Prime Minister: Robert Walpole; The Earl of Wilmington, Henry Pelham

MP for Oxfordshire
- In office 1754–1761
- Monarch: George II
- Prime Minister: The Duke of Newcastle, The Duke of Devonshire

MP for Penryn
- In office 1761–1766
- Monarch: George III
- Prime Minister: The Duke of Devonshire, The Earl of Bute, George Grenville, The Marquess of Rockingham
- Preceded by: John Plumptre
- Succeeded by: Francis Basset

Personal details
- Born: 28 April 1719
- Died: 31 October 1766 (aged 47)
- Party: Whig
- Spouse: Cassandra Leigh
- Education: Balliol College, Oxford

Sir Edward Turner, 2nd Baronet (28 April 1719 – 31 October 1766) was an English Whig politician who sat in the Parliament of Great Britain from 1741 to 1766.

== Life ==
Turner was the son of Sir Edward Turner, 1st Baronet and his wife Mary. He received his early education at Bicester Grammar School. He went on to Balliol College, Oxford where he was noted for his "distinguished scholarship and the regularity of his behaviour". He married Cassandra Leigh, niece of the Master of Balliol. He became 2nd Baronet on the death of his father in 1735. Turner died in 1766 and was succeeded in the baronetcy by his son Sir Gregory Page-Turner, 3rd Baronet.

== Estates ==
In about 1740 Turner replaced Ambrosden manor house with a large square country house of eleven bays. His architect was Sanderson Miller, who also designed ornamental buildings in the grounds. A landscaped park 5 miles (8.0 km) in circumference was laid out around the house. The park was ornamented with lakes and statues, and the drive to the house was along a semicircular avenue of trees.

Turner's new house became a meeting-place for politicians and cultivated society. Cassandra's uncle Dr. Leigh and other wits and learned men from the University of Oxford were frequent visitors.

In 1741 Turner built a new road between Ambrosden and Merton, Oxfordshire. He intended to continue it to Oxford but the remainder of the project was never executed. The road was reputed to cost a guinea a yard. The road includes a completely straight stretch of about 1.5 miles (2.4 km). It runs across level ground but its course undulates at regular intervals, apparently intended to help draught animals pull vehicles.

In 1740 Sir James Harington, 6th Baronet, who had accrued large debts by gambling, mortgaged his estate at Merton to Turner. Harington was a Jacobite and in 1747 fled into exile to join Charles Edward Stuart. In 1749 Turner foreclosed the mortgage and thereby obtained the manor of Merton. As Turner had just had a great house built for himself at Ambrosden, Turner had no need of the 16th century manor house at Merton, so he had one wing demolished and the other turned into a farmhouse.

== Political career ==
Turner was elected MP for Great Bedwyn in Wiltshire in the 1741 General Election but was not re-elected in the 1747 General Election.

In the 1754 General Election Turner stood as one of the two Whig candidates for Oxfordshire. Both they and their Tory opponents for the 1754 Oxfordshire election spent great sums of money on their campaigns, including providing lavish hospitality for electors to try to win their votes. Both parties' candidates were supported by local aristocrats. Turner and his running-mate, Viscount Parker were supported by the Duke of Marlborough, Earl Harcourt and Parker's father the Earl of Macclesfield.

The two Tory candidates won more votes but the returning officer made a "double return": declaring both pairs of candidates to be elected, leaving the House of Commons to make the decision. Both sides petitioned against the election of their opponents and the Commons examined the legitimacy of many of the individual votes. However, most MPs voted on partisan lines rather than on the merits of the case. The Whigs held a majority in the House of Commons, and therefore the two Whig candidates were declared elected.

Turner did not defend the Oxfordshire seat in the 1761 General Election. Instead he successfully stood for Penryn in Cornwall. In 1764, he purchased the manor of Wendlebury, Oxfordshire from the trustees of the 3rd Earl of Abingdon. Sir Edward died in 1766 while still an MP.

== Sources ==
- Lobel, Mary D, ed. (1957). Victoria County History: A History of the County of Oxford: Volume 5: Bullingdon hundred. pp. 15–30, 221–234.
- Lobel, Mary D, ed. (1959). Victoria County History: A History of the County of Oxford, Volume 6. pp. 14–56.
- Sherwood, Jennifer; Pevsner, Nikolaus (1974). The Buildings of England: Oxfordshire. Harmondsworth: Penguin Books. p. 422. ISBN 0-14-071045-0.

Parliament of Great Britain
| Preceded by William Sloper; Edward Popham | Member of Parliament for Great Bedwyn; 1741–1747; With: Lascelles Metcalfe | Succeeded by Lascelles Metcalfe; William Sloper |
| Preceded by Sir James Dashwood; Norreys Bertie | Member of Parliament for Oxfordshire; 1754–1761; With: Viscount Parker | Succeeded by Sir James Dashwood; Lord Charles Spencer |
| Preceded by George Boscawen; John Plumptre | Member of Parliament for Penryn; 1761–1766; With: George Brydges Rodney | Succeeded by George Brydges Rodney; Francis Basset |
Baronetage of England
| Preceded by Edward Turner | Baronet (of Ambrosden); 1735–1766 | Succeeded by Gregory Page-Turner |
