= Arncott =

Village in Oxfordshire, England

Coordinates: 51.851°N 1.113°W

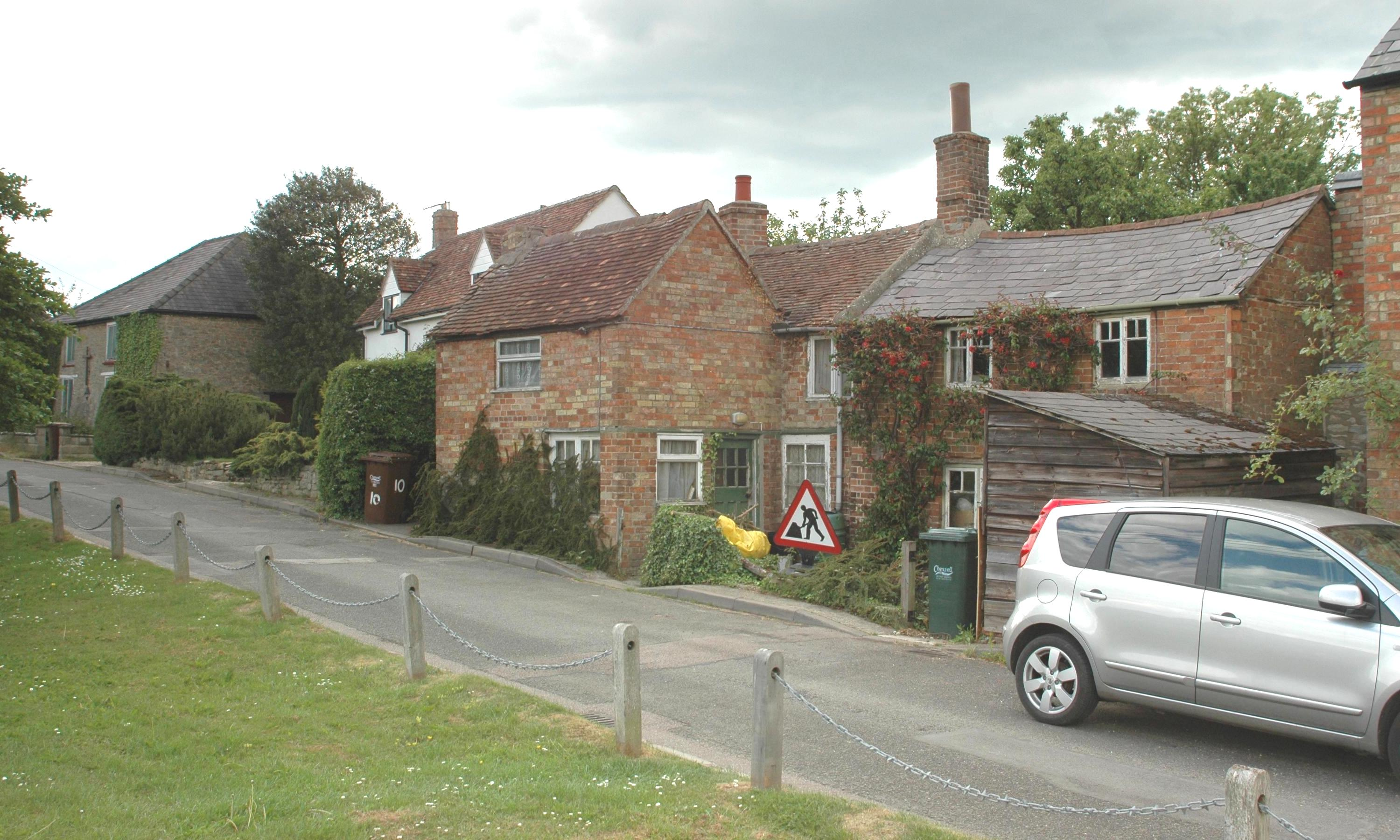
- Green Lane, Upper Arncott

- Location within Oxfordshire
- Area: 6.90 km^{2} (2.66 sq mi)
- Population: 1,738 (2011 Census)
  - Density: 252/km^{2} (650/sq mi)
- OS grid reference: SP6117
- District: Cherwell
- Shire county: Oxfordshire
- Region: South East
- Country: England
- Sovereign state: United Kingdom
- Post town: Bicester
- Postcode district: OX25
- Dialling code: 01869
- Police: Thames Valley
- Fire: Oxfordshire
- Ambulance: South Central
- UK Parliament: Bicester and Woodstock
- Website: Arncott Parish Council

Arncott or Arncot is a village and civil parish about 3 1/2 miles (5.6 km) southeast of Bicester in Oxfordshire. The 2011 Census recorded the parish's population as 1,738.

There are two neighbourhoods: Lower and Upper Arncott. Upper Arncott is the larger neighbourhood and includes the village green, recreation ground, shop and most of Arncott's housing. Lower Arncott is close to River Ray and includes the Tally Ho hotel and the Plough public house. Upper and Lower Arncott are separated by the Bicester Military Railway.

== Manors ==
Arncott's toponym comes from the Old English Earnigcote meaning "Earn's Cottage" (10th century).

=== Upper Arncott ===
In 983 Æthelred the Unready granted the manor of Upper Arncott to the Benedictine Abingdon Abbey. As a result it became known as Arncot Abbatis. In 1538 the abbey was suppressed in the Dissolution of the Monasteries and surrendered Upper Arncott to the Crown. When the church of Osney Abbey was made the cathedral church of the new Diocese of Oxford the Crown granted Upper Arncott to it as part of its endowment. However, when the church of the former Priory of St Frideswide, Oxford replaced Osney as Christ Church Cathedral, Oxford, Upper Arncott reverted to the Crown. The Crown then sold Upper Arncott to a local family, the Martins.

=== Lower Arncott ===
The Domesday Book records that in 1086 William son of Mann held Lower Arncott. In the 12th century Roger of Caux granted Lower Arncott to the Augustinian Missenden Abbey to say Mass for his late parents. In 1232 the abbey sold Lower Arncott to another Augustinian house, Bicester Priory. As a result it became known as Arncot Prioris. After the Dissolution of the Monasteries the Crown granted Lower Arncott to Thomas Martin of Ambrosden, a member of the same family that bought Upper Arncott.

The Abingdon Chronicle, a version of the Anglo-Saxon Chronicle, records that Adelelm of Jumièges, Abbott of Abingdon 1071–83, let Upper Arncott to the Norman barons Robert D'Oyly and Roger d'Ivry. The cartulary of Osney Abbey records that D'Oyly and d'Ivry in turn granted Upper Arncott to Saint George's church in Oxford Castle. In about 1149 Henry D'Oyly transferred Upper Arncott to Osney Abbey, which remained lord of the manor until the Dissolution of the Monasteries.

== Chapel and mission room ==
=== Methodist ===
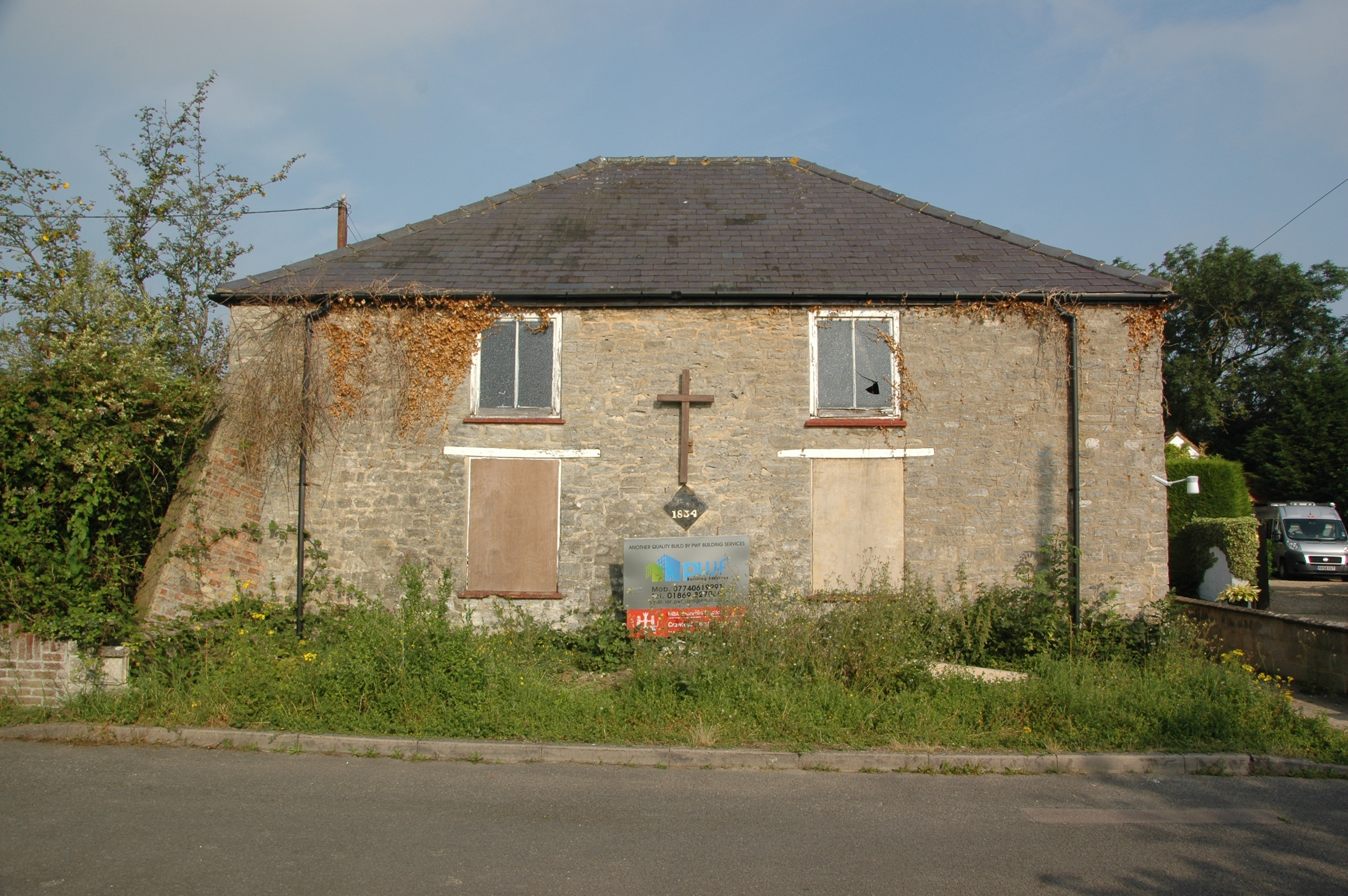
Disused Methodist chapel in Green Lane, Upper Arncott

A Methodist congregation developed in Arncott from 1823. A Wesleyan Methodist chapel was built in Upper Arncott in 1834 and enlarged in 1847. It became Upper Arncott Methodist church, a member of the Bicester District of the Buckingham, Bicester and Brackley Methodist Circuit. It is now closed, and in March 2010 Cherwell District Council granted the local Methodist Circuit planning permission to convert the building from a church into offices.

=== Church of England ===
The Church of England parish of Ambrosden includes Arncott, which therefore does not have its own Church of England parish church. Rev. Charles Bagshawe, Vicar of Ambrosden 1866–84, ran a mission room in Arncott. The mission room has since closed and Arncott is served by the parish church of St Mary the Virgin, 1 1/2 miles (2.4 km) away in Ambrosden, which is part of the Ray Valley Benefice.

== Economic and social history ==
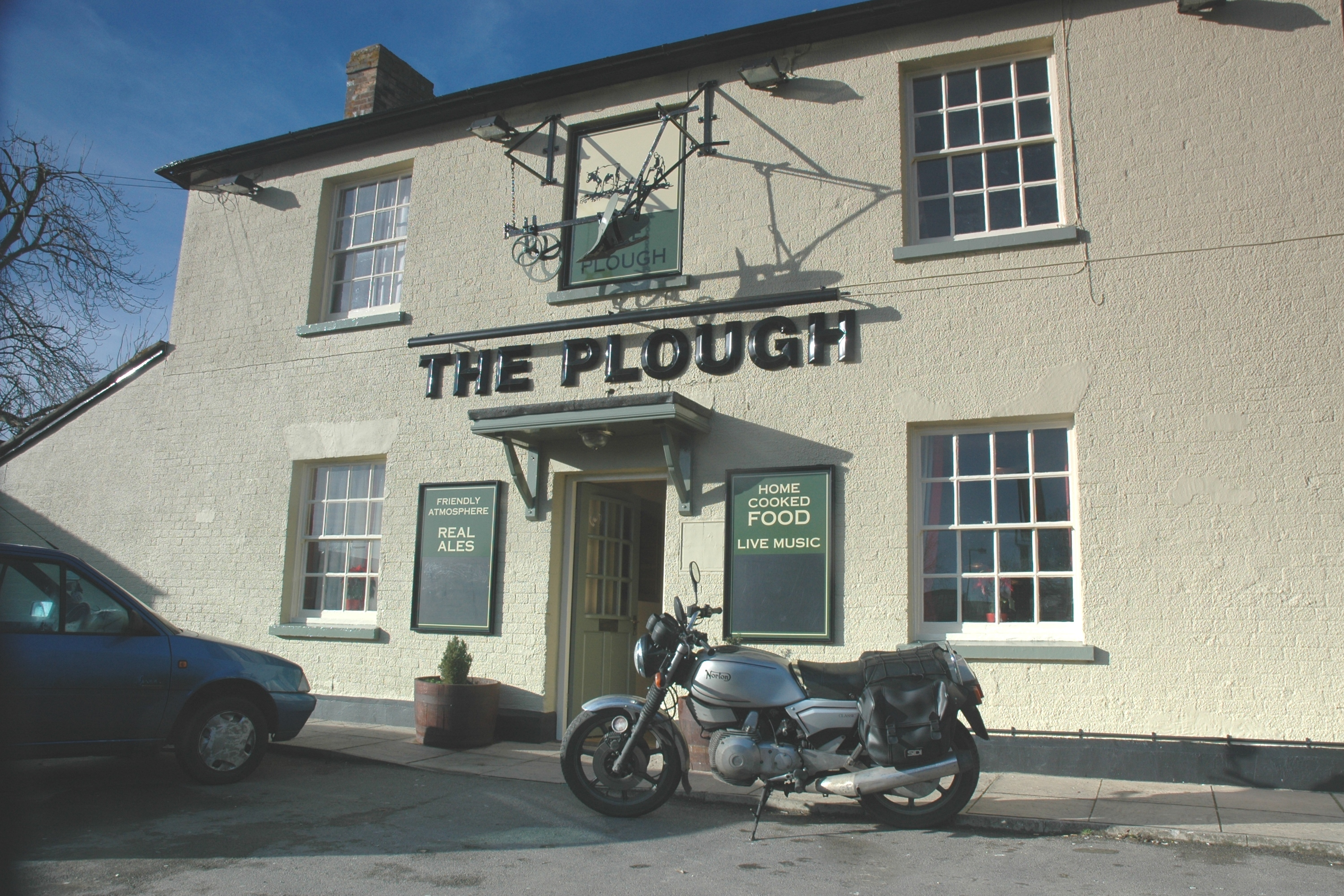
The Plough public house in Ploughley Lane, Lower Arncott

In 1281, Bicester Priory inclosed some farmland at Lower Arncott. However, an open field system of farming continued in both manors until an inclosure award was made in 1816.

A parish school was opened in Ambrosden in 1818 and Arncott had its own school by 1833. Both seem to have ceased operating by 1854, but temporary schools existed in both Ambrosden and Arncott in 1868. A permanent parish school built in Ambrosden was opened in 1876 and in the same year an infant school was opened in the parish mission room in Arncott. In 1920 Arncott School was closed and the children transferred to Ambrosden.

In 1941, during the Second World War the Central Ordnance Depot was built along with the Bicester Military Railway to link it with the Varsity Line of the London, Midland and Scottish Railway west of Bicester Town. The depot is now run by the Defence Support Group.

In 2022, Ray Valley Solar, one of a cluster of solar arrays on land adjacent to the ordnance depot, was connected to the national electricity grid. It is one of the largest community-owned solar parks in the United Kingdom.

Arncott Bridge across the River Ray on the road between Arncott and Ambrosden is a five-arched bridge built in the 18th century.

== Bus ==
Stagecoach in Oxfordshire bus route 29 provides Arncott with a limited service to Bicester via Ambrosden. There are three buses each way a day from Monday to Friday. There is no service on Saturday, Sunday or public holidays.

== Sources ==
- Lobel, Mary D, ed. (1957). A History of the County of Oxford. Victoria County History. Vol. 5: Bullingdon Hundred. London: Oxford University Press for the Institute of Historical Research. pp. 15–30.
