= The Bicester School =

Location
- Queen's Avenue; Bicester, Oxfordshire, OX26 2NS; England; 51.900813°N 1.160806°W

Information
- Type: Academy
- Motto: Aspire and Achieve
- Established: 1966
- Local authority: Oxfordshire
- Department for Education URN: 142024 Tables
- Ofsted: Reports
- Headteacher: Sam Knowlton
- Gender: Co-educational
- Age: 11 to 18
- Enrolment: 1,295
- Houses: Swift, Hawk, Falcon, Eagle
- Colours: Burgundy, Dark blue and yellow
- Website: www.thebicesterschool.org.uk

The Bicester School is a coeducational secondary school, with 1176 students (including a sixth form). It is situated in Bicester, Oxfordshire, England, and occupies a 32-acre (130,000 m^{2}) site leading off Queens Avenue.

The school's sports facilities are used by Bicester Athletic Club, which was awarded National Lottery funding to add all-weather surfaces to the sports field's jumping and throwing event areas.

== History ==
Bicester County School opened in September 1924 in a building at the junction of London Road and Launton Road (now called Hometree House). It became a grammar school in 1956 and became known as Bicester Grammar School.

Highfield Secondary Modern School, built in 1952, was the first school on the Queens Avenue site. The grammar school moved to the site in 1963, and the two schools merged in 1966 to become Bicester Community College.

The school became a government-designated specialist Technology College in 1998.

In May 2011 Bicester Community College received the Most Improved Award from the Specialist Schools and Academies Trust (SSAT) for significantly improving its 5+ A*–C results including GCSE English and Mathematic by 20 percentage points from 2007 to 2010.

Ofsted rated the school 'Satisfactory' in its 2010 inspection report. After another inspection in 2012, Ofsted downgraded their rating to 'Inadequate', the lowest of the four Ofsted tiers. The school was put in special measures in February 2013.

Oxfordshire County Council subsequently asked the Department for Education for permission to remove the board of governors, with the request being granted on Thursday 21 February 2013. A new interim executive board (IEB) was put in place to oversee the school. Principal Jason Clarke left the school by mutual agreement with the IEB, and the IEB announced the appointment of neighbouring Cooper School head Ben Baxter as interim head from April.

An Ofsted inspection in 2014 increased the school's rating to 'Good' across all categories. The school also received 'Good' from Ofsted in 2018 and 2024.

In August 2015, Bicester Community College converted to academy status and was renamed The Bicester School. The school is now sponsored by Activate Learning.
