= East Staffordshire Borough Council elections =

Local government elections in Staffordshire, England

East Staffordshire Borough Council elections are held every four years. East Staffordshire is a non-metropolitan district with borough status in Staffordshire, England. The Borough Council area of East Staffordshire covers three main settlements such as Burton-Upon-Trent, Uttoxeter and Tutbury, as well several rural towns and villages, such as Barton-under-Needwood, Stramshall, Weaver, Draycott in the Clay, Rolleston-on-Dove, Needwood and Abbots Bromley.

New ward boundaries were implemented as of the May 2023 elections, following a boundary review, electing 37 councillors from 16 wards. Between the last boundary changes in 2003 and 2023, 39 councillors were elected from 21 wards.

== Council elections ==
- 1973 East Staffordshire District Council election
- 1976 East Staffordshire District Council election
- 1979 East Staffordshire District Council election (New ward boundaries)
- 1983 East Staffordshire District Council election
- 1987 East Staffordshire District Council election
- 1991 East Staffordshire District Council election (District boundary changes took place but the number of seats remained the same)
- 1995 East Staffordshire Borough Council election
- 1999 East Staffordshire Borough Council election
- 2003 East Staffordshire Borough Council election (New ward boundaries)
- 2007 East Staffordshire Borough Council election
- 2011 East Staffordshire Borough Council election
- 2015 East Staffordshire Borough Council election
- 2019 East Staffordshire Borough Council election
- 2023 East Staffordshire Borough Council election (New ward boundaries)

== Results maps ==
2003 results map

2007 results map

2011 results map

2015 results map

2019 results map

2023 results map

== By-election results ==
=== 1995-1999 ===
Needwood By-Election 25 September 1997
Party	Candidate	Votes	%	±%
Conservative		315	31.2	+5.9
Labour		265	26.2	−3.9
Independent		237	23.5	+23.5
Liberal Democrats		193	19.1	−5.6
Majority		50	5.0	
Turnout		1,010		
Conservative gain from Labour		Swing		

Town By-Election 25 September 1997
Party	Candidate	Votes	%	±%
Conservative		386	48.4	+27.4
Labour		318	39.9	−13.9
Independent		93	11.7	−13.4
Majority		68	8.5	
Turnout		797		
Conservative gain from Labour		Swing		

=== 1999-2003 ===
Eton By-Election 7 February 2002
Party	Candidate	Votes	%	±%
Labour		288	45.4	−17.7
Conservative		185	29.2	+15.4
Liberal Democrats		147	23.2	+0.1
UKIP		14	2.2	+2.2
Majority		103	16.2	
Turnout		634	23.2	
Labour hold		Swing		

Edgehill By-Election 2 May 2002
Party	Candidate	Votes	%	±%
Labour		326	55.0	+3.5
Conservative		170	28.7	+5.2
Liberal Democrats		97	16.4	+16.4
Majority		156	26.3	
Turnout		593	21.6	
Labour hold		Swing		

Outwoods By-Election 2 May 2002
Party	Candidate	Votes	%	±%
Conservative		502	58.9	
Labour		153	18.0	
Liberal Democrats		129	15.1	
Independent		68	8.0	
Majority		349	40.9	
Turnout		852	39.7	
Conservative hold		Swing		

=== 2003-2007 ===
Stapenhill By-Election 8 September 2005
Party	Candidate	Votes	%	±%
Labour	Michael Key	624	66.6	−4.5
Conservative	Mary Crowley	268	28.6	+0.3
UKIP	Philip Lancaster	45	4.8	+4.8
Majority		356	38.0	
Turnout		937	16.0	
Labour hold		Swing		

Shobnall By-Election 29 June 2006
Party	Candidate	Votes	%	±%
Labour	William Ganley	581	41.0	−8.3
Conservative	Dilpazir Ahmed	441	31.2	+5.9
BNP	Clive Jones	291	20.6	+20.6
Liberal Democrats	Michael Rodgers	102	7.2	+7.2
Majority		140	9.8	
Turnout		1,415	31.0	
Labour hold		Swing		

Town By-Election 31 August 2006
Party	Candidate	Votes	%	±%
Conservative	Malcolm Barrett	664	64.9	+24.1
Labour	Martin Blencowe	255	24.9	+3.3
UKIP	Philip Lancaster	104	10.2	+10.2
Majority		409	40.0	
Turnout		1,023	20.9	
Conservative hold		Swing		

=== 2007-2011 ===
Stretton By-Election 14 February 2008
Party	Candidate	Votes	%	±%
Conservative	Len Milner	661	36.9	−11.6
Labour	John McKiernan	366	20.4	−7.2
BNP	Clive Jones	327	18.2	+18.2
Popular Alliance	Brian Buxton	233	13.0	−10.9
Liberal Democrats	Bryan Ambrose	205	11.4	+11.4
Majority		295	16.5	
Turnout		1,792	28.0	
Conservative hold		Swing		

Bagots By-Election 6 May 2010
Party	Candidate	Votes	%	±%
Conservative	Greg Hall	1,177	74.0	−8.5
Liberal Democrats	Charles Dean-Young	414	26.0	+26.0
Majority		763	48.0	
Turnout		1,591		
Conservative hold		Swing		

Abbey By-Election 21 October 2010
Party	Candidate	Votes	%	±%
Conservative	Colin Whittaker	604	87.8	+1.3
Labour	Liz Harman	84	12.2	−1.3
Majority		520	75.6	
Turnout		688		
Conservative hold		Swing		

=== 2011-2015 ===
Yoxall By-Election 3 November 2011
Party	Candidate	Votes	%	±%
Conservative	Beryl Behague	478	84.3	+5.0
Labour	John McKiernan	89	15.7	−5.0
Majority		389	68.6	
Turnout		567		
Conservative hold		Swing		

=== 2015-2019 ===
Stapenhill by-election 26 May 2016
Party	Candidate	Votes	%	±%
Labour	Craig Jones	536	44.3	+12.5
UKIP	Sally Green	348	28.8	−2.5
Conservative	Michael Teasel	208	17.2	−7.3
Independent	Susan Paxton	75	6.2	+6.2
Green	Thomas Hadley	24	2.0	−10.4
Liberal Democrats	Hugh Warner	18	1.5	+1.5
Majority		188	15.5	
Turnout		1,214		
Labour gain from UKIP		Swing		

Town by-election 2 February 2017
Party	Candidate	Votes	%	±%
Conservative	Philip Hudson	627	52.3	−0.3
Labour	Zdzislaw Krupski	359	29.9	−3.0
UKIP	Norman Moir	213	17.8	+17.8
Majority		268	22.4	
Turnout		1,199		
Conservative hold		Swing		

Burton by-election 16 February 2017
Party	Candidate	Votes	%	±%
Liberal Democrats	Helen Hall	271	52.7	+5.4
Labour	Phil Hutchinson	127	24.7	−5.2
UKIP	Peter Levis	60	11.7	+11.7
Conservative	Hamid Asghar	56	10.9	−11.9
Majority		144	28.0	
Turnout		514		
Liberal Democrats hold		Swing		

Horninglow by-election 4 May 2017
Party	Candidate	Votes	%	±%
Conservative	Deneice Florence-Jukes	800	44.2	+12.2
Labour	Louise Walker	756	41.8	+2.0
UKIP	Peter Levis	199	11.0	−17.2
Liberal Democrats	Hugh Warner	53	2.9	+2.9
Majority		44	2.4	
Turnout		1,808		
Conservative gain from Labour		Swing		

Shobnall by-election 4 May 2017
Party	Candidate	Votes	%	±%
Labour	Paul Walker	794	50.9	−8.8
Conservative	Colin Wood	504	32.3	−8.0
UKIP	Mike Green	113	7.2	+7.2
Liberal Democrats	Monica Douglas-Clark	96	6.1	+6.1
Green	Simon Hales	54	3.5	+3.5
Majority		290	18.6	
Turnout		1,561		
Labour hold		Swing		

Stretton by-election 28 September 2017
Party	Candidate	Votes	%	±%
Conservative	Dale Spedding	762	47.2	+2.2
Independent	Graham Lamb	455	28.2	+28.2
Labour	Cameron McKiernan	311	19.2	−0.5
UKIP	Peter Levis	52	3.2	−24.4
Liberal Democrats	Rhys Buchan	36	2.2	+2.2
Majority		307	19.0	
Turnout		1,616		
Conservative hold		Swing		

Stretton by-election 8 February 2018
Party	Candidate	Votes	%	±%
Conservative	Vicki Gould	764	42.5	−4.7
Independent	Graham Lamb	625	34.8	+6.6
Labour	Elaine Pritchard	347	19.3	+0.1
UKIP	Peter Levis	47	2.6	−0.6
Liberal Democrats	Rhys Buchan	14	0.8	−1.4
Majority		139	7.7	
Turnout		1,797		
Conservative hold		Swing		

=== 2019-2023 ===
Yoxall by-election 13 February 2020
Party	Candidate	Votes	%	±%
Conservative	Laura Beech	431	78.5	−9.0
Labour	Michael Baker	118	21.5	+9.0
Majority		313	57.0	
Turnout		549		
Conservative hold		Swing		

Eton Park by-election 6 May 2021
Party	Candidate	Votes	%	±%
Labour	Thomas Hadley	660		
Labour	Louise Walker	656		
Conservative	Michael Ackroyd	330		
Conservative	Jack Gould	247		
Liberal Democrats	Sam Goldsworthy	53		
Liberal Democrats	Hugh Warner	43		
Labour hold		Swing		
Labour gain from Independent		Swing		

Tutbury and Outwoods by-election 30 September 2021
Party	Candidate	Votes	%	±%
Conservative	Russell Lock	549	44.3	−13.5
Independent	John Anderson	464	37.5	+37.5
Labour	Dale Barr	186	15.0	−27.2
Green	Lynn Furber	39	3.2	+3.2
Majority		85	6.9	
Turnout		1,238		
Conservative hold		Swing		

=== 2023-2027 ===
Stretton by-election 26 September 2024
Party	Candidate	Votes	%	±%
Conservative	Gerry Holmes	1,012	70.8	
Labour	John McKiernan	304	21.3	
Green	Kelly Rickard	113	7.9	
Majority		708	49.5	
Turnout		1,429		
Conservative hold		Swing		
