= Branston, Staffordshire =

Village in Staffordshire, England

Coordinates: 52.787°N 1.659°W

Branston
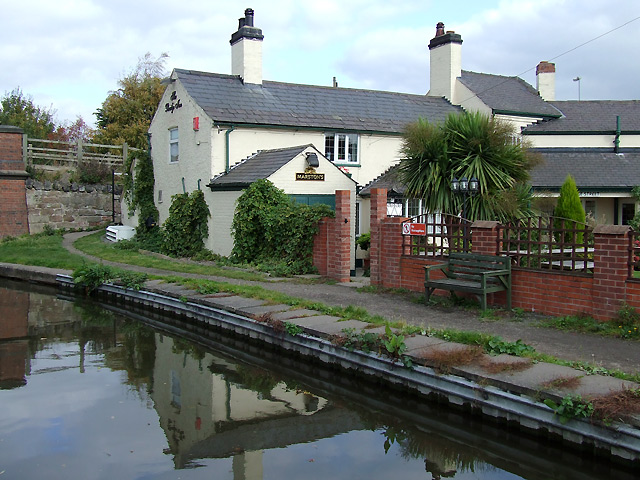
- The Bridge Inn at Branston

- Location within Staffordshire
- Population: 6,749 (2011)
- OS grid reference: SK2321
- Civil parish: Branston
- District: East Staffordshire
- Shire county: Staffordshire
- Region: West Midlands
- Country: England
- Sovereign state: United Kingdom
- Post town: BURTON-ON-TRENT
- Postcode district: DE14
- Dialling code: 01283
- Police: Staffordshire
- Fire: Staffordshire
- Ambulance: West Midlands
- UK Parliament: Burton

Branston is a parish of the town Burton upon Trent in Staffordshire, England. At the 2001 census, the population was 6,540, increasing to 6,749 at the 2011 Census.

== History ==
Branston lies beside the River Trent and to the south side of the town of Burton upon Trent. It spread in the 19th century along the main Burton to Lichfield road, which is now the dual carriageway A38. There is much 19th- and 20th-century housing along Clays Lane, north of the village, and along Burton Road to the east. The village was mainly made up of farmland and small developments until new developments were built on the A38 and around the village, officially merging it with the town of Burton.

Ryknild Street Roman road – from Wall near Lichfield to Little Chester in Derby – passes through the village. The name Branston is Old English and means an estate belonging to a man called Brant, a personal name of Scandinavian origin. The medieval village stood near the river, its position decided by its proximity to a ford.

In 942, King Edmund granted an estate at Branston to Wulfsige the Black, possibly an ancestor of Wulfric Spot, the founder of Burton Abbey, and in 1066 it was held by Godgifu (Lady Godiva), the widow of Leofric, Earl of Mercia.

By the later 18th century, the village stood at the east end of Old Road, which with Warren Lane formed the line of the medieval road between Burton and Lichfield before Main Street was laid out to the north in the early 19th century. A new village centre then developed along Main Street. A Congregational chapel was opened in 1834, and there was a post office by 1871.

A public house mentioned in 1789 was by 1818 called the Gate Inn. It presumably stood on the site of the present inn of that name at the southern end of the modern village, and took its name from the nearby toll-gate set up after the Burton-Lichfield road was turnpiked in 1729. By 1818 there was another inn a short distance to the north. Then called the White Hart, it was known as the Anglesey Arms by the earlier 1830s and still existed in 1918. A third inn, the present Blacksmiths Arms at the junction of Main Street and Old Road, existed as a beer house called the Smiths Arms in 1851.

There are two schools in Branston. Rykneld Primary School and Paget High School.

The parish church in Branston is St Saviour's, which is part of the Diocese of Lichfield.

== Branston Pickle and Branston Depot ==
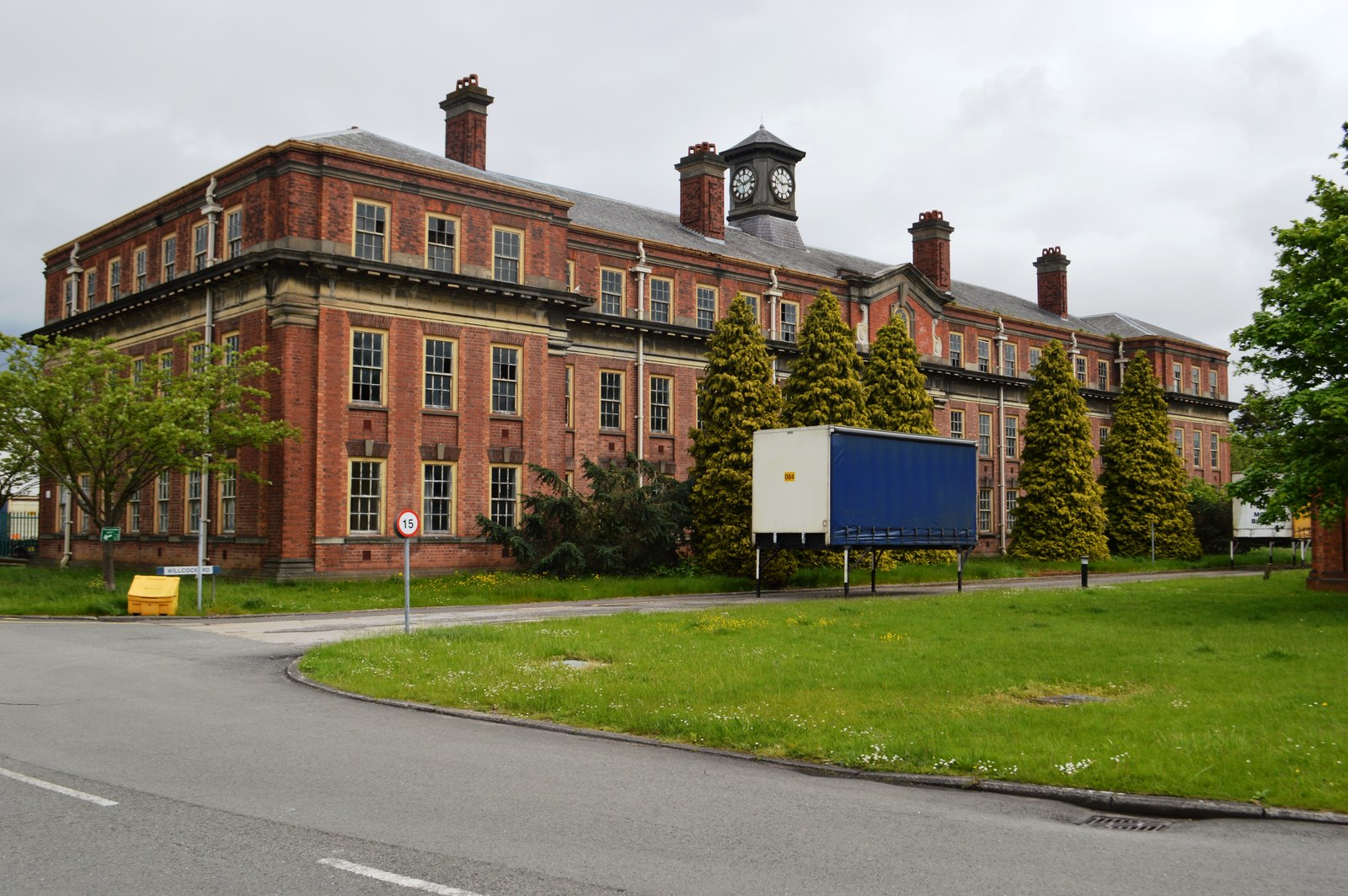
Office block built for the National Machine Gun Factory

In 1917 the government chose Branston as the location for a new National Machine Gun Factory (the location was chosen among other reasons because it was beyond the range of enemy aircraft). The factory was not completed, however, till after Armistice Day; it was equipped with machinery from the USA, but was never used for manufacturing weapons (though around a thousand guns were reconditioned there in 1919). The following year it was decided to sell the entire site.

Crosse & Blackwell made a successful £612,856 bid to acquire the factory site, which they pledged to turn into the largest and best equipped food preserving plant in the British Empire. This allowed the company to vacate its Soho properties in London. In 1922 they started to produce Branston Pickle (to a recipe attributed to Mrs Caroline Graham and her daughters Evelyn and Ermentrude) at the new factory, but this factory proved uneconomic and production was moved to another company site in London, in Crimscott Street, Bermondsey. Production at Branston ended in January 1925, leading to large scale local unemployment, with many local people boycotting Crosse & Blackwell products as a result.

The factory was then bought by Martin Coles Harman, whose Branston Artificial Silk Company produced Rayon in the factory from 1927; however it too closed, in 1930. After various short-term leases, the site was again acquired by the War Office in 1937. During the Second World War a major ordnance facility known as Branston Depot was established there: it served as the army's principal depot for clothing, as well as holding stocks of other sundry items. Branston continued to operate as a Central Ordnance Depot until when the depot closed and its operations moved to Bicester. It continued as a government facility thereafter, however, first as a civilian-run Ordnance Stores and Disposals Depot (until 1975), then as a depot for the Supply and Transport branch of the Home Office, under whose auspices it stored items ranging from Green Goddess fire engines to furniture, clothing and other items for the Prison Service. For over 20 years it held emergency food stocks for the Ministry of Agriculture, Fisheries and Food.

Since the 1990s parts of the site have been leased for warehousing or sold for housing; but a substantial area remains in use as a storage facility for the Ministry of Justice and HM Prison Service.

== See also ==
- Listed buildings in Branston, Staffordshire
- Branston Water Park
