= Dave Robertson (British politician) =

British politician

David Robertson MP
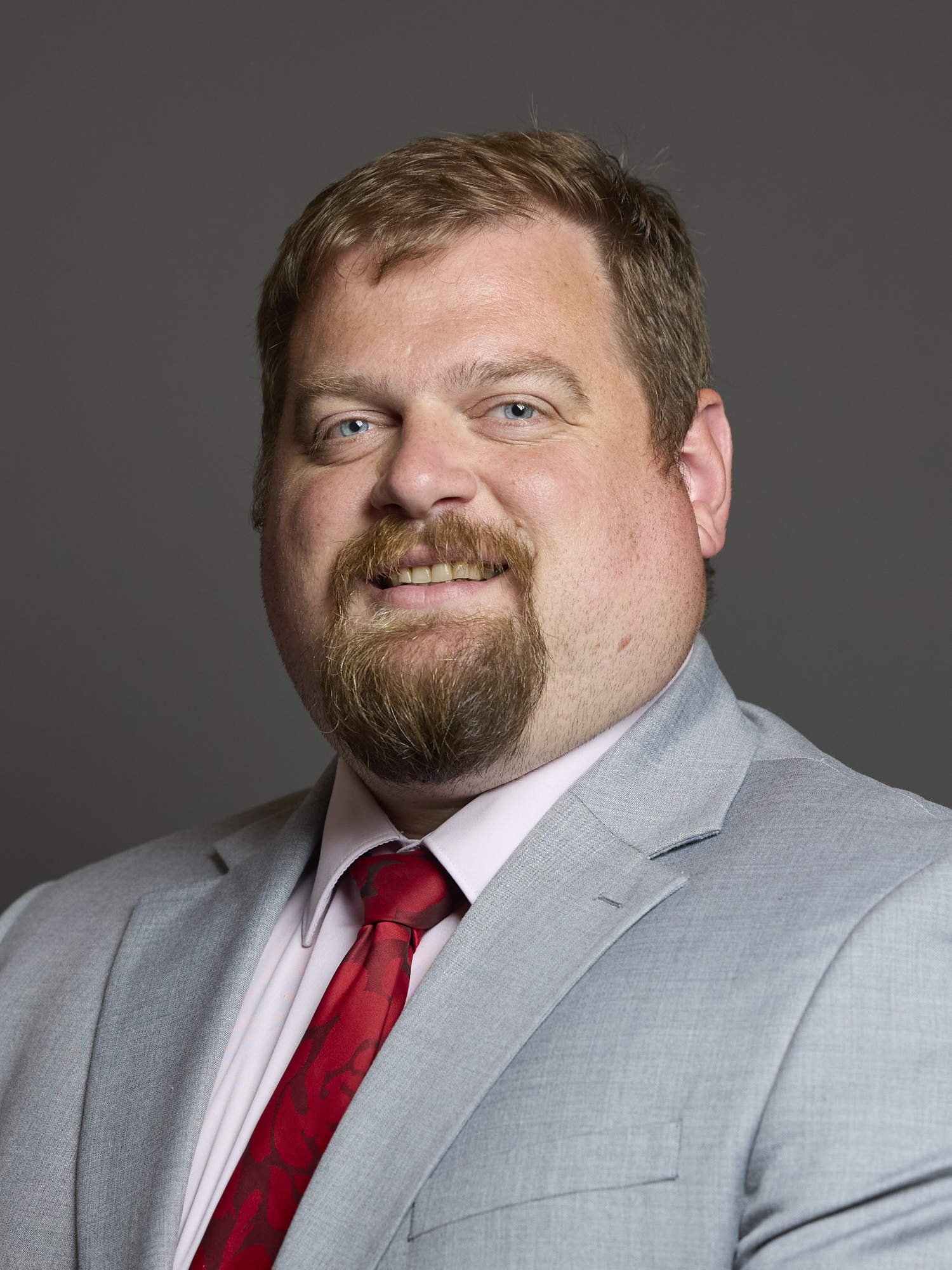
- Official portrait, 2024

Member of Parliament for Lichfield
- Incumbent
- Assumed office 4 July 2024
- Preceded by: Michael Fabricant
- Majority: 810 (1.7%)

Personal details
- Born: David Charles Robertson Lichfield, Staffordshire, England
- Party: Labour
- Education: Nether Stowe School
- Alma mater: University of Liverpool (BSc)

David Charles Robertson is a British Labour Party politician serving as the Member of Parliament for Lichfield since 2024.

== Early life and career ==
Robertson grew up in Lichfield, attending Willows Primary School and Nether Stowe School. He studied physics at the University of Liverpool, graduating with a Bachelor of Science degree. He went on to study at the University of Birmingham, where he obtained a Postgraduate Certificate in Education.

Robertson taught physics and astronomy at Great Barr School and Paget High School, before becoming a union organiser for NASUWT.

In 2019, Robertson became a member of Lichfield District Council. In February 2025, Robertson faced calls to step down from his council role after missing a fourth consecutive meeting of the Staffordshire Police, Fire and Crime Panel. The following month, Robertson confirmed his decision to resign from both Lichfield City Council and Lichfield District Council.
