= 549th Electrical and Mechanical Company, Royal Engineers =

549th Electrical & Mechanical Company, Royal Engineers
- Active: 1944–46
- Country: United Kingdom
- Branch: Territorial Army
- Role: Electrical engineering
- Part of: 11th Line of Communication Area, 21st Army Group
- Engagements: North West Europe

549th Electrical and Mechanical Company was a unit of the British Royal Engineers (RE) formed during World War II. It served in North West Europe, where it repaired damaged infrastructure.

== Origin ==
Whereas the Royal Electrical and Mechanical Engineers maintained vehicles and complex weapons and equipment, the RE's E&M companies worked with heavy electrical engineering plant, such as generators and pumps. Although termed a Company, 549 E&M Co often only had a strength of just 3 officers and 28 other ranks.

The unit's war diary begins in April 1944, when it was based at 43 Albemarle Cresecent, Scarborough. It moved to Arncott Depot for training, where it came under the command of No 11 Lines of Communication Area which would play a crucial role in maintaining the beachhead once the invasion of mainland Europe (Operation Overlord) began.

== Normandy ==
The company travelled to Southampton on 10 July 1944 and on 14 July disembarked from HMS Princess Astrid in Normandy. For the next few weeks most of its work involved establishing water-points in the beachhead area for 21st Army Group, often under fire from German artillery.

== Caen ==
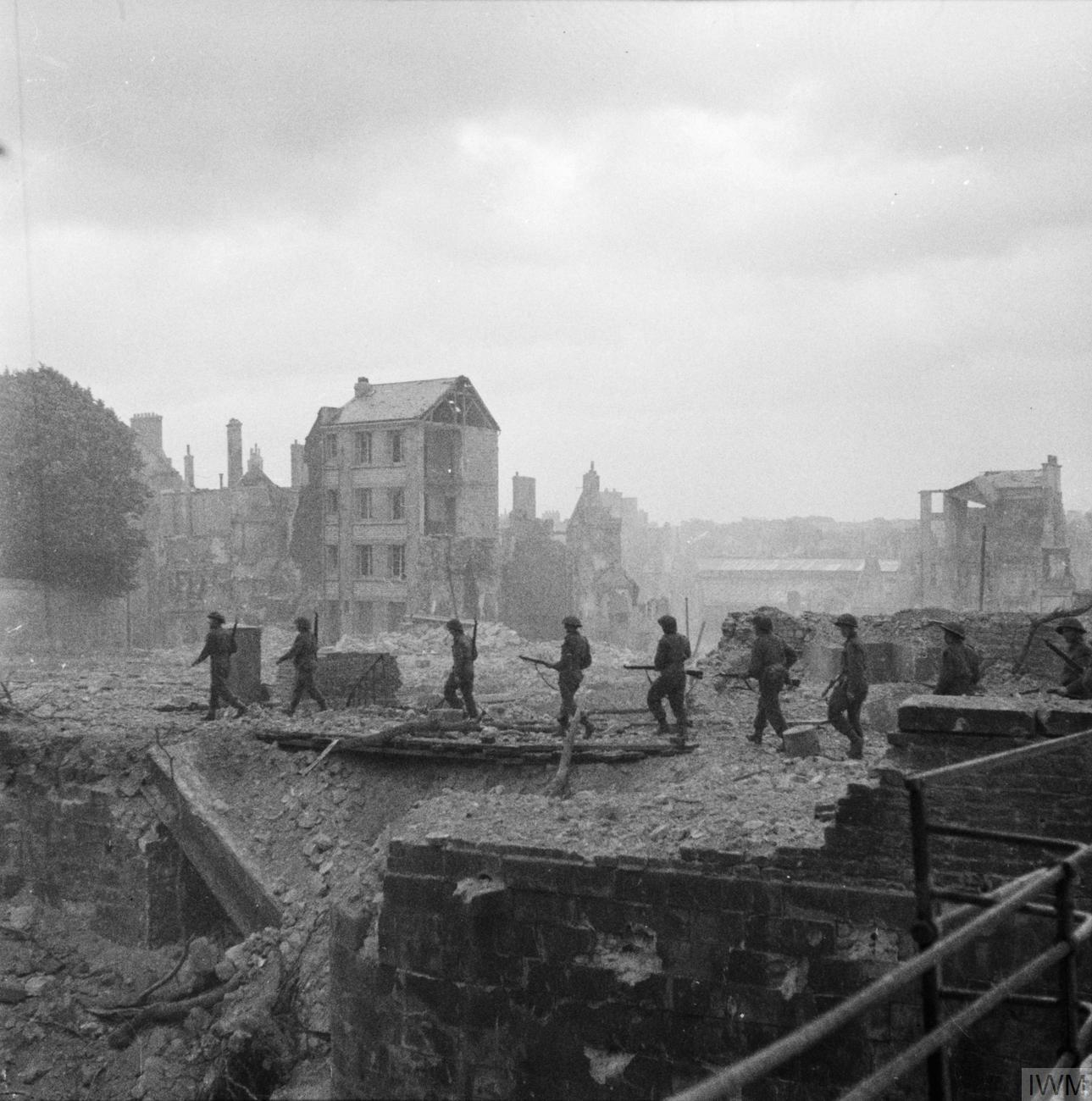
Royal Engineers comb through the ruins of Caen in July 1944.

In late August the company HQ was sent to Caen to start work on rebuilding the electricity power station. The town and surrounding country relied for its power on this installation, which had been wrecked by Allied bombing. 'First inspection presented a gloomy picture. There was no roof and little remained of the walls but the steel stanchions, and the machinery and boilers were buried under pules of rubble. When the latter was cleared somewhat it was seen that the situation was not so bad as it had appeared. It was found that two turbo-generators could be put into commission at reduced load if certain damaged parts could be replaced by parts taken from others in a worse state. The boilers were found to be capable of raising steam to meet this reduced load after overhaul and similar replacements. Similarly sufficient switchgear was assembled by cannibalization to meet initial requirements'.(RE History)

The Chief Engineer of 21st Army Group's Lines of Communications later described the first day of operation of this patched-up installation:

'When the steam valves were opened clouds of steam came out of the main pipes from many unauthorized places, but gradually the turbine began to turn, slowly working up speed as the throttle was opened till about 1,000 revs. per minute had been reached.

'At this point horrible expensive noises came from the interior of the turbine. Steam was hastily shut off, and when the machine had come to rest it was examined anxiously. No apparent damage had been done, so the R.E. officer in charge decided to try again in the afternoon.

'Speed was slowly built up, with everyone on the alert for any unusual noise, but nothing occurred, and the turbine reached its normal running speed without mishap.

'The first large electrical installation in France had been made to work amid the wreckage all around'.

Restoring the power meant that Caen docks and railway workshops could function, the rail line through Caen could be reopened, and US Engineers could build transmission lines from the power station to restart the electricity grid in the area.

== Antwerp ==
549 E&M Company completed work at Caen Power Station at the end of November and moved to the port of Antwerp in Belgium, which had recently been opened by the Allies. Mobile generating plants on railway trains and ships were linked up to provide power. This work was done under occasional long-range artillery fire, which damaged some equipment, and the sustained bombardment of the city by V-1 flying bombs and V-2 rockets, which damaged the company's barracks. As soon as the floating power stations were in operation, 549 Company began building a 20-mile power line to supply the liberated parts of the Netherlands. To do this, the company had to locate and lift several hundred anti-tank and anti-personnel mines from the route of the power line. Work to restore the Belgian and Dutch power grids, and to provide electricity for the large Prisoner of War camps, was still continuing when the war in Europe ended in May 1945.

== Germany ==
After VE Day and into 1946 until disbandment, the company often with as many as four platoons under command) continued working in Germany as part of British Army of the Rhine on restoring power and water supplies, and tasks such as installing traffic lights on British Bailey bridges and German autobahns. 549 Company RE was not reformed after the war.

== Awards ==
549 E&M Company's commanding officer, Temporary Major Thomas Martin, was awarded a US Bronze Star for his work in this campaign.
