= Listed buildings in Branston, Staffordshire =

Branston is a civil parish in the district of East Staffordshire, Staffordshire, England. The parish contains twelve listed buildings that are recorded in the National Heritage List for England. All the listed buildings are designated at Grade II, the lowest of the three grades, which is applied to "buildings of national importance and special interest". The parish contains the village of Branston, which is to the south of the town of Burton upon Trent, and the surrounding area. In the village is Branston Depot, and three buildings associated with this are listed. The Trent and Mersey Canal passes through the parish, and the listed buildings associated with this are a milepost and a footbridge. The other listed buildings are three farmhouses, three mileposts on roads, and a war memorial.

== Buildings ==
Name and location	Photograph	Date	Notes
Court Farmhouse and wall 52.78750°N 1.67476°W	—	Late 17th century	The farmhouse, which was largely rebuilt in the 19th century, is in red brick with some diapering, quoins, and a tile roof. There are two storeys, three bays, and a lower two-bay wing to the right. On the front is a bay window with a dentilled cornice, containing a segmental-headed doorway. The windows are casements with segmental heads, and to the southeast is a boundary wall about 1 metre (3 ft 3 in) high and 20 metres (66 ft) long.
Canal milepost south of Bridge 34; 52.78904°N 1.67971°W		1819	The milepost is on the towpath of the Trent and Mersey Canal. It is in cast iron, it has a circular shaft with a domed top, and a convex divided plate inscribed with the distances in miles to Preston Brook and to Shardlow. At the base of the shaft is an inscription with the date and initials relating to the manufacturer.
Canal bridge No. 35; 52.78177°N 1.68669°W		Early 19th century	A footbridge over the Trent and Mersey Canal, it is in red brick, and consists of a single segmental arch. The bridge has stone half-round coping and concave faces with parapets dying into the ground.
Pool Green Farmhouse; 52.80107°N 1.69901°W	—	Early 19th century	A red brick farmhouse with a dentilled eaves course and a tile roof. There are three storeys, four bays, and a lower two-storey wing recessed on the left. On the front is a gabled porch that has cusped and fretted bargeboards with trefoil patterns. The windows are three-light casements with segmental heads.
Postern House Farmhouse; 52.80641°N 1.69504°W	—	Early 19th century	The farmhouse is in red brick and has a tile roof with verge parapets. There are two storeys, a double-depth plan with two parallel ranges, and a front of three bays. On the front is a gabled porch and a doorway with pilasters. The windows are casements.
Milepost, Burton Road; 52.78769°N 1.65509°W		19th century	The milepost is on the north side of the B5018 road. It is in cast iron with a triangular plan and a cambered top. On the top is inscribed "BRANSTONE PARISH", and on the sides are the distances to Alrewas, Lichfield, and Burton upon Trent.
Milepost, Henhurst Hill; 52.81224°N 1.69710°W		19th century	The milepost is on the south side of the B5017 road. It is in cast iron with a triangular plan and a cambered top. On the top is inscribed "ROLLESTONE", on the sides are the distances to Abbots Bromley, Newborough, Marchington, Uttoxeter, and Burton upon Trent, and on the base is the founder's mark.
Milepost, Main Street; 52.78699°N 1.67159°W		19th century	The milepost is on the south side of Main Street. It is in cast iron with a triangular plan and a cambered top. On the top is inscribed "BRANSTONE PARISH", and on the sides are the distances to Alrewas, Lichfield, and Burton upon Trent.
Canteen, Branston Depot; 52.78821°N 1.65488°W		1918	The building is in brick with slate roofs and coped gable ends. There is one storey. In the centre is a three-bay projection, flanked by six-bay loggias with flat roofed openings divided by brick piers, above which is a dentilled course below a parapet. The windows are metal multi-paned casements.
Office block, Branston Depot; 52.78868°N 1.65653°W		1918	The office block is in red brick with stone dressings and a slate roof, and is in Edwardian Baroque style. There are three storeys, and a front of 15 bays, flanked by three-bay end blocks and with a central projecting pedimented bay. The whole has a dentilled Tuscan entablature supported by Tuscan pilasters. In the centre are double doors with a moulded architrave and a broken pediment, and the windows are ashes.
Pump House, Branston Depot; 52.78835°N 1.65650°W	—	1918	The pump house is in red brick with artificial stone dressings and a flat roof, and is in Edwardian Baroque style. There is one storey, a square plan, and fronts of three and five bays. The corners are canted with paired pilasters, and above is a corniced entablature. The windows have semicircular heads, moulded sills, recessed aprons, and triple keystones. The doorway has a moulded surround with pilasters.
War memorial 52.78770°N 1.66873°W	—	c. 1920	The war memorial stands in an enclosure on the south side of Main Street. It is in sandstone and consists of a Latin cross on a moulded foot, a square plinth with a moulded top and base, on a two-stepped polygonal platform. On the front of the cross is a recess, and below it is a foliate relief carving. On the front of the plinth is an inscription and the names of those lost in the First World War, and there is a later block with an inscription and the names of those lost in the Second World War.
