= Branston Water Park =

Nature reserve in Staffordshire, England

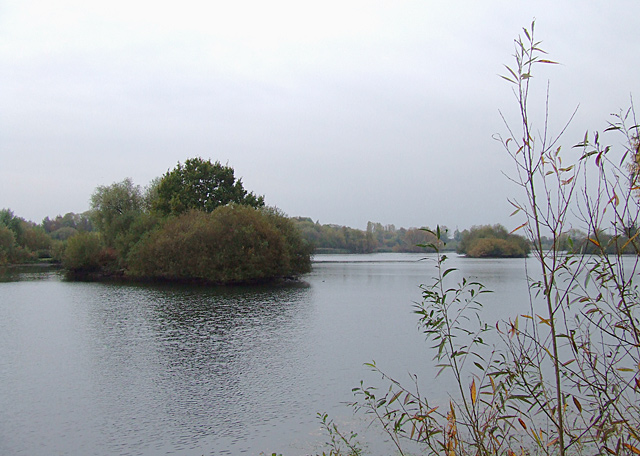
- Looking across the lake

- Location within Staffordshire
- Interactive map of Branston Water Park
- Location: Burton upon Trent
- OS grid: SK 215 208
- Coordinates: 52°47′4″N 1°41′2″W
- Area: 23.55 hectares (58.2 acres)
- Designation: Local nature reserve
- Website: Branston Water Park

Branston Water Park is a local nature reserve near Burton upon Trent, in Staffordshire, England, adjacent to the village of Branston.

== History ==
The lake is a former gravel pit, one of several along the Trent Valley. There was gravel extraction here from the 1930s to the 1950s, after which wildlife habitats developed naturally. In the mid-1980s the land was leased by East Staffordshire Borough Council; public access was introduced, and the site was developed as a country park, with pathways, signage and a visitor centre.

The reserve was designated a local nature reserve (LNR) in 2010. As of 2020, it has held the Green Flag Award since 2005.

== Description ==
The Trent and Mersey Canal passes alongside the site to the north-west; to the south- east is the A38 road.

Its area is 23.55 hectares (58.2 acres). It is a notable wetland site, and around the lake is woodland, predominantly of willow and birch, and wildflower meadow. There is a large reed bed, which is a Grade 1 Staffordshire Site of Biological Importance.

There is a flat circular path around the lake, and there are picnic areas and a children's play area. The Burton Mutual Angling Association and the Burton Model Boating Club use the park by agreement with East Staffordshire Borough Council.
