= 2015 East Staffordshire Borough Council election =

2015 UK local government election

Results of the 2015 East Staffordshire Borough Council election

The 2015 East Staffordshire Borough Council election took place on 7 May 2015 in Staffordshire, to elect members of the East Staffordshire Borough Council. It was held as part of the 2015 United Kingdom local elections.
