= Branston Depot =

Factory in Branston, Staffordshire, England

- Branston, Staffordshire
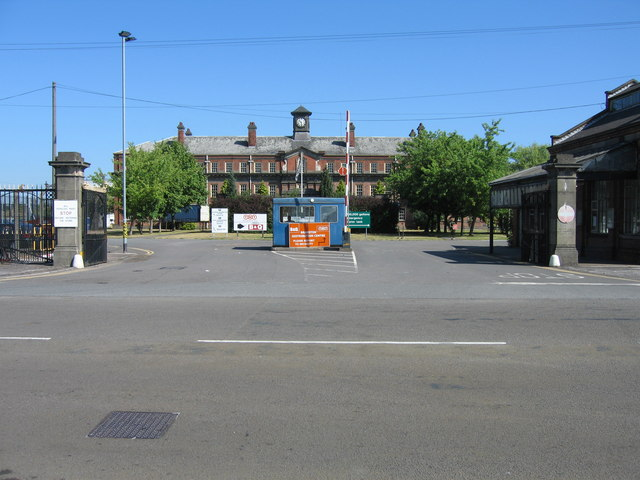
- Branston Depot

Site information
- Type: Depot
- Owner: Ministry of Defence
- Operator: British Army

Location
- Location within Staffordshire
- Coordinates: 52.7886°N 01.6564°W

Site history
- Built: 1917–1918
- Built for: War Office
- In use: 1940-1961; 1964-1975

Branston Depot is a former ordnance facility at Branston, Staffordshire.

== History ==
The site was originally conceived as the National Machine Gun Factory but by the time construction was completed in November 1918 the First World War was over and no machine guns were ever manufactured there. Crosse & Blackwell briefly used the factory for producing pickle (Branston Pickle) between 1920 and 1925 and the Branston Artificial Silk Company produced Rayon there between 1927 and 1930. In the late 1930s the site was again acquired by the War Office, purchased and converted at a cost of £500,000, to serve as the Army's main clothing depot. During the Second World War Branston Depot served as a major ordnance facility; the depot closed in 1961 when operations moved to Bicester. Parts of the site were used for the storage of components for Royal Ordnance between 1964 and 1975 and more recently parts of the site have been developed for housing.

== See also ==
- Listed buildings in Branston, Staffordshire
