= St Saviour's Church, Branston =

Coordinates: 52.787594°N 1.667831°W

Saint Saviour's
- Saint Saviour's, Branston
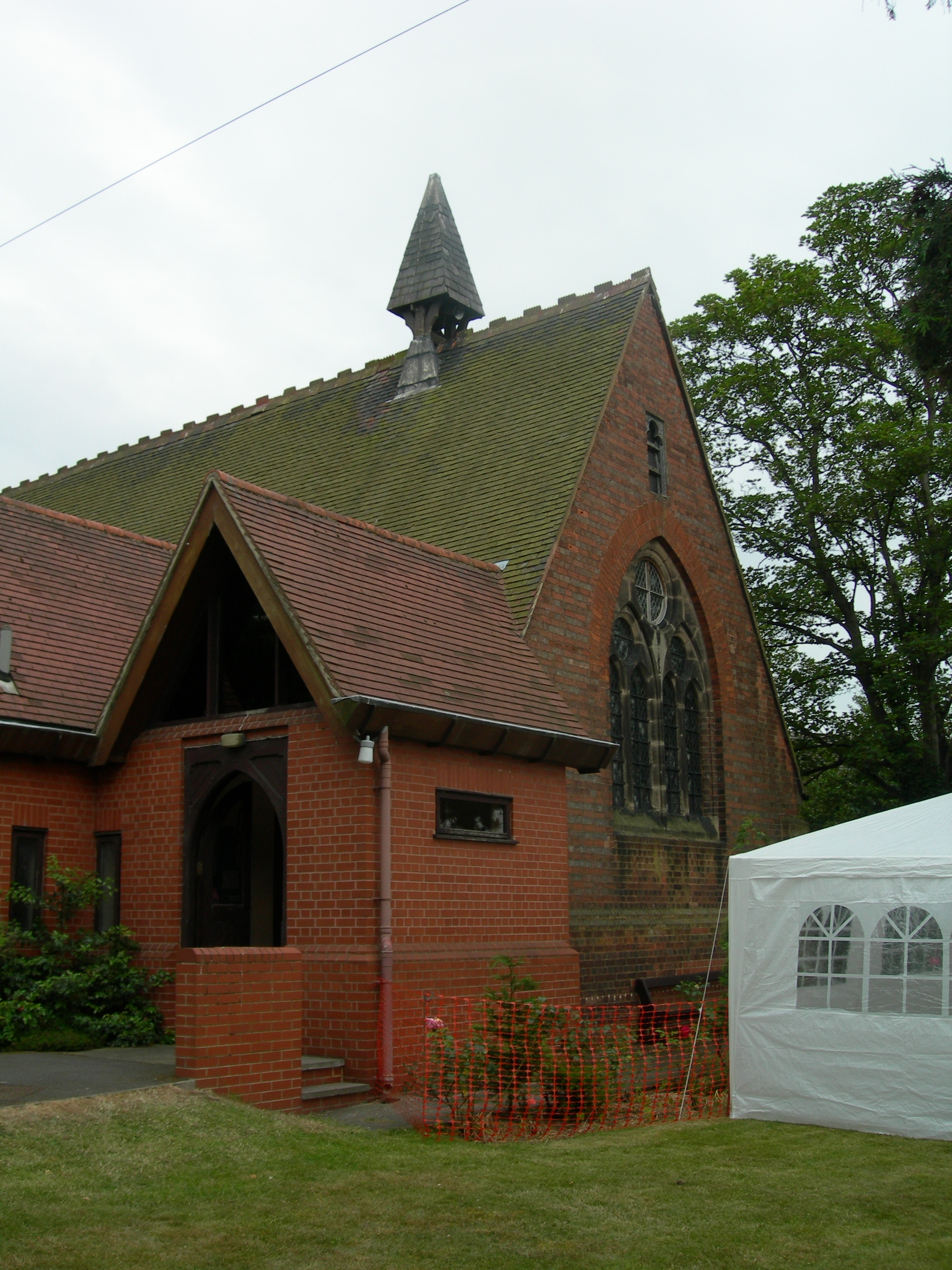
- St Saviour's porch and bell turret

- Branston shown within Staffordshire
- OS grid reference: SK 225 212
- Location: Branston, Staffordshire
- Country: England
- Denomination: Church of England
- Website: stsavioursbranston.co.uk

Administration
- Province: Province of Canterbury
- Diocese: Diocese of Lichfield

Clergy
- Vicar: Dave Collier

Saint Saviour's is the Church of England parish church for the village of Branston, south of Burton upon Trent. It is part of the Diocese of Lichfield.

The church was built in 1864, designed by the architect, Vincent Cook.

The church building was originally single-celled, with a bell turret at its western end. It contains an organ chamber and vestry, with a stone reredos installed in memory of the first vicar, John Bramell (1871–1897).

A porch was built in 1981 at the southern end of the church, to replace an early predecessor. At the same time, a meeting room was built on the front of the building.

In 1993, stained glass from St James' Church, Derby was placed in the east window.

The original vicarage, to the northeast of the church, is now a successful restaurant, aptly named The Old Vicarage. A new vicarage was built behind the church in 1985.

== Vicars at St Saviour's ==
- John Bramell (1871–1897)
- TBC
- David Simmonds
- Tony Humphries (2003–2007)
- Preb. Mick Ellor (2007 - 2017)
- Revd Capt Dave Collier (2018-)

== Gallery ==
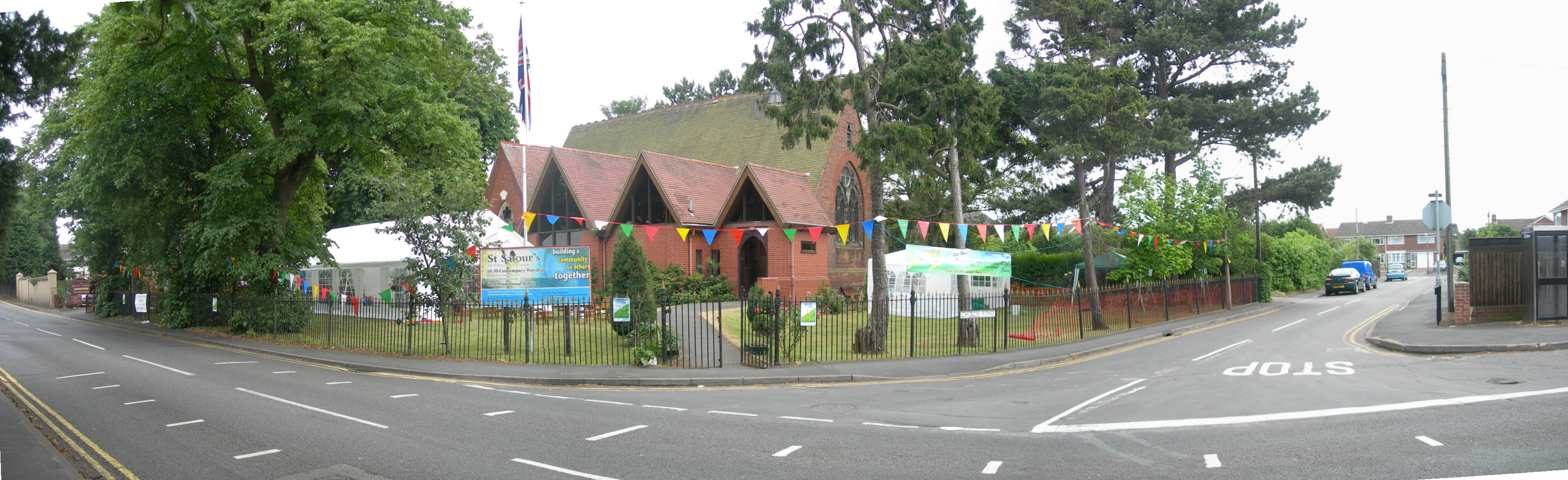
View of St Saviour's from Main Street, Branston

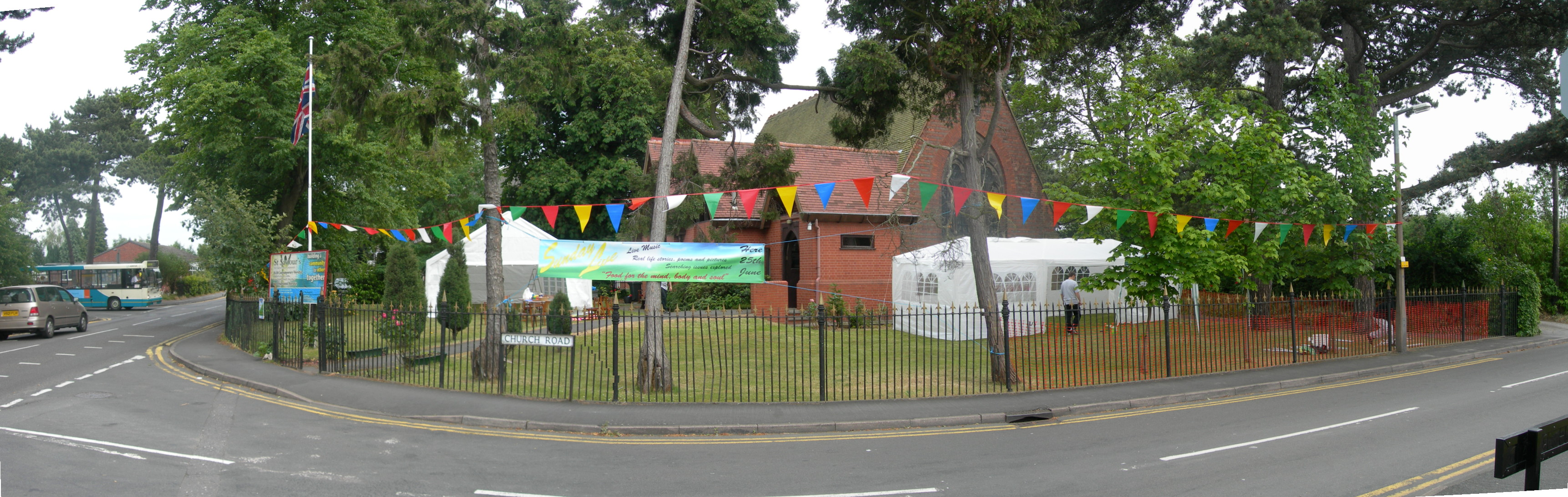
View of St Saviour's from Church Road, Branston
