= 2023 East Staffordshire Borough Council election =

2023 English local election

← 2019	4 May 2023	2027 →

All 37 seats to East Staffordshire Borough Council 19 seats needed for a majority

	First party	Second party
Leader	Mick Fitzpatrick	George Allen
Party	Labour	Conservative
Last election	10 seats, 38.7%	25 seats, 48.1%
Seats before	11	23
Seats won	21	15
Seat change	▲11	▼10
Popular vote	25,377	24,248
Percentage	45.1%	43.1%
Swing	▲6.4%	▼5.0%
	Third party	Fourth party
Party	Independent	Liberal Democrats
Last election	3 seats, 5.8%	1 seat, 3.3%
Seats before	4	1
Seats won	1	0
Seat change	▼2	▼1
Popular vote	4,378	n/a
Percentage	7.8%	n/a
Swing	▲2.0%	n/a
- Winner of each seat at the 2023 East Staffordshire Borough Council election
Leader before election
George Allen
Conservative
Leader after election
Mick Fitzpatrick
Labour

The 2023 East Staffordshire Borough Council election took place on 4 May 2023 to elect all 37 members of East Staffordshire Borough Council in Staffordshire, England. This was on the same day as other local elections across England. New ward boundaries took effect at this election, reducing the number of councillors from 39 to 37.

The council was under Conservative majority control prior to the election. Following the results, the Conservatives lost control of the council to Labour for the first time in 20 years. The Labour group leader, Mick Fitzpatrick, was appointed leader of the council at the subsequent annual council meeting on 26 May 2023.

== Overall results ==
2023 East Staffordshire Borough Council election
Party	Candidates	Seats	Gains	Losses	Net gain/loss	Seats %	Votes %	Votes	+/−
Labour	37	21	7	0	▲11	56.8	45.1	25,377	+6.4
Conservative	37	15	1	7	▼10	40.5	43.1	24,248	–5.0
Independent	14	1	0	1	▼2	2.7	7.8	4,378	+2.0
Green	9	0	0	0	Steady	0.0	3.6	2,044	+1.6
Reform UK	2	0	0	0	Steady	0.0	0.3	191	N/A

The Liberal Democrats also lost one seat, but are not shown in the above table as they did not stand any candidates at this election.

== Ward results ==
The results for each ward were:

=== Anglesey ===
Anglesey (2 seats)
Party	Candidate	Votes	%	±%
Labour	Syed Hussain*	910	76.7	–2.3
Labour	Ali Chaudhry*	729	61.4	–4.3
Conservative	Edward Barker	156	13.1	–1.6
Conservative	Andrew Hartshorn	134	11.3	–2.0
Green	Kimberley Raffle	123	10.4	N/A
Turnout		1,187	24.2	–6.6
Registered electors		4,908		
Labour hold				
Labour hold				

=== Bagots & Needwood ===
Bagots & Needwood (3 seats)
Party	Candidate	Votes	%	±%
Conservative	Beverley Ashcroft*	1,579	57.0	
Conservative	Jacqui Jones*	1,537	55.5	
Conservative	Vicki Gould*	1,519	54.8	
Labour	Yasmin Donlon	606	21.9	
Labour	Sharon Fox	565	20.4	
Green	Andy Barlow	493	17.8	
Labour	Stephen Fox	485	17.5	
Green	Tony Slater	463	16.7	
Independent	Edward Rodway-Bowden	299	10.8	
Turnout		2,771	33.7	
Registered electors		8,232		
Conservative win (new seat)				
Conservative win (new seat)				
Conservative win (new seat)				

=== Blythe ===
Blythe
Party	Candidate	Votes	%	±%
Independent	Colin Whittaker*	362	44.9	
Conservative	Nigel Lowe	275	34.1	
Labour	Karen Grant	117	14.5	
Green	Olly Ragg	53	6.6	
Majority		87	10.8	
Turnout		810	37.3	
Registered electors		2,174		
Independent win (new seat)				

=== Branston ===
Branston (3 seats)
Party	Candidate	Votes	%	±%
Labour	Mick Huckerby	771	41.2	+5.7
Labour	Arshad Afsar	742	39.7	+1.5
Conservative	Adam Clarke*	709	37.9	–14.1
Conservative	Patricia Ackroyd*	667	35.6	–18.8
Conservative	Ray Faulkner	659	35.2	–15.3
Labour	May Low	599	32.0	–2.1
Independent	Richard Grosvenor*	504	26.9	N/A
Green	Kelly Rickard	255	13.6	N/A
Turnout		1,871	26.3	–2.7
Registered electors		7,122		
Labour gain from Conservative				
Labour gain from Conservative				
Conservative hold				

=== Brizlincote ===
Brizlincote
Party	Candidate	Votes	%	±%
Conservative	Colin Wileman*	898	48.1	–7.4
Conservative	Bernard Peters*	818	43.8	–17.0
Labour	Jack Burrows	690	36.9	+12.1
Labour	Andrew Mason	622	33.3	+11.7
Independent	Becky Talbot	260	13.9	N/A
Reform UK	Tracy Sutcliffe	145	7.8	N/A
Independent	Walid Qneibi	115	6.2	N/A
Turnout		1,868	33.7	–2.1
Registered electors		5,539		
Conservative hold				
Conservative hold				

=== Burton & Eton ===
Burton & Eton (3 seats)
Party	Candidate	Votes	%	±%
Labour	Monica Holton	822	67.3	
Labour	Thomas Hadley	772	63.2	
Labour	Louise Walker	754	61.7	
Independent	John Anderson	312	25.5	
Conservative	Nicholas George	169	13.8	
Conservative	Charles George	163	13.3	
Conservative	Sally Sankey	154	12.6	
Turnout		1,222	19.0	
Registered electors		6,362		
Labour win (new seat)				
Labour win (new seat)				
Labour win (new seat)				

=== Crown ===
Crown
Party	Candidate	Votes	%	±%
Conservative	Philip Hudson*	387	41.0	
Independent	Robert Hardwick	307	32.5	
Labour	May Arthur	141	14.9	
Green	Sally Varley	63	6.7	
Reform UK	Paul Allen	46	4.9	
Majority		80	8.5	
Turnout		944	37.5	
Registered electors		2,515		
Conservative hold		Swing		

=== Dove ===
Dove (3 seats)
Party	Candidate	Votes	%	±%
Conservative	Chrys Smedley	1,253	51.4	
Conservative	Simon Gaskin*	1,244	51.1	
Conservative	Russell Lock	1,192	48.9	
Labour	Elaine Williams	1,001	41.1	
Labour	Dale Barr	993	40.8	
Labour	William Walker	962	39.5	
Turnout		2,436	31.4	
Registered electors		7,747		
Conservative win (new seat)				
Conservative win (new seat)				
Conservative win (new seat)				

=== Heath ===
Heath (3 seats)
Party	Candidate	Votes	%	±%
Labour	Rob Hawkins	983	53.5	+12.4
Labour	Zdzislaw Krupski	982	53.4	+14.8
Labour	Aaron Mansfield	918	49.9	N/A
Conservative	Mark Crutchley	754	41.0	N/A
Conservative	Chris Sylvester*	708	41.0	–13.5
Conservative	Duncan Goodfellow*	645	35.1	–13.6
Turnout		1,838	27.5	+1.0
Registered electors		6,670		
Labour gain from Conservative				
Labour gain from Conservative				
Labour win (new seat)				

=== Horninglow & Outwoods ===
Horninglow & Outwoods (3 seats)
Party	Candidate	Votes	%	±%
Labour	Michael Slater	914	49.7	
Labour	Mandy Shrive*	811	44.1	
Labour	Adriana Bailey	776	42.2	
Conservative	Jane Gaskin	563	30.6	
Conservative	Lee Clarke	457	24.9	
Independent	Deneice Florence-Jukes*	457	24.9	
Conservative	Marguerite Harrison	369	20.1	
Green	Deb Moyes	218	11.9	
Turnout		1,758	23.9	
Registered electors		7,355		
Labour win (new seat)				
Labour win (new seat)				
Labour win (new seat)				

=== Shobnall ===
Shobnall (2 seats)
Party	Candidate	Votes	%	±%
Labour	Shelagh McKiernan*	715	74.0	+23.6
Labour	Paul Walker*	714	73.9	+21.7
Conservative	Mike Newbold	173	17.9	–17.8
Conservative	Kathy Shaw	152	15.7	–12.6
Green	Simon Hales	110	11.4	–3.3
Turnout		966	19.7	–5.3
Registered electors		4,998		
Labour hold				
Labour hold				

=== Stapenhill ===
Stapenhill (2 seats)
Party	Candidate	Votes	%	±%
Labour	Alison Legg*	533	57.1	+13.4
Labour	Michael Fitzpatrick	508	54.4	+11.9
Conservative	Becky Brady*	304	32.5	–9.4
Conservative	Chris Rafaluk	226	24.2	–8.3
Independent	James Wright	152	16.3	N/A
Turnout		934	18.2	–2.8
Registered electors		5,122		
Labour hold				
Labour hold				

=== Stramshall & Weaver ===
Stramshall & Weaver (2 seats)
Party	Candidate	Votes	%	±%
Conservative	Steve Sankey	907	54.9	
Conservative	Laura Beech	788	47.7	
Labour	David Vaughan-Birch	404	24.4	
Labour	Madeleine Bounasser	351	21.2	
Green	Anna Williams-Westwood	266	16.1	
Independent	Malcom Barrett	228	13.8	
Turnout		1,653	35.7	
Registered electors		4,623		
Conservative win (new seat)				
Conservative win (new seat)				

=== Stretton ===
Stretton (3 seats)
Party	Candidate	Votes	%	±%
Conservative	Liz Bullock	1,158	55.1	+15.2
Conservative	Mike Ackroyd	889	42.3	+7.6
Labour	Simon Slater	791	37.6	+20.9
Conservative	Simon Hartland	731	34.8	+10.9
Labour	Ewan Parsons	650	30.9	+18.5
Labour	Robert Tolley	608	28.9	+18.2
Independent	Tracey Stretton	595	28.3	N/A
Turnout		2,102	28.1	–8.9
Registered electors		7,471		
Conservative gain from Independent				
Conservative hold				
Labour gain from Conservative				

=== Town ===
Town (2 seats)
Party	Candidate	Votes	%	±%
Labour	Penelope Krupski	580	43.6	+1.2
Conservative	George Allen*	436	32.8	–18.2
Conservative	Susan McGarry*	426	32.1	–20.7
Labour	John McKiernan	412	31.0	–3.9
Independent	Wendy Harrogate	311	23.4	N/A
Independent	David Brookes	250	18.8	N/A
Turnout		1,329	33.1	+4.6
Registered electors		4,011		
Labour gain from Conservative				
Conservative hold				

=== Winshill ===
Winshill (2 seats)
Party	Candidate	Votes	%	±%
Labour	Kim Smith	726	48.6	+12.9
Labour	Dennis Fletcher*	720	48.2	+8.0
Conservative	Mike Metcalfe*	552	36.9	–1.9
Conservative	Kieran Bahia-Dhesi	497	33.3	–8.7
Independent	Richard Jukes	226	15.1	N/A
Turnout		1,494	27.4	–2.9
Registered electors		5,431		
Labour gain from Conservative				
Labour hold				

== Changes 2023-2027 ==
=== By-elections ===
Stretton: 26 September 2024
Party	Candidate	Votes	%	±%
Conservative	Gerry Holmes	1,012	70.8	+25.3
Labour	John McKiernan	304	21.3	–9.8
Green	Kelly Rickard	113	7.9	N/A
Majority		708	49.5	N/A
Turnout		1,433	19.3	–8.8
Registered electors		7,443		
Conservative hold		Swing	▲17.6	

By-election trigged by the death of Conservative councillor Mike Ackroyd.
