= 1 Regiment RLC =

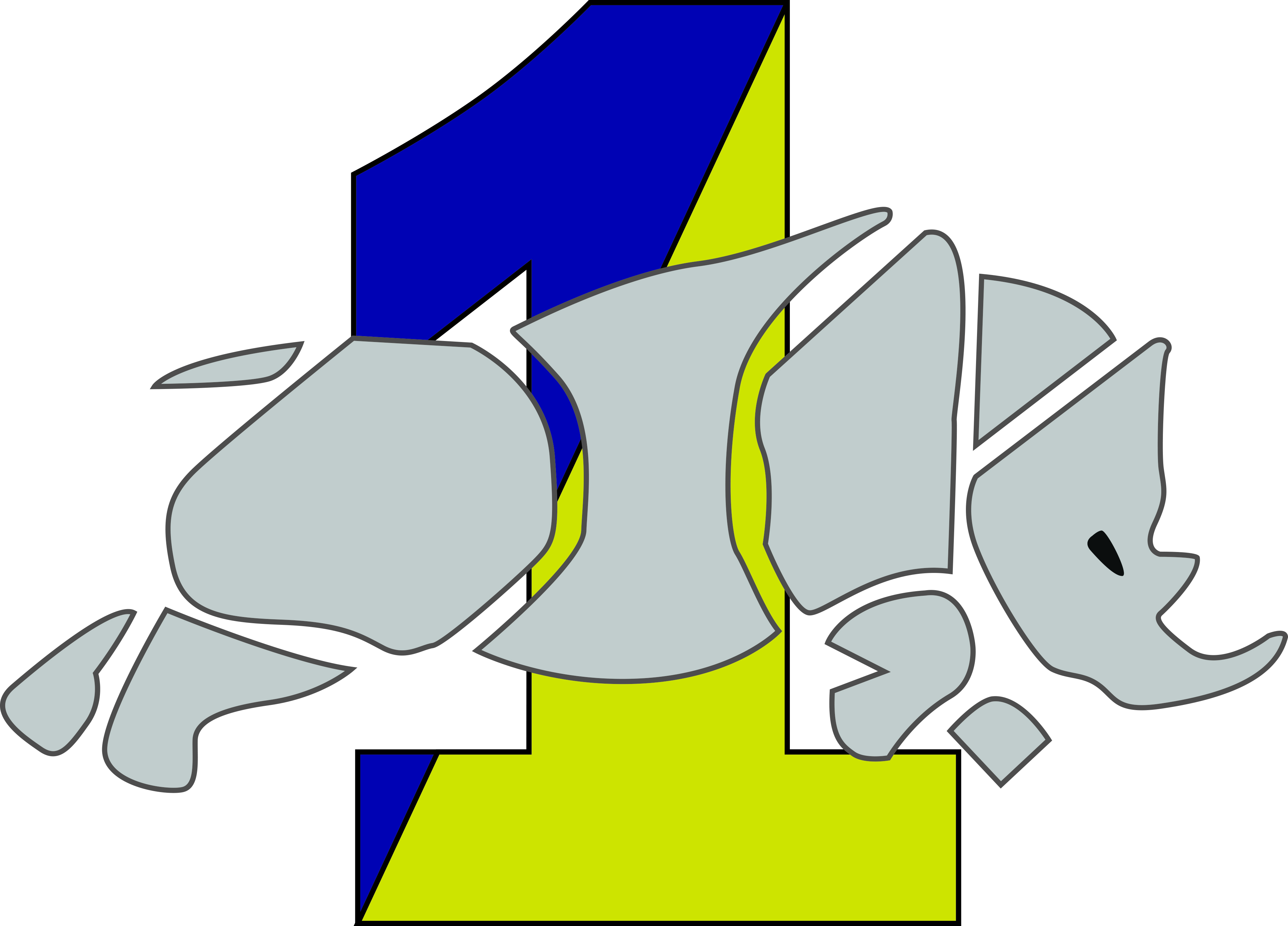
- Active: 1812-present
- Country: United Kingdom
- Branch: British Army
- Type: Regiment
- Role: Close Support Logistics
- Size: Regiment; 543 personnel
- Part of: Royal Logistic Corps
- Garrison/HQ: MoD Bicester
- Website: 1 Regt RLC

1 Regiment RLC is a regiment of the British Army's Royal Logistic Corps.

== History ==
The regiment was formed in 1812 and has participated in many conflicts such the Second World War and operations in Northern Ireland, Iraq and Afghanistan. After being known as 1 Divisional Column for many years, it became 1 Armoured Division Transport Regiment RCT in December 1977, 1 General Support Regiment RLC in April 1993 and 1 Regiment RLC in 2014. It moved from Gütersloh in Germany to St David's Barracks at MoD Bicester in 2016.

== Organisation ==
The regiment currently has several units within it:

- 74 Headquarters Squadron
- 2 Close Support Squadron
- 12 Close Support Squadron
- 23 General Support Squadron
- Regimental Light Aid Detachment, Royal Electrical and Mechanical Engineers.

It is partnered with 157 (Welsh) Regiment RLC in the UK.
