= 2019 East Staffordshire Borough Council election =

2019 UK local government election

- 2 May 2019

All 39 seats to East Staffordshire Borough Council 20 seats needed for a majority

	First party	Second party
Party	Conservative	Labour
Last election	25 seats, 48.9%	12 seats, 36.9%
Seats won	25	10
Seat change	Steady	▼2
Popular vote	22,293	17,923
Percentage	48.1%	38.7%
Swing	▼0.7%	▲1.8%
	Third party	Fourth party
Party	Independent	Liberal Democrats
Last election	N/A	1 seat, 0.6%
Seats won	3	1
Seat change	▲3	Steady
Popular vote	2,673	1,534
Percentage	5.8%	3.3%
Swing	N/A	▲2.7%
- Results of the 2019 East Staffordshire Borough Council election
Council control before election
Conservative
Council control after election
Conservative

The 2019 East Staffordshire Borough Council election took place on 2 May 2019 to elect members of the East Staffordshire Borough Council in England. It was held on the same day as other local elections.

== Summary ==
=== Election result ===
2019 East Staffordshire Borough Council election
Party	Candidates	Seats	Gains	Losses	Net gain/loss	Seats %	Votes %	Votes	+/−
Conservative	39	25	1	1	Steady	64.1	48.1	22,293	–0.7
Labour	36	10	0	2	▼2	25.6	38.7	17,923	+1.8
Independent	4	3	3	0	▲3	7.7	5.8	2,673	N/A
Liberal Democrats	6	1	0	0	Steady	2.6	3.3	1,534	+2.7
UKIP	3	0	0	1	▼1	0.0	2.2	1,020	–9.1
Green	4	0	0	0	Steady	0.0	2.0	926	–0.4

== Ward results ==
=== Abbey ===
Abbey
Party	Candidate	Votes	%	±%
Conservative	Colin Whittaker	Unopposed		
Turnout				
Conservative hold				

=== Anglesey ===
Anglesey
Party	Candidate	Votes	%	±%
Labour	Syed Hussain	1,082	79.0	
Labour	Ali Chaudhry	900	65.7	
Conservative	Aaron Bell	201	14.7	
Conservative	Liam Sperrin	182	13.3	
Turnout		1,370	30.8	
Labour hold				
Labour hold				

=== Bagots ===
Bagots
Party	Candidate	Votes	%	±%
Conservative	Greg Hall	Unopposed		
Turnout				
Conservative hold		Swing		

=== Branston ===
Branston
Party	Candidate	Votes	%	±%
Conservative	Patricia Ackroyd	927	54.4	
Conservative	Adam Clarke	886	52.0	
Conservative	Richard Grosvenor	861	50.5	
Labour	Arshad Afsar	652	38.2	
Labour	Mick Huckbury	606	35.5	
Labour	Sajid Rashid	581	34.1	
Turnout		1,705	29.0	
Conservative hold				
Conservative hold				
Conservative hold				

=== Brizlincote ===
Brizlincote
Party	Candidate	Votes	%	±%
Conservative	Bernard Peters	898	60.8	
Conservative	Colin Wileman	821	55.5	
Labour	Tom Hadley	366	24.8	
Labour	William Walker	319	21.6	
Green	Carol Sharratt	276	18.7	
Turnout		1,478	35.8	
Conservative hold				
Conservative hold				

=== Burton ===
Burton
Party	Candidate	Votes	%	±%
Liberal Democrats	Helen Hall	339	57.0	
Labour	Jami Shrive	176	29.6	
Conservative	Conor Wileman	80	13.4	
Majority				
Turnout		606		
Liberal Democrats hold		Swing		

=== Churnet ===
Churnet
Party	Candidate	Votes	%	±%
Conservative	Steve Sankey	428	57.8	
Labour	David Vaughan-Birch	175	23.6	
Independent	Chris Smith	137	18.5	
Majority				
Turnout		740	35.2	
Conservative hold		Swing		

=== Crown ===
Crown
Party	Candidate	Votes	%	±%
Conservative	Philip Hudson	602	82.7	
Labour	Cristina Parker	126	17.3	
Majority				
Turnout		770	37.0	
Conservative hold		Swing		

=== Eton Park ===
Eton Park
Party	Candidate	Votes	%	±%
Labour	Sonia Andjelkovic	569	44.7	
Independent	Dale Spedding	519	40.7	
Labour	Louise Walker	500	39.2	
UKIP	Peter Levis	226	17.7	
Conservative	Jack Gould	171	13.4	
Conservative	Philip White	127	10.0	
Liberal Democrats	Hugh Warner	60	4.7	
Turnout		1,274	27.0	
Labour hold				
Independent gain from Labour				

=== Heath ===
Heath
Party	Candidate	Votes	%	±%
Conservative	Chris Sylvester	671	52.0	
Conservative	Duncan Goodfellow	628	48.7	
Labour	Jo Cane	530	41.1	
Labour	Zdzislaw Krupski	498	38.6	
Turnout		1,290	26.5	
Conservative hold				
Conservative hold				

=== Horninglow ===
Horninglow
Party	Candidate	Votes	%	±%
Labour	Ken Builth	672	44.5	
Independent	Deneice Florence-Jukes	628	41.6	
Labour	Mandy Shrive	621	41.1	
Labour	Bob Johnston	540	35.8	
Conservative	Mike Ackroyd	428	28.3	
Conservative	Ishrat Abbasi	304	20.1	
Conservative	Georgina Graham	293	19.4	
Turnout		1,510	24	
Labour hold				
Independent gain from Labour				
Labour hold				

=== Needwood ===
Needwood
Party	Candidate	Votes	%	±%
Conservative	Jacqui Jones	1,010	59.4	
Conservative	Bev Ashcroft	838	49.3	
Liberal Democrats	Derek Lord	509	30.0	
Labour	Michael Baker	335	19.7	
UKIP	Luke Norman	240	14.1	
Turnout		1,699	36.2	
Conservative hold				
Conservative hold				

=== Rolleston-on-Dove ===
Rolleston-on-Dove
Party	Candidate	Votes	%	±%
Conservative	Beryl Toon	779	71.3	
Labour	Ron Clarke	313	28.7	
Turnout		1,119	41.9	
Conservative hold		Swing		

=== Shobnall ===
Shobnall
Party	Candidate	Votes	%	±%
Labour	Paul Walker	695	52.2	
Labour	Shelagh Mckiernan	671	50.4	
Conservative	Hamid Asghar	475	35.7	
Conservative	Maqsood Hussain	377	28.3	
Green	Simon Hales	196	14.7	
Turnout		1,332	25.0	
Labour hold				
Labour hold				

=== Stapenhill ===
Stapenhill
Party	Candidate	Votes	%	±%
Labour	Alison Legg	534	43.7	
Labour	Michael Fitzpatrick	519	42.5	
Conservative	Becky Brady	511	41.9	
Labour	Craig Jones	401	32.8	
Conservative	Lynda Peters	397	32.5	
Conservative	Helen Smart	369	30.2	
Green	Robert Sharratt	246	20.1	
Turnout		1,221	21.0	
Labour hold				
Labour hold				
Conservative gain from UKIP				

=== Stretton ===
Stretton
Party	Candidate	Votes	%	±%
Independent	Graham Lamb	1,389	61.5	
Conservative	Vicki Gould	902	39.9	
Conservative	Julie Killoran	784	34.7	
UKIP	Brain Buxton	554	24.5	
Conservative	Shruti Purandare	540	23.9	
Labour	Michael Slater	377	16.7	
Labour	May Low	280	12.4	
Labour	Martin Partridge	241	10.7	
Turnout		2,258	37.0	
Independent gain from Conservative				
Conservative hold				
Conservative hold				

=== Town ===
Town
Party	Candidate	Votes	%	±%
Conservative	Sue McGarry	787	52.8	
Conservative	George Allen	761	51.0	
Labour	Dave Trenery	632	42.4	
Labour	John Mckiernan	521	34.9	
Turnout		1,491	28.5	
Conservative hold				
Conservative hold				

=== Tutbury and Outwoods ===
Tutbury and Outwoods
Party	Candidate	Votes	%	±%
Conservative	Simon Gaskin	935	55.6	
Conservative	Gary Raybould	856	50.9	
Labour	John Anderson	683	40.6	
Labour	Lewis Anderson	627	37.3	
Turnout		1,683	32.2	
Conservative hold				
Conservative hold				

=== Weaver ===
Weaver
Party	Candidate	Votes	%	±%
Conservative	Edward Barker	525	79.4	
Labour	Pat Slater	136	20.6	
Majority				
Turnout			42.0	
Conservative hold		Swing		

=== Winshill ===
Winshill
Party	Candidate	Votes	%	±%
Conservative	Ray Faulkner	789	42.0	
Labour	Dennis Fletcher	756	40.2	
Conservative	Mike Metcalfe	730	38.8	
Conservative	Mathew Webb	714	38.0	
Labour	Kim Smith	671	35.7	
Labour	Philippa Saddington	517	27.5	
Liberal Democrats	Robert Coates	239	12.7	
Liberal Democrats	Sam Goldsworthy	214	11.4	
Green	Dena Rapley	208	11.1	
Liberal Democrats	Theo Hollier	173	9.2	
Turnout		1,880	30.3	
Conservative hold				
Labour hold				
Conservative hold				

=== Yoxall ===
Yoxall
Party	Candidate	Votes	%	±%
Conservative	Alan Johnson	706	87.5	
Labour	Dale Barr	101	12.5	
Turnout			37.5	
Conservative hold		Swing		

== By-elections ==
=== Eaton Park ===
Eaton Park By-Election 6 May 2021
Party	Candidate	Votes	%	±%
Conservative	Michael Ackroyd			
Liberal Democrats	Sam Goldsworthy			
Conservative	Jack Gould			
Labour	Thomas Hadley			
Labour	Louise Walker			
Liberal Democrats	Hugh Warner			
Majority				
Turnout				

=== Tutbury & Outwoods ===
Tutbury & Outwoods: 30 September 2021
Party	Candidate	Votes	%	±%
Conservative	Russell Lock	549	44.3	−13.4
Independent	John Anderson	464	37.5	N/A
Labour	Dale Barr	186	15.0	−27.2
Green	Lynn Furber	39	3.2	N/A
Majority		85	6.8	
Turnout		1,240	22.3	
Conservative hold		Swing	▼25.5	
