= Paget High School =

Location
- Burton Road; Branston, Staffordshire, DE14 3DR; England
- 52.78652°N 1.65819°W

Information
- Type: Community school
- Local authority: Staffordshire
- Department for Education URN: 124392 Tables
- Ofsted: Reports
- Head teacher: Lewis Fenn Griffin
- Gender: Mixed
- Age: 11 to 18
- Enrolment: 771 (April 2022)
- Website: paget.staffs.sch.uk

Paget High School is a mixed secondary school and sixth form located in Branston in the English county of Staffordshire.

It is a community school administered by Staffordshire County Council. Paget High School offers GCSEs, BTECs and Cambridge Technicals as programmes of study for pupils, while students in the sixth form have the option to study from a range of A-levels and further BTECs.

The school also operates a school farm on its grounds, and since 2008 has established a community orchard that provides fruit to the surrounding community. The farm has: rabbits, guinea pigs, chickens, turkeys, ferrets, sheep and goats.
