= Nether Stowe School =

Location
- St Chad's Road; Lichfield, Staffordshire, WS13 7NB; England; 52°41′27″N 1°49′26″W

Information
- Type: Academy
- Motto: Aspire to Excellence
- Established: 1964
- Local authority: Staffordshire County Council
- Trust: The Arthur Terry Learning Partnership
- Department for Education URN: 146493 Tables
- Ofsted: Reports
- Head teacher: Marie George (Acting Headteacher)
- Gender: Mixed
- Age range: 11–18
- Capacity: 929
- Houses: Chase; Trent; Wall; Beacon
- Colours: Green; Red; Yellow; Blue
- Website: www.netherstowe.com

Nether Stowe School is an 11–18 mixed secondary school and sixth form with academy status in Lichfield, Staffordshire, England. It was established in 1964.

== History ==
Nether Stowe High School replaced Lichfield Central School in 1964, with the first 350 students being transferred upon its closure. It was substantially expanded in 1969.

== Awards and achievements ==
As of 2008, the school has achieved a Maths & Computing College status. The school also received an Artsmark reward; a school achievement award, and a Sportsmark award - all of which were awarded in 2001. In 2003, the school gained 'Investors In People' status and a 'School Extra' award.

The 2013 OFSTED report has shown that the school now places under the 'good' category, having moved up from 'satisfactory', with inspectors citing that the use of peer marking in lessons, carefully planned teaching and reading initiatives and good relationships between staff and pupils have increased attainment substantially. Students stated that they feel 'very safe' and the pupil premium that is being utilised has had a great benefit on those involved. Also noted was that some lessons were 'outstanding' and that the school only has a few basic steps to take before becoming an outstanding school. The full report can be viewed on the school website at

== Motto ==
The current motto for the school is 'Aspire to Excellence'. Previously, it had been 'Altiora Peto', translated from Latin as 'Aim Higher'. The old motto is still visible on the school uniform and School Seal, shown in many areas around the school.

== Houses ==
Currently, the school runs a "college" system. Students are split into the four colleges: Beacon, Chase, Wall and Trent. The colleges are named after places in the local area.

The school once had various 'houses' in which competitions are played. This increases both competitiveness and extra education, as well as being a fun activity too. Usually, one is held in every term. The houses involved are Trent(Green), Chase(Red), Beacon(Yellow) and Wall(Blue). Up until 2009, there was a fifth house - Brunel, representing Isambard Kingdom Brunel.

Early "House" names were after famous names, Sir Humphrey Gilbert, Sir Francis Drake, Sir Philip Sydney and Sir Richard Grenville and their colours were blue, red, green and yellow respectively. There were 6 houses initially along with those four and they were Raleigh - Purple and Frobisher - White. At the end of the 1980s there were two registration form classes per year belonging to each house. Form class designations were year/house/number. 5G2 would designate 5th year, Gilbert house, 2nd form room. 3Gr1, 3rd year, Grenville house, 1st form room.

The school abolished the form of 'house points' in 2010, in favour of a 'Credits & Debits' system, whereby credits are awarded for good behaviour and achievement, and debits are incurred for bad behaviour.

== Improvements ==
From 2019, the school has undertaken extensive refurbishment and development. This resulted in the creation of an extension to the front of school, housing the main reception as well as two classrooms and a brand new science laboratory. The work also entailed the refurbishment of existing classrooms, resulting in five new classrooms.

The new Nether Stowe Sports full-sized Hall was completed in 2020 to complement the existing inside space and swimming pool.

Further development work is scheduled for 2022 and 2023

== Facilities ==
In addition, the school leases its facilities to the community. A brand new and extensive Sports Hall was completed in 2020 for school and community use. Many clubs and organisations use the school facilities in the evening and at weekends.

== Controversy ==
According to an OFSTED inspection from 2004, the school, at the time, was notable for its failure to recruit suitable experienced staff members for long periods of time. In the same report, it was noted that the students of the time had a bad attitude to learning, and that teaching staff failed to control classes - thus, results were being affected badly. As a consequence, the school was put under special measures. This measure was lifted towards the end of 2005.

In 2007, the school came under scrutiny when incumbent headteacher Barrie Cooper announced to install CCTV cameras in the main toilets to quell the effects of problematic pupils - at the time, poor behaviour was rife. Although some students cited this as a good idea to cut down on violent incidents and gang gatherings, many felt that it was an invasion of privacy and that impressionable children may think that it is acceptable.

The cameras, as of June 2024, are still in both toilets, and functional. As of September 2023, the school has also added locks onto the toilets, meaning that toilets can only be accessed when unlocked, at break and lunch, which caused backlash on social media.

== List Of Headteachers ==
- 1966 to 1970 - Mr. C. L. Bower
- 1970 to 1975 - Mr. A. N. T. Winckler
- 1975 to 1976 - Mr. A. K. Chatwood
- 1976 to 1980 - Mr Peter Davies
- 1980 to 1991 - Mrs Gina Butler
- 1991 to 1999 - Mr. D. L. Binnie
- 1999 to 2004 - Ms. J Ward
- 2004 to 2008 - Mr. B Cooper
- 2008 to 2009 - Mr. J McElroy (Acting Headteacher)
- 2009 to 2018 - Ms. R Poppleton
- 2018 to 2024 - Mr. G Langston-Jones
- 2024 to 2025 - Mrs M. George (Acting Headteacher)
- 2025 to Present - Mrs K. Jones
