= MOD Bicester =

Military installation in Oxfordshire, England

- Bicester, Oxfordshire in England
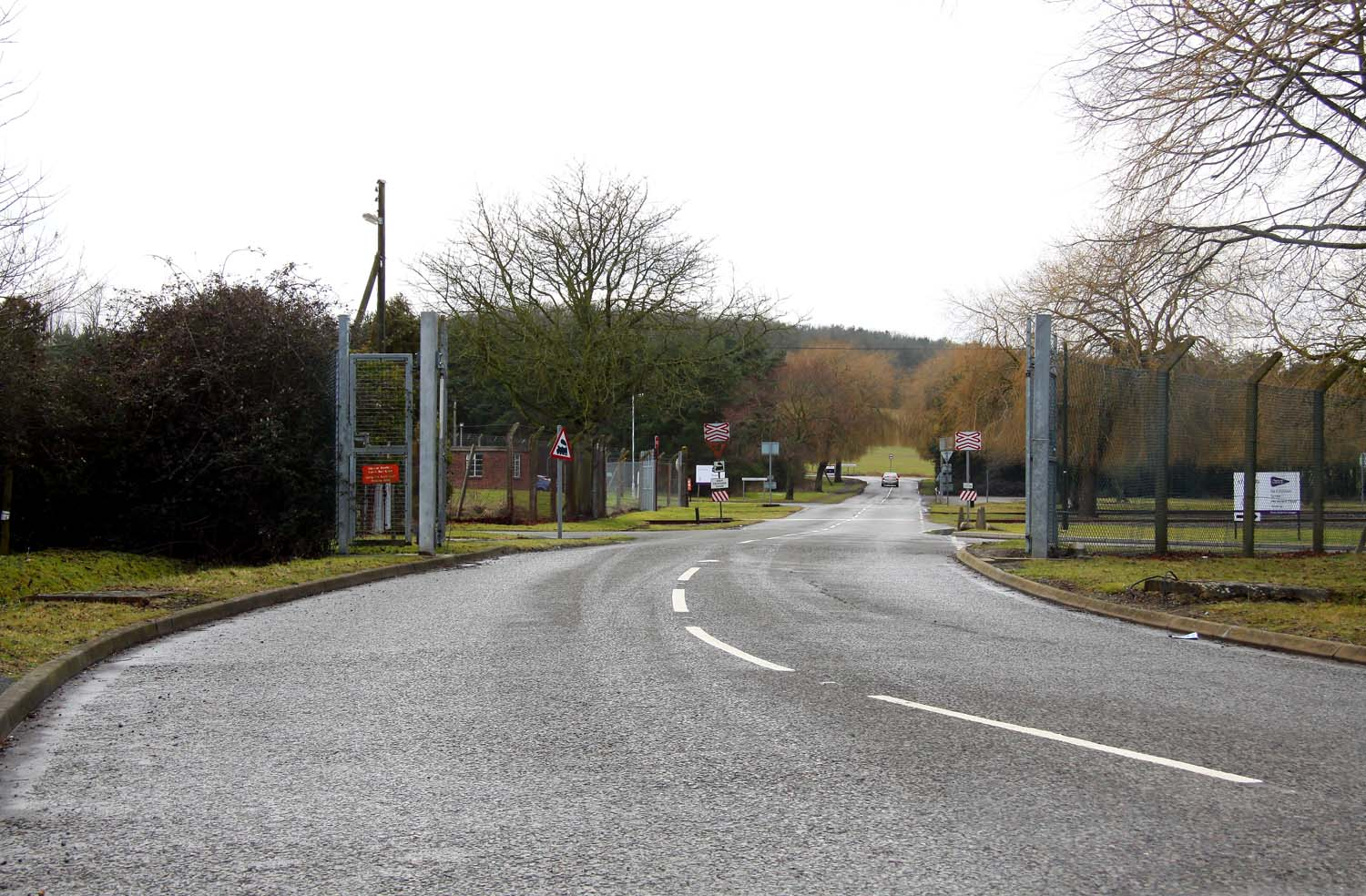
- Entrance at DE&S Bicester in 2010

Site information
- Type: Storage and Distribution Centre; Barracks
- Owner: Ministry of Defence
- Open to the public: No

Location
- MOD Bicester within Oxfordshire
- Location within Oxfordshire
- Coordinates: 51.87881°N 1.14682°W

Site history
- Built: 1942
- In use: 1942–Present

Garrison information
- Occupants: 1 Regiment RLC

MOD Bicester is a large military installation consisting of two barracks and a storage and distribution centre, just outside Bicester in Oxfordshire. The St David's Barracks part of the base, home to 1 Regiment RLC, is set to close in 2028. In 2026 "Site A" at the base was proposed as an accommodation centre for asylum seekers. In November 2026, the government granted planning permission for the base's conversion, with the nearby village of Piddington announcing that they will be launching a legal challenge against the decision.

== History ==
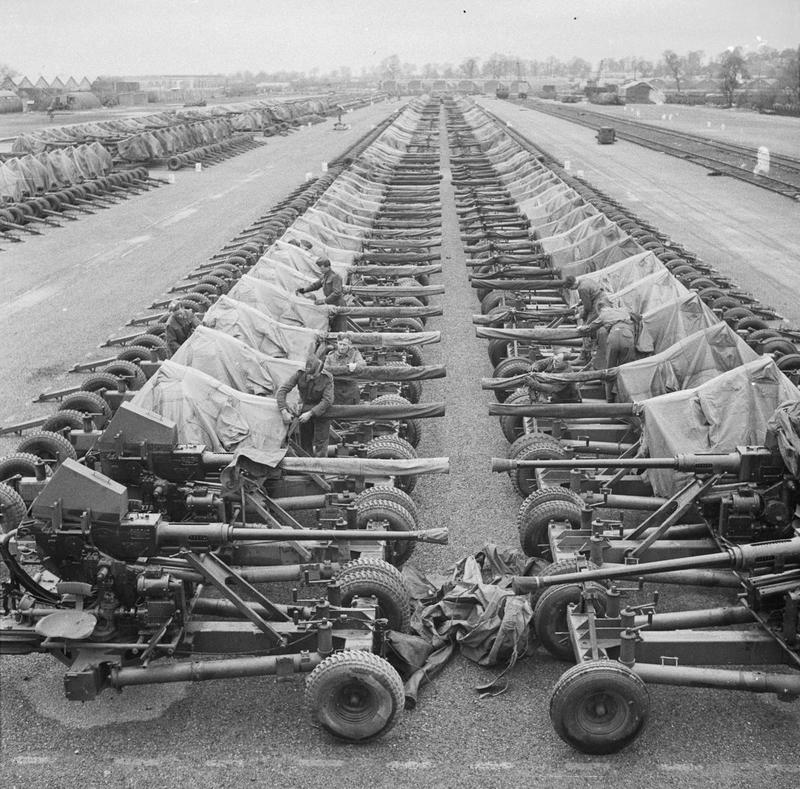
COD Bicester prior to D-Day, 1944.

The site dates back to September 1942, when a depot was constructed near Bicester to provide logistical support for operations in Europe during the Second World War. In 1961 the ordnance depots at Didcot and Branston were closed and a Central Ordnance Depot was created at Bicester. Between 1980 and 1982, the ordnance depots at Chilwell and Ruddington were also closed, resulting in an increased role for the remaining central ordnance depots at Bicester and Donnington. The depot became known as the Defence Storage and Distribution Centre in April 1999. The base is serviced by the Bicester Military Railway.

A bomb disposal training base, built at a cost of circa £100 million and including a cave complex, a dive pool and roadways was established at St George's Barracks on the site in March 2013.

In September 2014, 23 Pioneer Regiment, which had been based at St David's Barracks on the site since the 1940s, was disbanded. In 2016 1 Regiment RLC moved from Gütersloh in Germany to St David's Barracks.

== Current units ==
Units based at the site include:

St David’s Barracks

Royal Logistic Corps

- 1 Regiment
  - 74 Headquarters Squadron
  - 23 General Support Squadron
  - 12 Close Support Squadron
  - 2 Close Support Squadron
  - REME Light Aid Detachment

St George’s Barracks

Royal Engineers

- Defence Explosive Ordnance Disposal (EOD), Munitions, and Search (DEMS) Training Regiment

== Future ==
In 2002 the St David's Barracks portion of the site was earmarked for disposal, with a proposed closure date of 2028.

On 2 September 2026, the government made an Urgent Crown Development application to fast-track plans for 1,256 asylum seekers (all single men aged 18 to 65) to be relocated to "Site A" at the base. The military base, when operational, had accommodated around 2,600 personnel, 1,100 service personnel alongside roughly 1,500 civilian workers.

On 16 September 2026, in response to the urgent government application, residents of the nearby village symbolically renamed their village the Principality of Piddington; this action followed their unofficial referendum that they had voted in, the previous day, to secede from the UK by a majority of 285 votes to 26. A similar scheme was abandoned in 2007. In November 2026, planning permission for the base's conversion was granted by the Housing Secretary Angela Rayner. In an interview with BBC News, the Chair of the Parish Council of Piddington Tim McNally, responded to the decision by announcing that the village will be launching a legal challenge against it.

== See also ==
- MoD Donnington
