= East Staffordshire =

Coordinates: 52.8080°N 1.6457°W

East Staffordshire Borough
- Non-metropolitan district and Borough
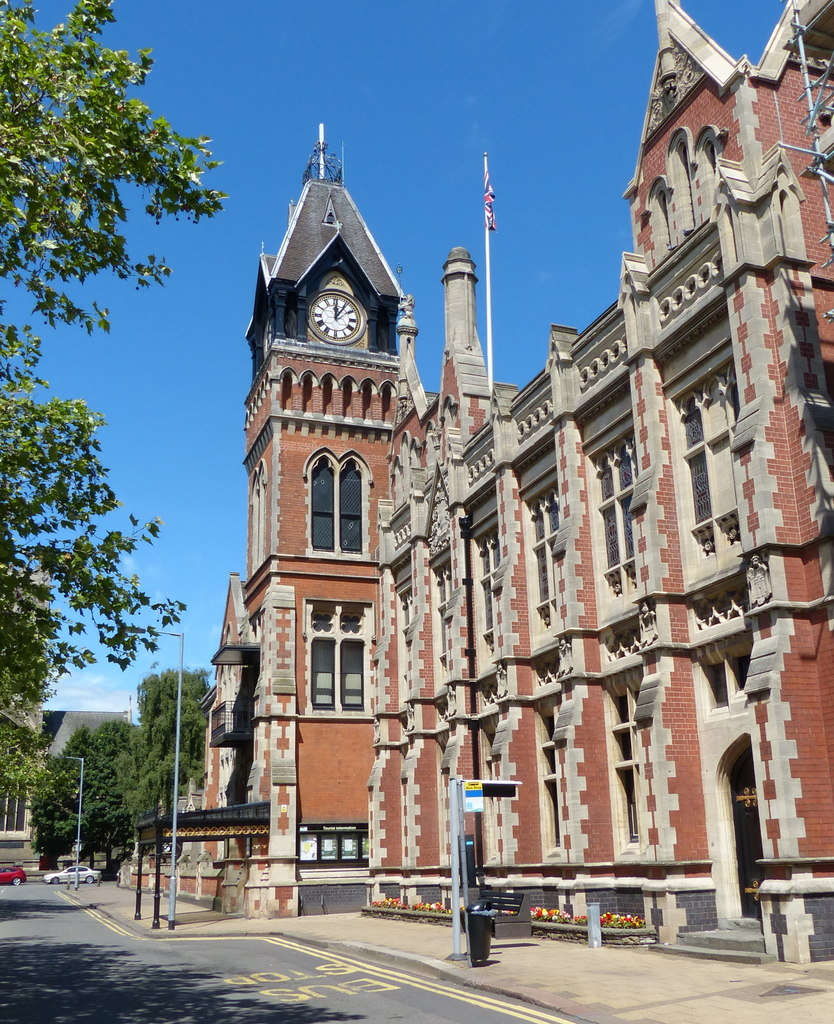
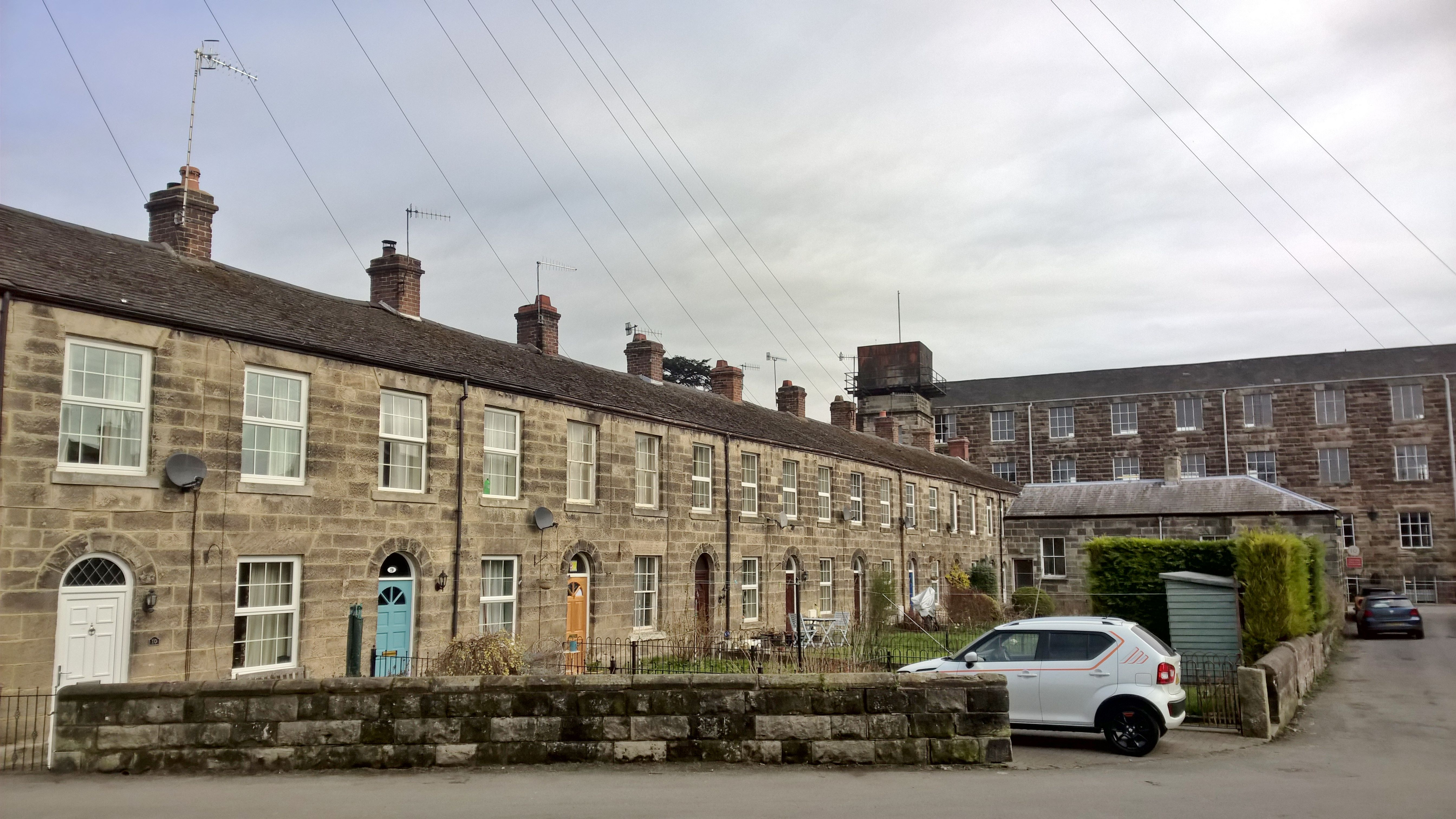
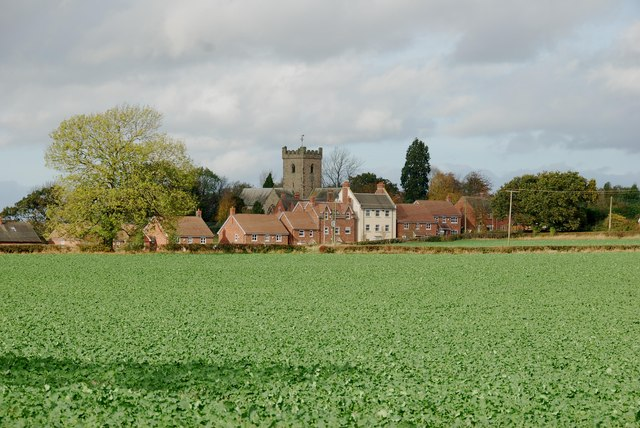
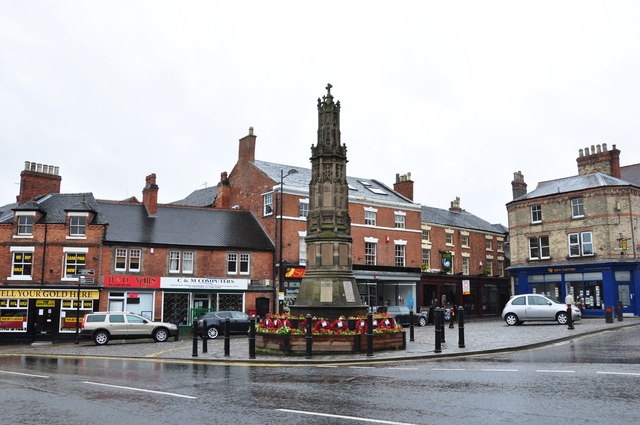
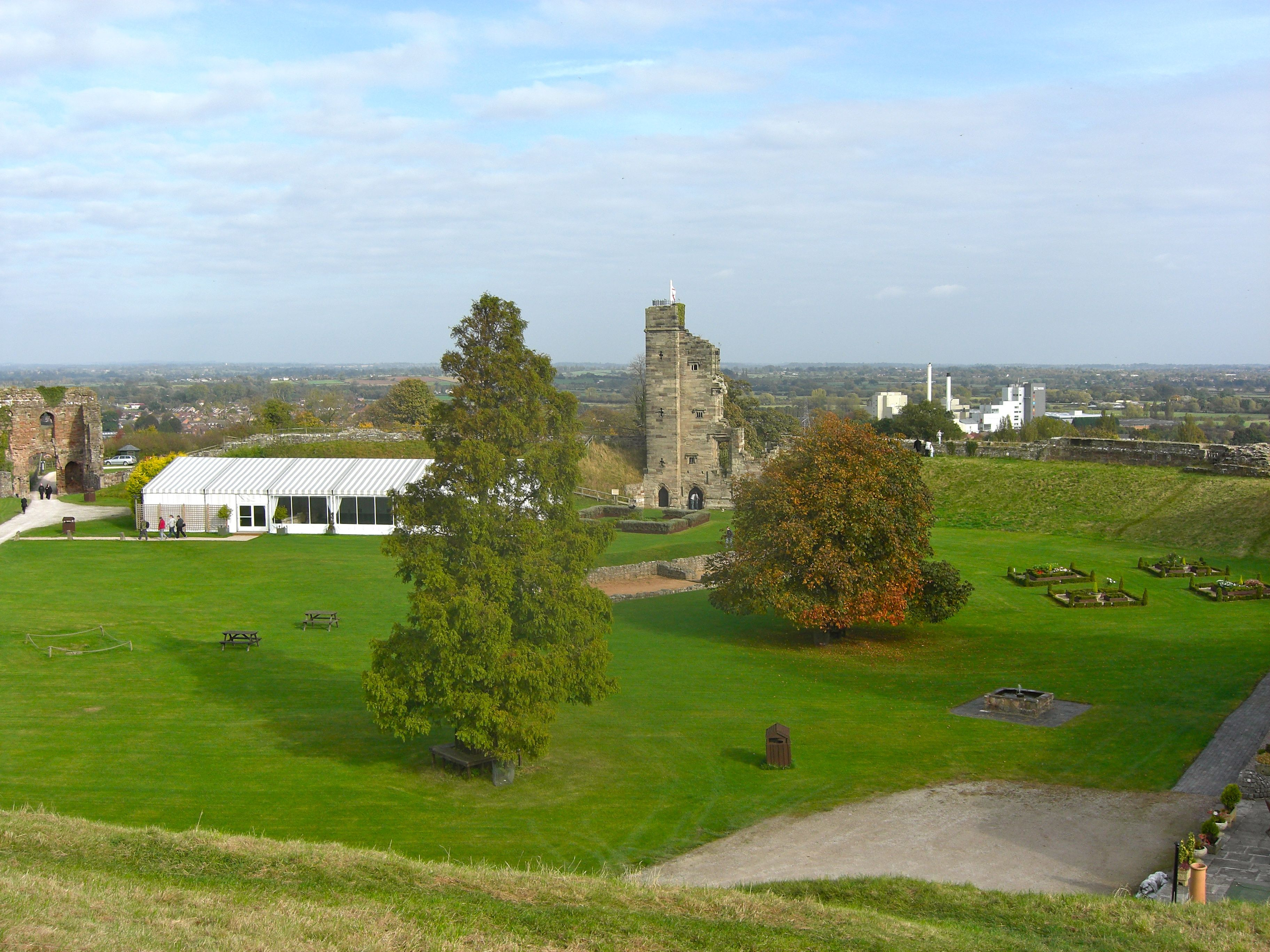
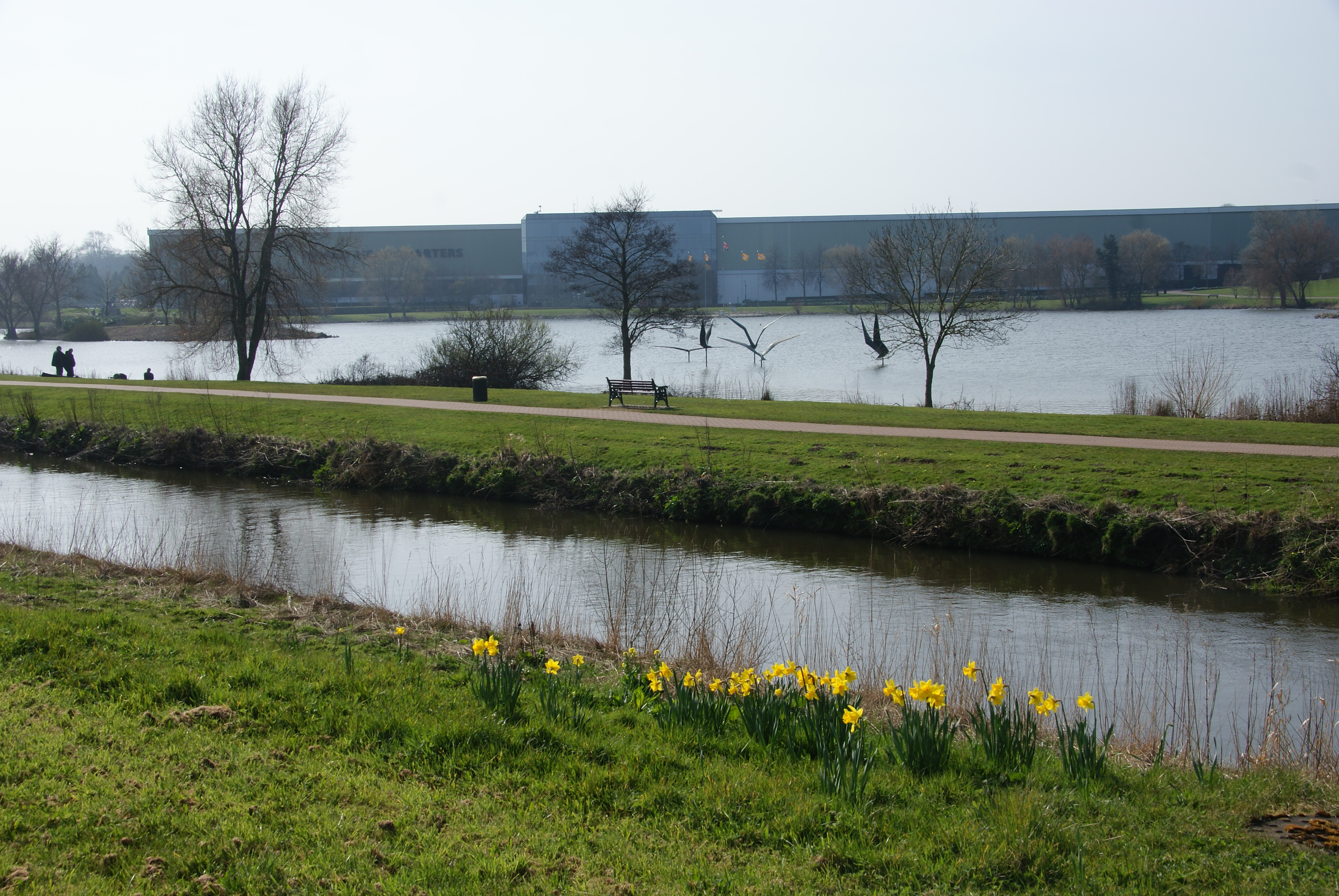
- From left to right; Top: Burton on Trent Town Hall and Church Mayfield; Middle: Church Leigh and Uttoxeter War Memorial; Bottom: Tutbury Castle and the JCB Headquarters in Rocester

- East Staffordshire shown within Staffordshire
- Sovereign state: United Kingdom
- Constituent country: England
- Region: West Midlands
- Non-metropolitan county: Staffordshire
- Status: Non-metropolitan district
- Admin HQ: Burton upon Trent
- Incorporated: 1 April 1974

Government
  - Type: Non-metropolitan district council
  - Body: East Staffordshire Borough Council
  - MPs: Jacob Collier, Dave Robertson

Area
  - Total: 150.6 sq mi (390.0 km^{2})
  - Rank: 88th (of 296)

Population (2025)
  - Total: 131,541
  - Rank: 187th (of 296)
  - Density: 873.6/sq mi (337.3/km^{2})

Ethnicity (2021)
  - Ethnic groups: List: 86.3% White; 9.3% Asian; 2.2% Mixed; 1.1% Black; 1.1% other

Religion (2021)
  - Religion: List: 50.4% Christianity; 33.9% no religion; 8.7% Islam; 0.3% Hinduism; 0.1% Judaism; 0.3% Sikhism; 0.3% Buddhism; 0.4% other; 5.6% not stated
- Time zone: UTC0 (GMT)
  - Summer (DST): UTC+1 (BST)
- ONS code: 41UC (ONS); E07000193 (GSS)
- OS grid reference: SK2388023478

East Staffordshire is a local government district with borough status in Staffordshire, England. The council is based in Burton upon Trent. The borough also contains the town of Uttoxeter and numerous villages and surrounding rural areas.

The neighbouring districts are Lichfield, Stafford, Staffordshire Moorlands, Derbyshire Dales and South Derbyshire.

== History ==
The district was created on 1 April 1974 under the Local Government Act 1972 covering four former districts, which were all abolished at the same time:

- Burton upon Trent County Borough
- Tutbury Rural District
- Uttoxeter Rural District
- Uttoxeter Urban District

The new district was named East Staffordshire, reflecting its position within the wider county. The district received borough status in 1992, allowing the chair of the council to take the title of mayor.

Since 2011, East Staffordshire Borough Council has been a member of the Greater Birmingham & Solihull Local Enterprise Partnership. In 2020, East Staffordshire also joined the Stoke and Staffordshire Local Enterprise Partnership.

== Abolition ==
Under current local government reorganisation plans, all district councils in Staffordshire, as well as the county council, will be abolished in 2028, with the district forming part of a new South and Mid Staffordshire unitary authority.

== Governance ==
East Staffordshire Borough Council

Type
- Type: Non-metropolitan district

Leadership
- Mayor: Monica Holton, Labour since 15 May 2026
- Leader: Mick Fitzpatrick, Labour since 26 May 2023
- Chief Executive: Andy O'Brien since 2009

Structure
- Seats: 37 councillors
- Political groups: Administration (21) Labour (21) Other parties (16) Conservative (15) Independent (1)

Elections
- Voting system: First past the post
- Last election: 4 May 2023

Meeting place
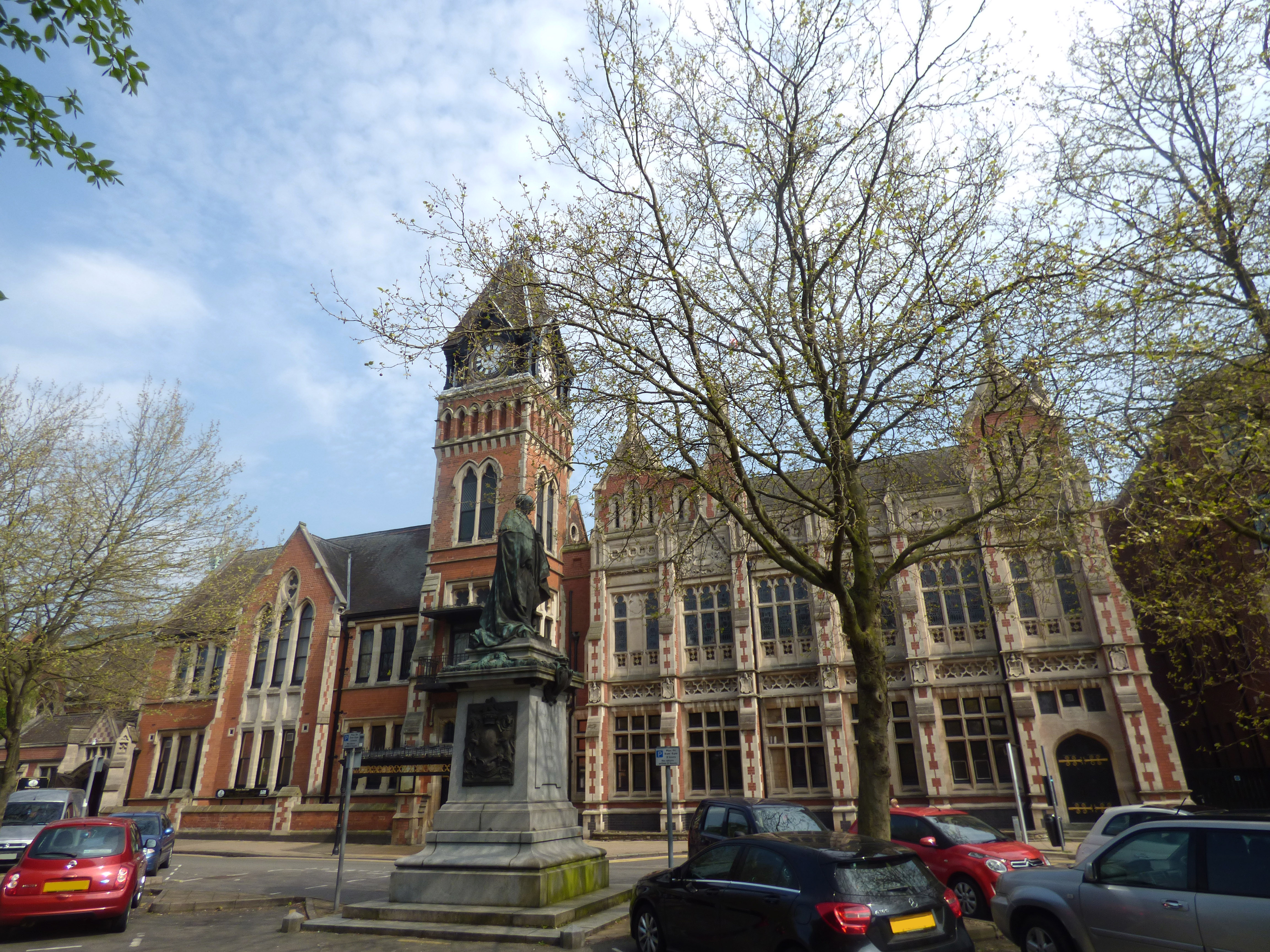
- Town Hall, King Edward Place, Burton-on-Trent, DE14 2EB

Website
- www.eaststaffsbc.gov.uk

East Staffordshire Borough Council provides district-level services. County-level services are provided by Staffordshire County Council. The whole district is also covered by civil parishes, which form a third tier of local government.

=== Political control ===
The council has been under Labour majority control since the 2023 election.

The first elections were held in 1973, initially operating as a shadow authority alongside the outgoing authorities until the new arrangements came into effect on 1 April 1974. Political control of the council since 1974 has been as follows:

Party in control	Years
No overall control	1974–1976
Conservative	1976–1979
No overall control	1979–1995
Labour	1995–2003
Conservative	2003–2014
No overall control	2014–2015
Conservative	2015–2023
Labour	2023–present

=== Leadership ===
The role of mayor is largely ceremonial in East Staffordshire. Political leadership is instead provided by the leader of the council. The leaders since 2009 have been:

Councillor	Party	From	To
Richard Grosvenor	Conservative	2009	24 Feb 2014
Julian Mott	Labour	24 Feb 2014	May 2015
Richard Grosvenor	Conservative	May 2015	May 2019
Duncan Goodfellow	Conservative	17 May 2019	Mar 2022
George Allen	Conservative	21 Mar 2022	May 2023
Mick Fitzpatrick	Labour	26 May 2023	

=== Composition ===
Following the 2023 election the composition of the council was:

Party	Councillors
Labour	21
Conservative	15
Independent	1
Total	37

=== Elections ===
Since the last boundary changes in 2023 the council has comprised 37 councillors representing 16 wards, with each ward electing one, two or three councillors. Elections are held every four years.

=== Premises ===
The council is based at Burton upon Trent Town Hall. The building was originally built in 1878 as the St Paul's Institute and Liberal Club, before being given to the old Burton upon Trent Borough Council in 1891 and subsequently converted to become a town hall. Significant extensions were added in 1894 and 1939.

== Transport ==
Main roads within the borough include the A38 through Burton upon Trent and the A50 near Uttoxeter.

There are two railway stations in the borough, Burton-on-Trent on the Cross Country Route and Uttoxeter on the Crewe to Derby Line, There is also a station serving Tutbury, also on the Crewe to Derby Line called Tutbury and Hatton. This is in the South Derbyshire district.

== Media ==
In terms of television, the area is served by BBC West Midlands and ITV Central (West) broadcasting from Birmingham. Television signals are received the Sutton Coldfield TV transmitter. The Waltham TV transmitter can also be received which broadcast BBC East Midlands and ITV Central (East) from Nottingham.

Local radio stations for the area are:

- BBC Radio Derby on 104.5 FM
- Capital Mid-Counties (formerly Touch FM) on 102.4 FM
- Greatest Hits Radio Midlands on 101.8 FM

Local newspapers are Burton Mail and Uttoxeter Advertiser.

== Towns and parishes ==
The whole borough is covered by civil parishes. The parish council for Uttoxeter has declared that parish to be a town, allowing it to take the style "town council". Between 1974 and 2003 the former county borough of Burton upon Trent was an unparished area. There were charter trustees for Burton which operated between 1974 and 1992, allowing Burton to continue to appoint a mayor. They ceased to operate when East Staffordshire was made a borough in 1992, allowing a district-wide mayor to be appointed instead. The Burton area was divided into seven civil parishes in 2003.

== See also ==
- Grade II* listed buildings in East Staffordshire
