= Upper Ray Meadows =

Nature reserve in Buckinghamshire, England

Coordinates: 51.875°N 1.0289°W

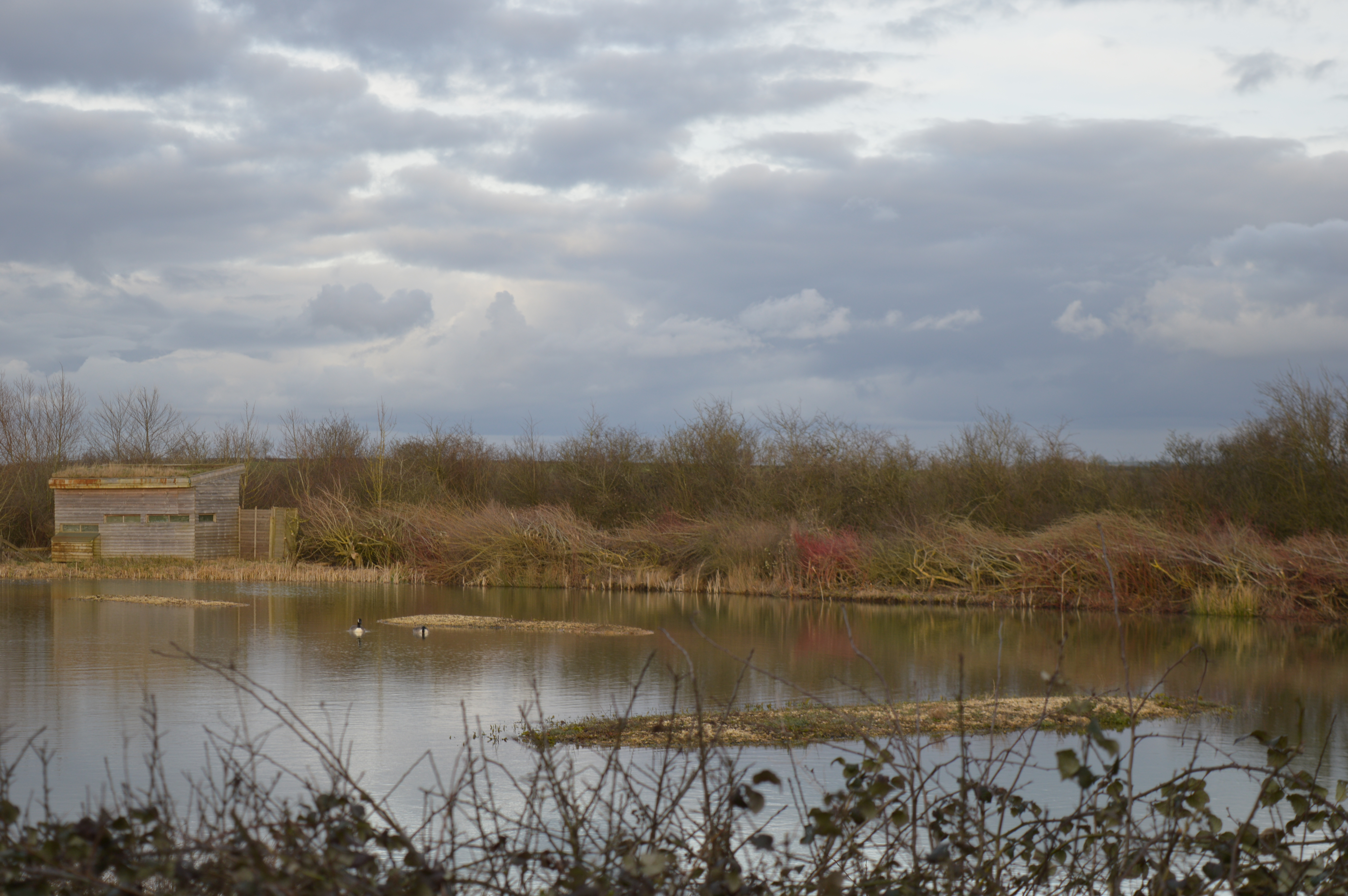
View from a bird hide at Gallows Bridge Farm

Upper Ray Meadows is a 181-hectare nature reserve, managed by the Berkshire, Buckinghamshire and Oxfordshire Wildlife Trust, south of Marsh Gibbon in Buckinghamshire. It is composed of a number of areas, one of which, Long Herdon Meadow, is a biological Site of Special Scientific Interest.

The site consists of meadows on the floodplain of the River Ray, and it is a stronghold for rare species because heavy clay soils and frequent flooding makes arable farming difficult. The meadows are managed by traditional farming methods, and areas of medieval ridge and furrow still survive. In the summer, drier areas have displays of wild flowers such as black knapweed, meadowsweet and tufted vetch. The site supports a small breeding population of lapwings and curlews, and the Trust has created many new ponds and ditches to assist birds and invertebrates.

Gallows Bridge Farm, which only has access to bird hides, is accessed from The Broadway. The Bernwood Jubilee Way between Marsh Gibbon and the A41 road runs along eastern boundary of Long Herdon Meadow, and there is an entrance where the footpath crosses the River Ray. Grange Meadow is accessed from Long Herdon Meadow. Bernwood Jubilee Way crosses the A41 and goes through Leaches Farm.
