= Fencott and Murcott =

Coordinates: 51.8329°N 1.1691°W

- Civil parish
- Location within Oxfordshire
- Civil parish: Fencott and Murcott
- District: Cherwell
- Shire county: Oxfordshire
- Region: South East
- Country: England
- Sovereign state: United Kingdom
- Post town: Kidlington
- Postcode district: OX5
- Dialling code: 01865
- Police: Thames Valley
- Fire: Oxfordshire
- Ambulance: South Central
- UK Parliament: Bicester and Woodstock

Fencott and Murcott is a civil parish about 4 miles (6 km) south of Bicester in the Cherwell district of Oxfordshire, England. The parish is bounded on the north and west by the River Ray and has an area of just over 3,300 acres (1,300 ha) being 13.49 square kilometres (5.21 sq mi) inclusive of roads and watercourses. It includes the villages of Fencott and Murcott and had a population of about 251 residents in 2021. There are no shops or post offices but there is one public house, the Nut Tree Inn at Murcott. The M40 motorway passes through the northern part of the parish. The parish covers most of Otmoor, including the Otmoor RSPB nature reserve.
