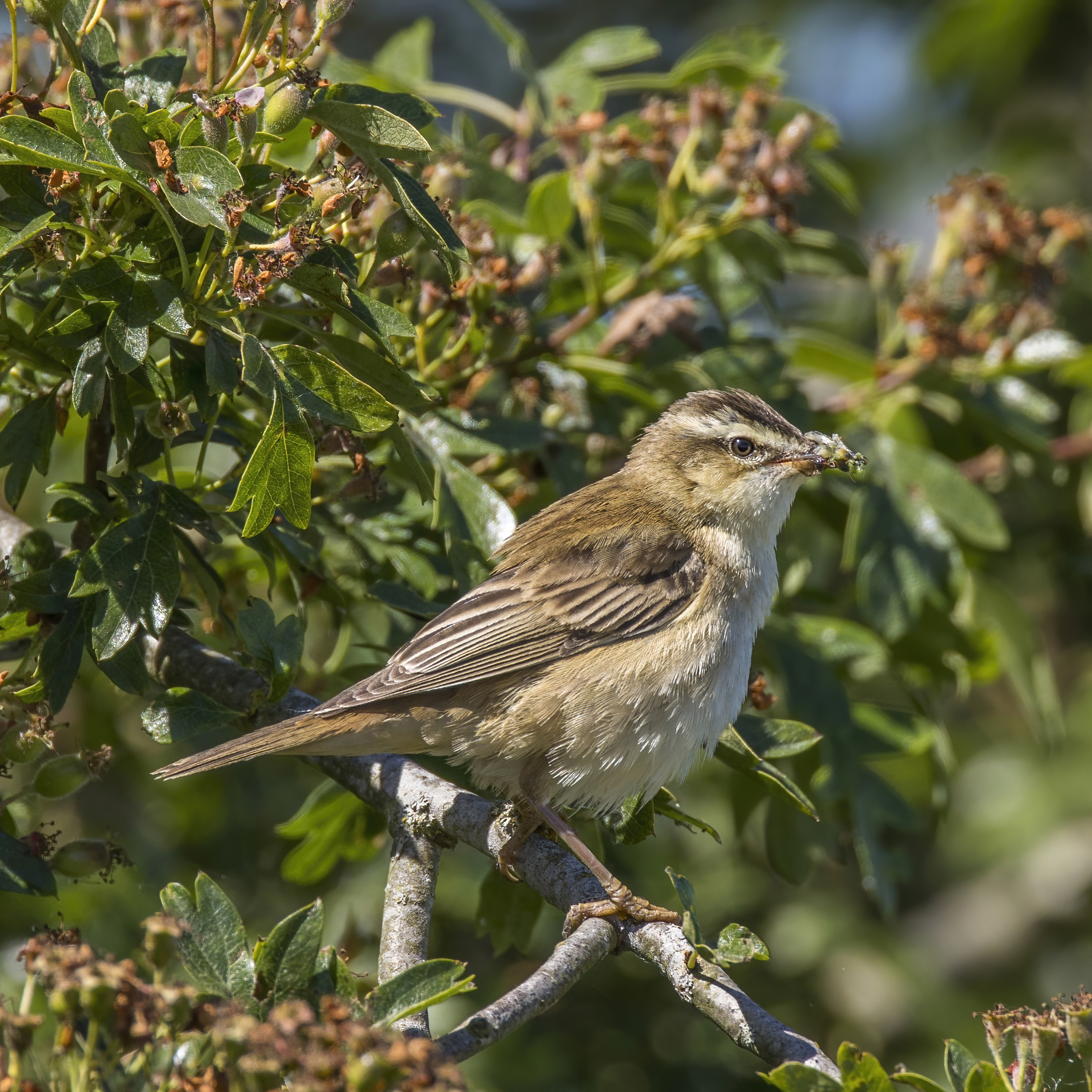
- Otmoor RSPB reserve
- The song of a male sedge warbler

Conservation status
- Least Concern (IUCN 3.1)

Scientific classification
- Kingdom: Animalia
- Phylum: Chordata
- Class: Aves
- Order: Passeriformes
- Family: Acrocephalidae
- Genus: Acrocephalus
- Species: A. schoenobaenus

Binomial name
- Acrocephalus schoenobaenus (Linnaeus, 1758)
- Distribution map Breeding Passage Non-breeding

Synonyms
- Motacilla schoenobaenus Linnaeus, 1758

= Sedge warbler =

Species of bird

The sedge warbler (Acrocephalus schoenobaenus) is an Old World warbler in the genus Acrocephalus. It is a medium-sized warbler with a brown, streaked back and wings and a distinct pale supercilium. Sedge warblers are migratory, crossing the Sahara to get from their European and Asian breeding grounds to spend winter in Africa. The male's song is composed of random chattering phrases and can include mimicry of other species. The sedge warbler is mostly insectivorous.

== Taxonomy ==
The sedge warbler was formally described by the Swedish naturalist Carl Linnaeus in 1758 in the tenth edition of his Systema Naturae under the binomial name Motacilla schoenobaenus. The species is now placed in the genus Acrocephalus that was introduced in 1811 by Johann Andreas Naumann and his son Johann Friedrich Naumann. British ornithologists did not distinguish the species from the common reed warbler until the 18th century. The genus name Acrocephalus is from Ancient Greek akros, "highest", and kephale, "head". It is possible that the Naumanns thought akros meant "sharp-pointed". The specific schoenobaenus is from Ancient Greek skhoinos, "reed", and baino, "to tread". It is a translation of the old Swedish name for the bird, Sävstigare. The species is considered to be monotypic: no subspecies are recognised.

== Description ==
This is a medium-sized warbler, 11.5–13 cm (4.5–5.1 in) long and weighing around 12 g (0.42 oz). It has a streaked brown back and wings, and pale underparts. The rump is warm brown and unstreaked, contrasting with the duller wings. The forehead is flattened, the crown is streaked with black, and the bill is strong and pointed. There is a prominent whitish supercilium. The legs are greyish.

The plumage of the sexes is identical, although they can be told apart when caught for ringing by the presence of a brood patch or cloacal protuberance. Juvenile birds have dark spots on the breast. They can be easier to confuse with aquatic warblers due to an apparent pale central crown stripe contrasting with the darker edges. Other similar species include moustached warblers and Pallas's grasshopper warblers. The oldest recorded sedge warbler was a bird ringed in Finland which reached the age of 10 years, 1 month. The typical lifespan is 2 years.

The song is varied, rushed and chattering, with sweeter phrases and some mimicry, typical of the Acrocephalus warblers. It is composed of phrases in random order, so that it is never the same. Male sedge warblers which have the widest repertoire mate with the largest number of females.

== Distribution and habitat ==
The sedge warbler has a large range and an estimated Global Extent of Occurrence of 10 million square kilometres, with a large global population including between 8.8 million and 15 million birds in Europe. Data analysis by the British Trust for Ornithology has shown that fluctuations in the sedge warbler population stem from the adult survival rate, due to changes in rainfall on the birds' wintering grounds. Global changes in population have not been measured, but the sedge warbler's status is designated 'of least concern' by BirdLife International.

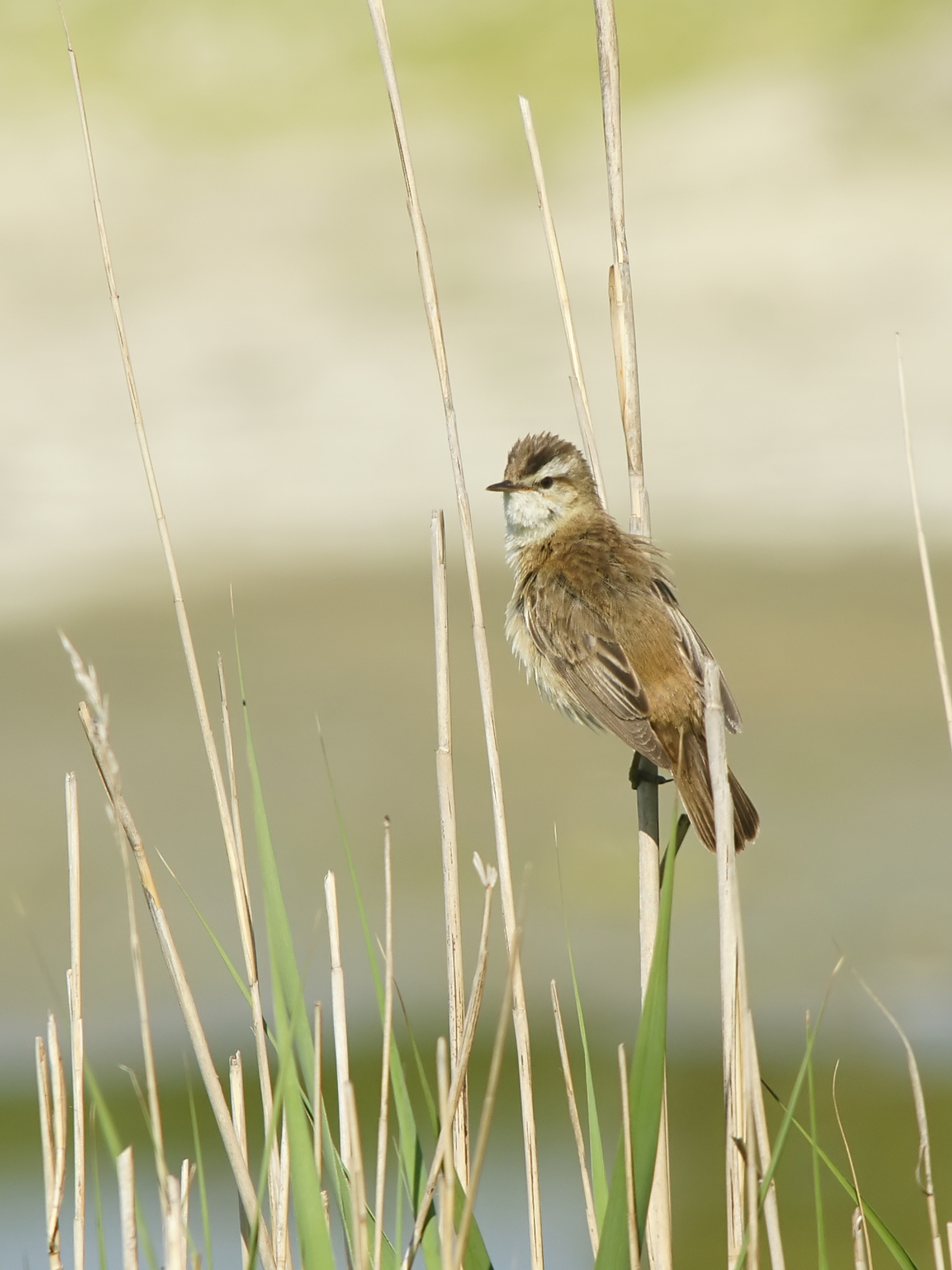
Sedge warbler in its habitat: a reedbed. Uitkerke, Belgium.

It breeds across Europe and western and central Asia and is migratory. After feeding up post-breeding, they migrate quickly across southern Europe and the Sahara from August to September. Studies in Nigeria and Uganda suggest that sedge warblers return to spend winter at the same sites, year after year.

All sedge warblers spend winter in sub-Saharan Africa, from Senegal in the west to Ethiopia in the east, and as far south as the eastern Cape Province of South Africa and northern Namibia. The routes taken on the southward migration, and their eventual wintering grounds, correspond to the birds' breeding grounds. Birds ringed in the United Kingdom and Netherlands are later found from south-west Iberia to Italy; birds from Sweden are recovered in central Europe and Italy; while Finnish birds are found in north-east Italy and Malta east to the Aegean region. Sedge warblers from the former Soviet Union take routes via the eastern Mediterranean Sea and Middle East.

Loss of wetland areas for feeding on migration, and the expansion of the Sahara Desert, pose threats to the sedge warbler's breeding population. Birds begin leaving Africa in late February, fatten up at wetlands before and probably after crossing the Sahara, and arrive in Europe from March onwards.

Unlike other members of the Acrocephalus genus, the sedge warbler's range stretches from the Arctic to mid-latitudes. It is adapted to cool, cloudy and moist conditions. Though it is often found in wetlands, it can breed 500 metres (1,600 ft) or more away from water. During the breeding season, this is a species found in reedbeds, often with scrub, ditches and habitats away from water including hedgerows, patches of stinging nettles, and arable crops. On the African wintering grounds, habitats such as reeds at wetlands, papyrus, grass, sedge and reedmace and tall elephant grass are used. It can be found at altitudes of 1,800–2,400 metres (5,900–7,900 ft) above sea level in Ethiopia.

== Behaviour ==
=== Breeding ===
Male sedge warblers commence singing only a few hours after arriving on their breeding territory. The song is given from a bare perch such as a reed stem or bush, or from cover and during routine flights within their territory. Song-flights are also performed: while singing, the bird takes off, rises to a height of around 2–5 metres (6.6–16.4 ft) and then after a short circling flight, makes a slow, 'parachuting' descent, often with the wings held up in a 'v' shape. The song has the function of attracting a mate, rather than keeping other males away, and is stopped as soon as a mate is found. Contact calls are described as chirr or kerr; and these calls are repeated quickly to form a rattling alarm call.

Studies have found that early-arriving males occupy the best breeding territories. A study in Nottinghamshire, England, showed that a third of males which returned bred within 50 m or less of their previous breeding site, and only 14% bred further than 400 m (1,300 ft) away. Another study conducted in the Nida River valley in Poland showed that individual males tend to show the biggest shifts in territory location in the first two seasons of life (up to >400 m). This seems to be caused by an increasing early arrival on the breeding grounds in the first years. Hence, they find more potential territories left unoccupied by conspecifics upon arrival, causing them to shift to better quality ones.

Pairs are usually social monogamous, but not strictly so. Males commonly practice promiscuity, and part of the males settle a new territory and resume territorial behavior whilst the female incubates the first clutch. When successfully pairing with another female the male will usually take part in rearing both broods.

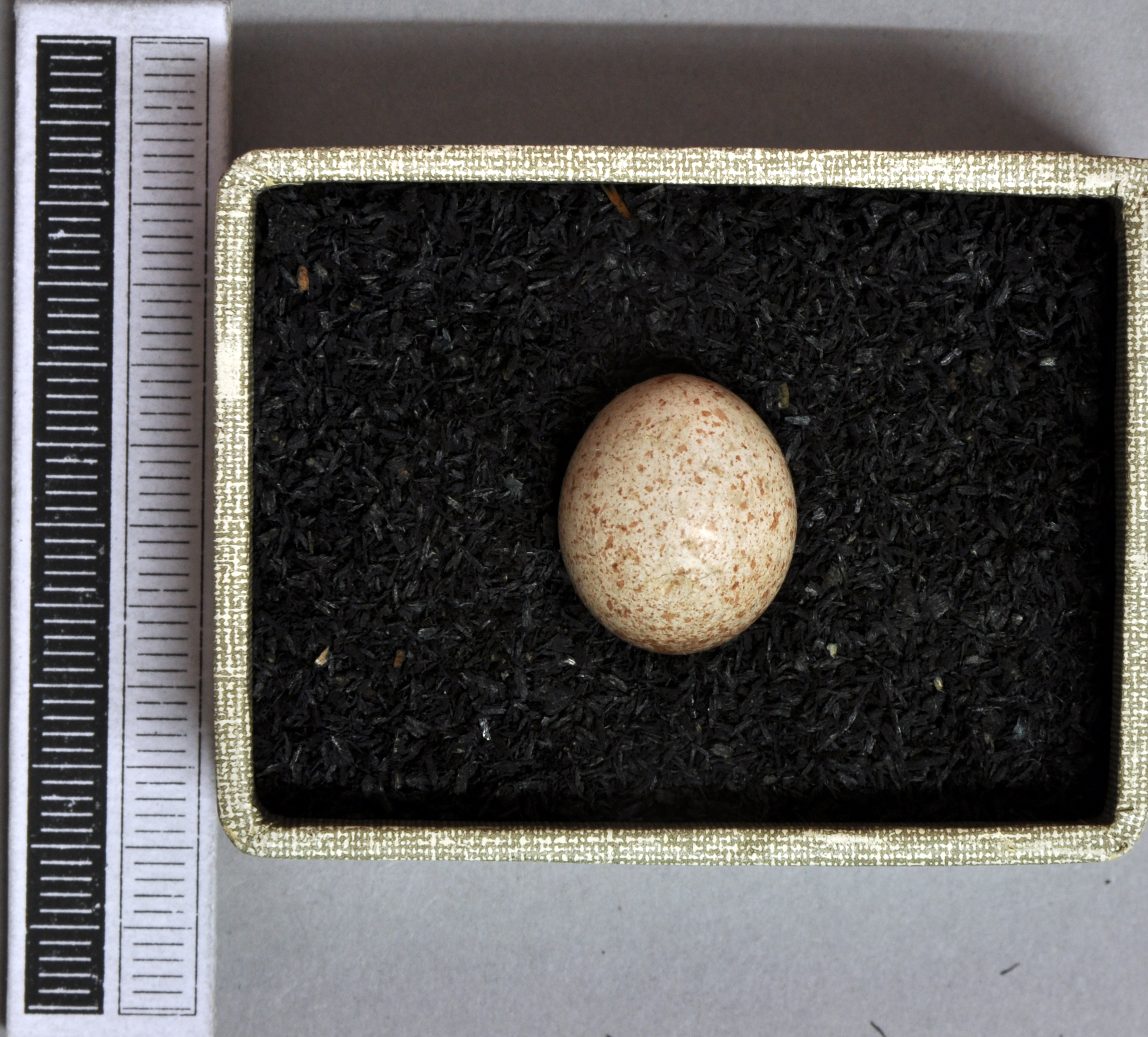
Egg, Collection Museum Wiesbaden

If eggs or chicks are predated, the female will often leave the male, who then resumes singing and pairs with another female. Hybridisation with the Eurasian reed warbler has been recorded.

The male defends a territory of around 0.1 to 0.2 hectares; in a study at Zaanstad, Netherlands, 68 territories were studied, with an average size of 1064 metres square one year, and 904 m sq the next. The nest, built by the female, is in vegetation on the ground or up to a height of 50 cm (20 in). The cup-shaped structure has an outer layer of grass, stems and leaves, plus spiders' webs, with a thick, finer layer inside including reed flowers, animal hair and plant down. It is woven around vertical plant stems. From 3 to 5 greenish-yellow and brown-mottled eggs are laid, measuring 18 x 13 mm and weighing 1.6 g each. They are incubated by the female for 14 days; the chicks are altricial and naked. Both male and female care for the chicks, which fledge after 13–14 days. After leaving the nest, young sedge warblers continue begging for food from their parents for 1 to 2 weeks after learning to fly.

=== Food and feeding ===
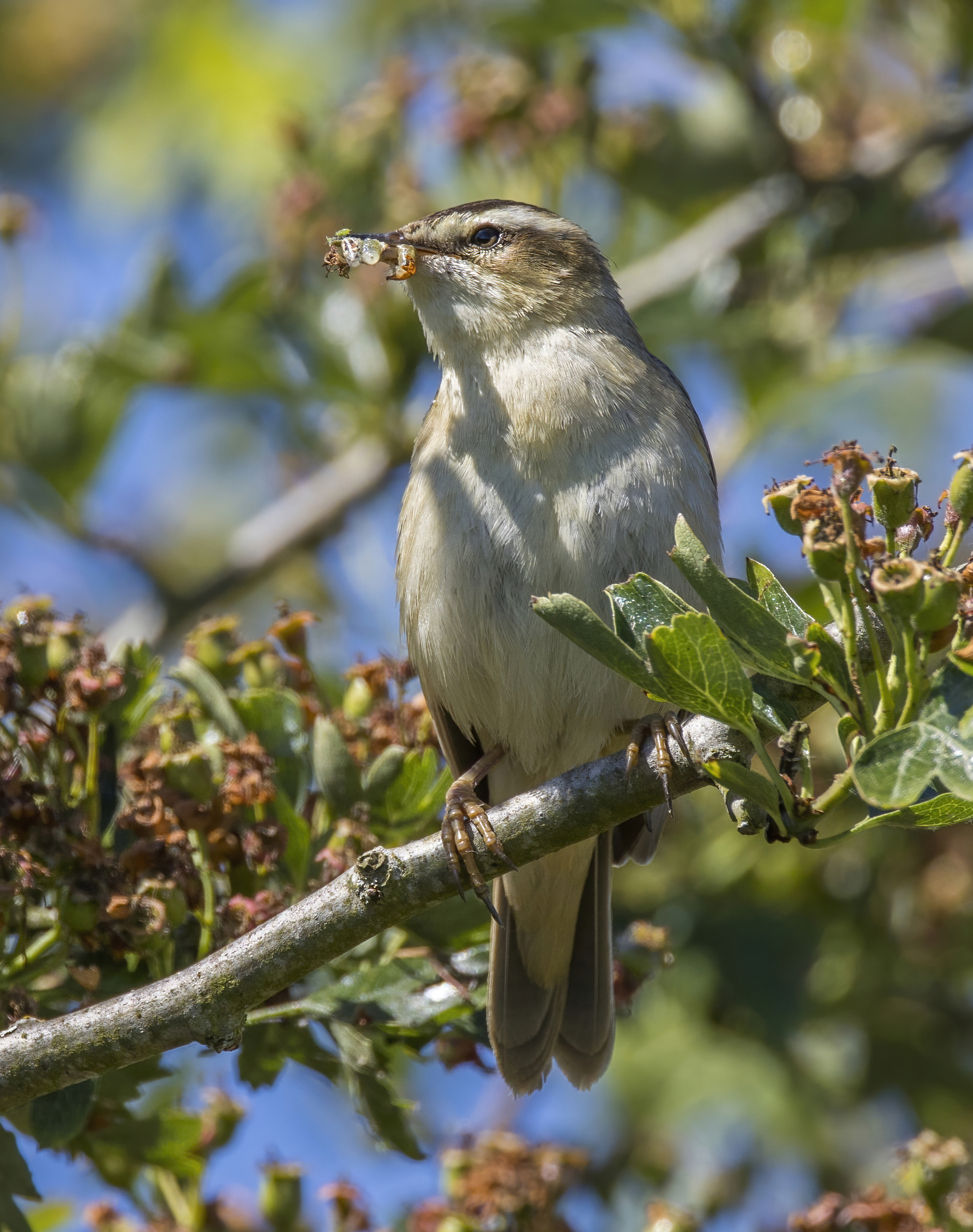
Sedge warbler carrying grubs

Prey taken by sedge warblers includes mayflies, dragonflies and damselflies, grasshoppers, bugs, lacewings, moths, beetles and flies. Vegetable material includes elderberries and blackberries. On their wintering grounds food includes non-biting midges and flowers and berries from the toothbrush tree.

In late July, prior to migration, it appears that sedge warblers seek out sites with large numbers of plum-reed aphids and stay there longer than at other places; ringing studies show that birds may move considerable distances (e.g. from southern England to northern France) in search of food before beginning their actual migration. In Portugal, the aphid supply dries up too early for sedge warblers to utilise it, so many birds do not stop off there and are already heavy with fat when they pass through. Birds with the heaviest fat reserves built up before migration are capable of non-stop flights from Africa to southern Britain, or from Uganda to Iraq, for example. Some double their normal weight when 'fuelling' for migration. Lighter birds are forced to make the journey in several shorter parts.

Sedge warblers feed in low, thick vegetation, especially reeds and rushes, but also in arable fields and around bushes. A study at Attenborough, Nottinghamshire in England, found that the habitats used for foraging during the breeding season were 47% marshland, mostly Glyceria grasses, 26% shrub, 21% field vegetation and 6% woodland. Feeding techniques include 'picking' insects from vegetation while perched or sometimes hovering, and 'leap-catching', when the bird grabs flying insects as it flies between perches. Sedge warblers tend to hop between plant stems and pick insects from underneath leaves; they take advantage of the low temperatures around dusk and dawn which make their prey less mobile.
