= Long Herdon Meadow =

Protected area in Buckinghamshire, England

Coordinates: 51.8766°N 1.0601°W

- Site of Special Scientific Interest
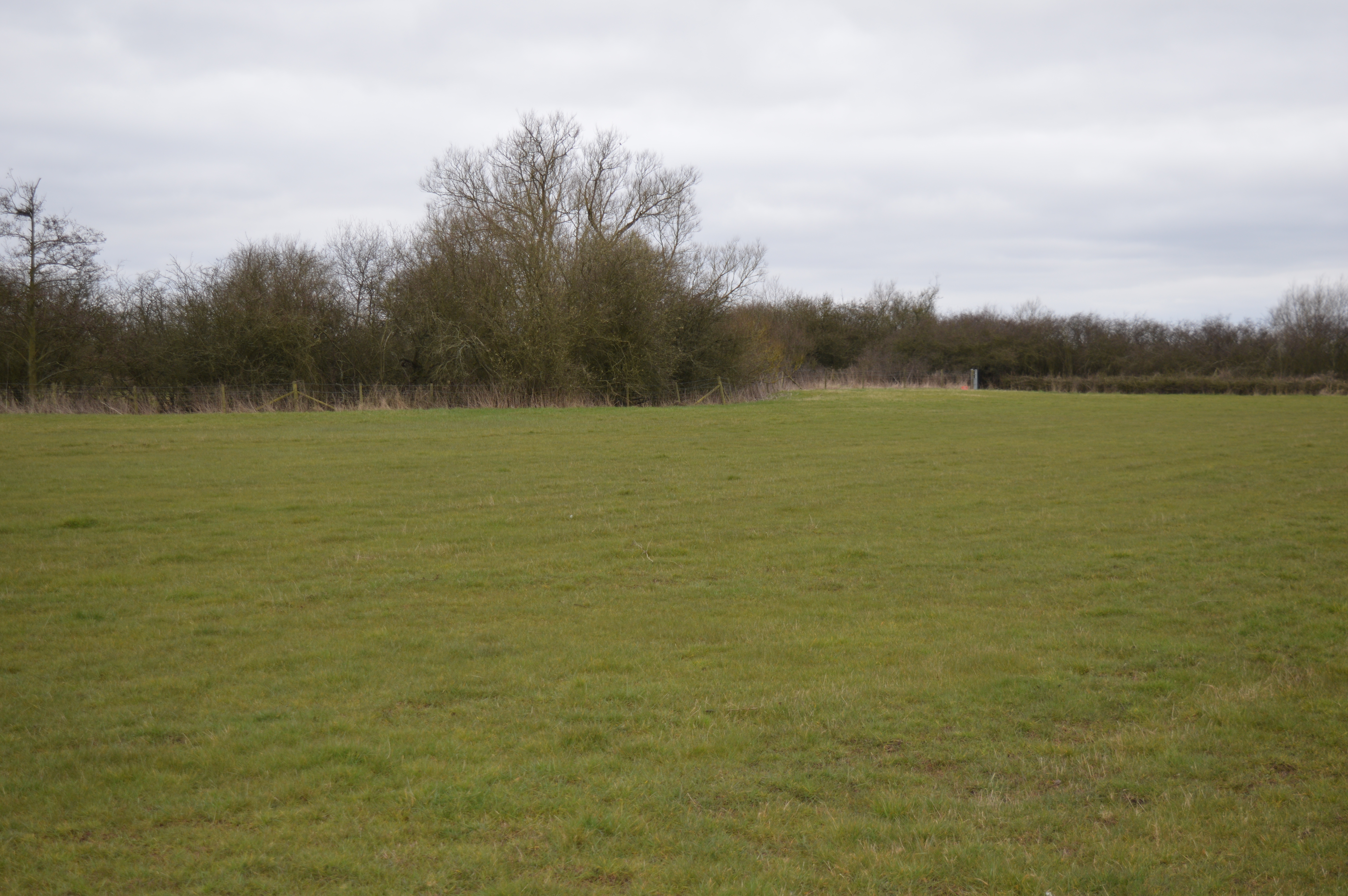
- Location of Long Herdon Meadow.
- Area of search: Buckinghamshire
- Grid reference: SP648202
- Interest: Biological
- Area: 4.5 ha (11 acres)
- Notification date: 1985
- Location map: Magic Map

Long Herdon Meadow is a 4.5-hectare (11-acre) biological Site of Special Scientific Interest south of Marsh Gibbon in Buckinghamshire. It is part of Upper Ray Meadows nature reserve, which is managed by the Berkshire, Buckinghamshire and Oxfordshire Wildlife Trust.

The site is an alluvial meadow next to the River Ray in the Vale of Aylesbury. It has clay soil and is liable to flooding. A regime of a hay cut followed by cattle grazing, without the use of artificial fertilisers, has resulted in a diverse grassland habitat now rare in England. Herbs include meadow buttercup, lesser knapweed and devil's bit scabious. Ditches and the riverbank provide a permanently wet habitat, encouraging wading birds such as snipe and curlew. Invertebrates include damselflies.

There is access from the Bernwood Jubilee Way between Marsh Gibbon and the A41 road, adjacent to the River Ray.
