= Fencott =

Hamlet in Oxfordshire, England

Coordinates: 51.840°N 1.168°W

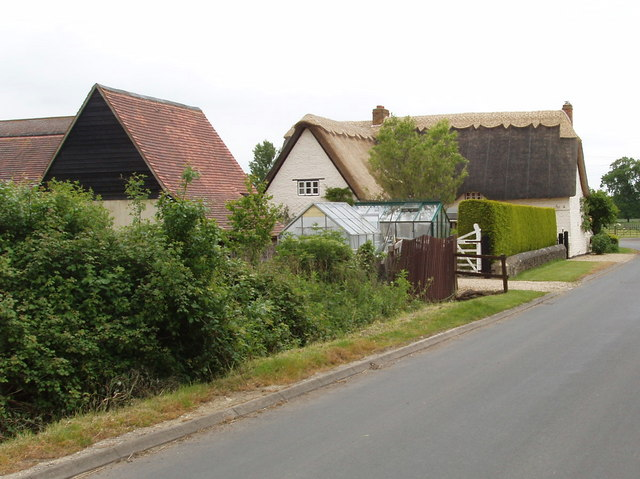
- Corner Farm, Fencott

- Location within Oxfordshire
- OS grid reference: SP574160
- Civil parish: Fencott and Murcott
- District: Cherwell
- Shire county: Oxfordshire
- Region: South East
- Country: England
- Sovereign state: United Kingdom
- Post town: Kidlington
- Postcode district: OX5
- Dialling code: 01865
- Police: Thames Valley
- Fire: Oxfordshire
- Ambulance: South Central
- UK Parliament: Banbury
- Website: Fencott and Murcott Parish Council

Fencott is a hamlet between the River Ray and Otmoor in the civil parish of Fencott and Murcott, about 4 miles (6.4 km) south of Bicester in Oxfordshire, England.

== History ==
In 1542 the Crown granted most of the land at Murcott to the Dean and Chapter of Westminster Abbey. They retained it until the end of the 19th century, when it passed to the Ecclesiastical Commissioners. There was also one hide of land that belonged to Abingdon Abbey. In about 1180 the Abbot of Abingdon gave this holding in an exchange of land to one William Turpin. In 1230 Godstow Abbey bought the land from Osbert Turpin, but had to continue paying quit-rent to Abingdon Abbey. At the dissolution of the monasteries in the 1530s the land passed to the Crown, which disposed of it in 1553. Fencott used to have a public house, the Black Bull. It closed before 1939, but there is still a Black Bull Lane in the hamlet.

== Sources and further reading ==
- Chambers, R.A. (1986). "A Roman Timber Bridge at Ivy Farm, Fencott with Murcott, Oxon., 1979". Oxoniensia. LI. Oxfordshire Architectural and Historical Society: 31–36.
- Lobel, Mary D, ed. (1959). A History of the County of Oxford, Volume 6. Victoria County History. pp. 80–92.
