= Oddington =

Oddington may refer to:

- Oddington, Gloucestershire, England
- Oddington, Oxfordshire, England
