= Murcott, Oxfordshire =

Village in England

Coordinates: 51.838°N 1.153°W

Murcott
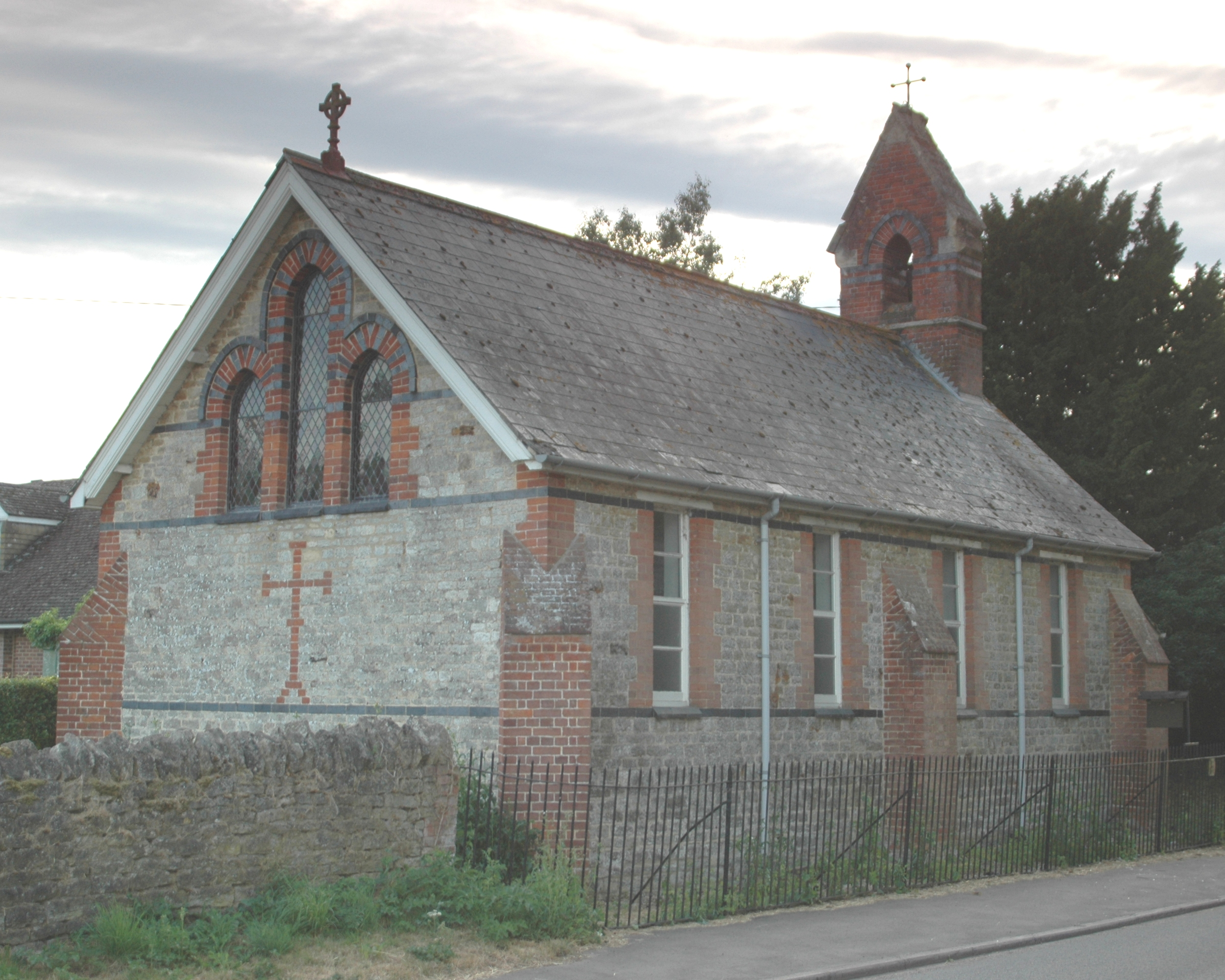

- Location within Oxfordshire
- OS grid reference: SP584158
- Civil parish: Fencott and Murcott
- District: Cherwell
- Shire county: Oxfordshire
- Region: South East
- Country: England
- Sovereign state: United Kingdom
- Post town: Kidlington
- Postcode district: OX5
- Dialling code: 01865
- Police: Thames Valley
- Fire: Oxfordshire
- Ambulance: South Central
- UK Parliament: Banbury
- Website: Fencott and Murcott Parish Council

Murcott is a village between the River Ray and Otmoor in the civil parish of Fencott and Murcott, about 4 miles (6.4 km) south of Bicester in Oxfordshire, England.

== History ==
In 1542 the Crown granted almost all of the land at Murcott to the Dean and Chapter of Westminster Abbey. They retained it until the end of the 19th century, when it passed to the Ecclesiastical Commissioners. Murcott Mission Room was built in 1895 to a plain Early English design by local Gothic Revival architect A. Mardon Mowbray. The Mission Room is a Church of England chapel, part of the Benefice of the Ray Valley. The Nut Tree Inn public house is a mid-18th century thatched building. It is a gastropub and in 2009 was awarded a Michelin Star. Murcott used to have a second pub, the Marlake House, but this had closed by 1939.

== Sources ==
- Lobel, Mary D, ed. (1959). A History of the County of Oxford, Volume 6. Victoria County History. pp. 80–92.
- Sherwood, Jennifer; Pevsner, Nikolaus (1974). Oxfordshire. The Buildings of England. Harmondsworth: Penguin Books. p. 713. ISBN 0-14-071045-0.
