= Beckley, Oxfordshire =

Village in Oxfordshire, England

Coordinates: 51.797°N 1.183°W

Beckley
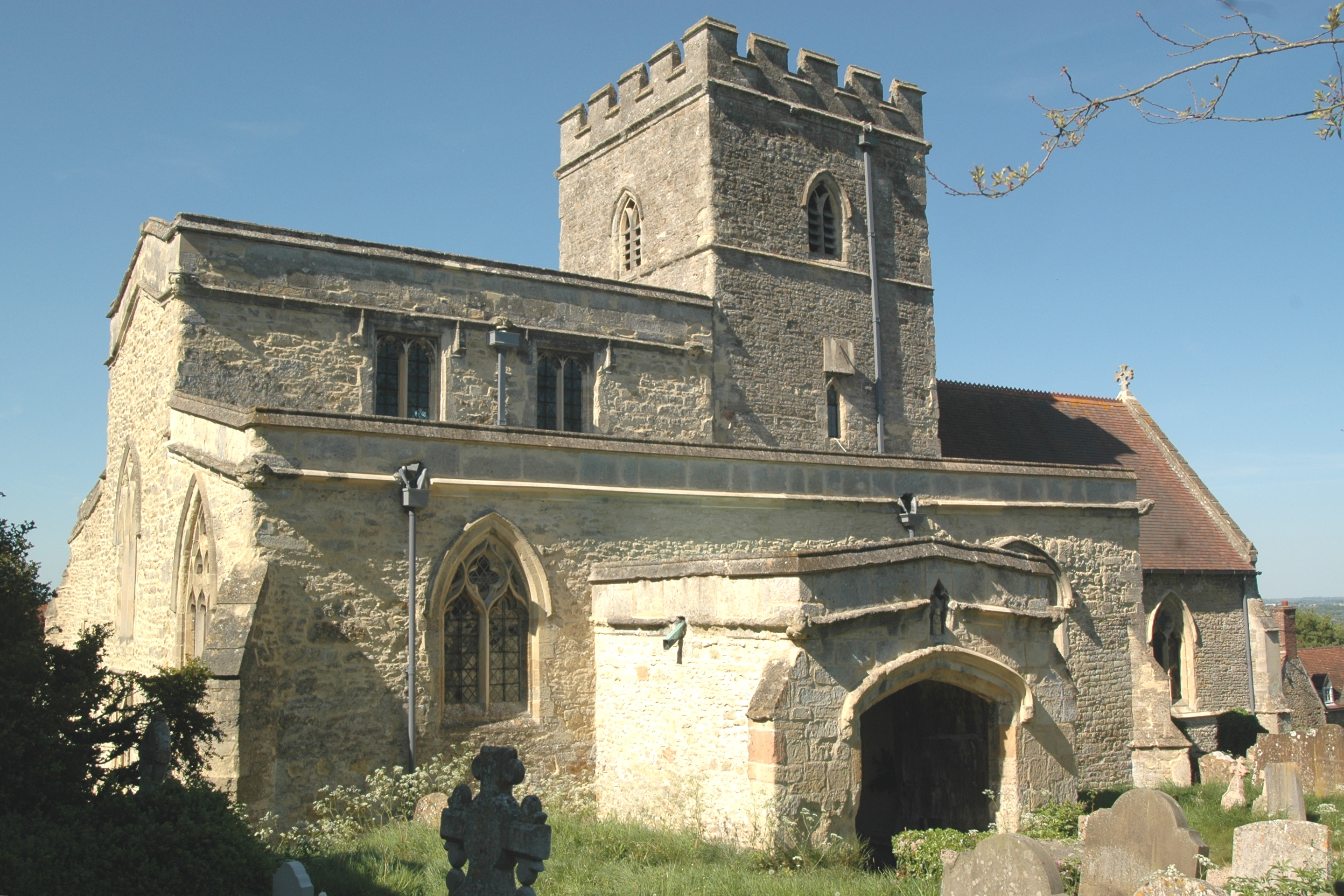
- Parish church of the Assumption of the Blesséd Virgin Mary

- Location within Oxfordshire
- Population: 608 (parish, including Stowood) (2011 census)
- OS grid reference: SP5611
- Civil parish: Beckley and Stowood
- District: South Oxfordshire
- Shire county: Oxfordshire
- Region: South East
- Country: England
- Sovereign state: United Kingdom
- Post town: Oxford
- Postcode district: OX3
- Dialling code: 01865
- Police: Thames Valley
- Fire: Oxfordshire
- Ambulance: South Central
- UK Parliament: Henley
- Website: Beckley and Stowood

Beckley is a small village in the civil parish of Beckley and Stowood, in the South Oxfordshire district, in the county of Oxfordshire, England. It is about 4.5 miles (7 km) northeast of the centre of Oxford. The 2011 census recorded the parish of Beckley and Stowood's population as 608. The village is 400 feet (120 m) above sea level on the northern brow of a hill overlooking Otmoor. The hill is the highest part of the parish, rising to 463 feet (141 m) south of the village near Stow Wood. On the eastern brow of the hill is Oxford transmitting station, a television relay mast that is a local landmark. In 1931 the parish of Beckley had a population of 288. On 1 April 1932 the parish was abolished to form "Beckley and Stowood", part also went to "Fencott and Murcott".

== Archaeology ==
The course of the former Roman road that linked Dorchester on Thames with Alchester passes through the village. Part of it is now a bridleway. In the 19th century the remains of a Roman villa were found beside the road to Upper Park Farm east of the village. Artefacts from the villa are held in the Ashmolean Museum.

== Manor ==
Until the Norman Conquest of England the manor of Beckley was one of many that belonged to Saxon Wigod, thegn of Wallingford. After the conquest the Norman baron Robert D'Oyly married Wigod's daughter Ealdgyth and thereby acquired Wigod's estates. D'Oyly then gave a number of the manors to his brother-in-arms Roger d'Ivry. These included Beckley, which d'Ivry then made the caput of his estates. Beckley remained with Roger's heirs until early in the 12th century, but the d'Ivry family seems to have died out by about 1120.

By 1155 or 1156 the d'Ivry estates had passed to John de St. John of Stanton St. John and Reynold de St. Valery. Reynold died leaving the estates to his son Bernard, who in turn died leaving them Reynold's younger son Thomas. Thomas supported Philip II of France in his wars against England, so by 1196 or 1197 Richard I seized the de St. Valery estates including Beckley. During the 13th century Thomas de St. Valery and his heir by marriage, Robert de Dreux, changed sides a number of times between England and France. They forfeited and regained their English estates a number of times as a result.

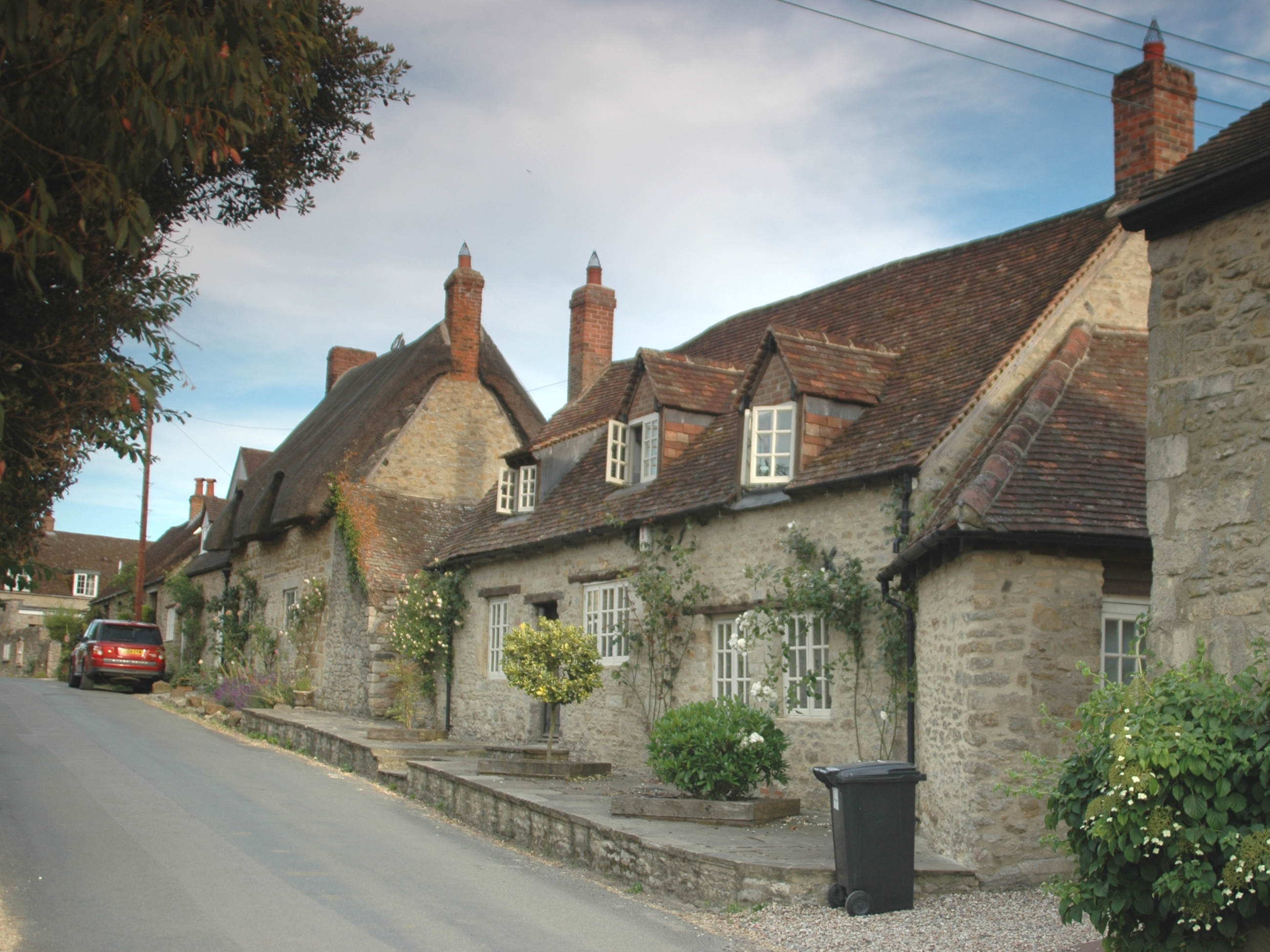
One and a half storey vernacular cottages in High Road, Beckley. They are built of coursed rubble masonry of local stone, typical of the Great Rebuilding of England.

In 1227 Henry III granted the St. Valery estates to his brother Richard of Cornwall. Beckley remained important as the caput of the Honour of St. Valery, which was sometimes called either the "honour of St. Valery of Beckley" or simply the "honour of Beckley". When Richard's heir Edmund, 2nd Earl of Cornwall died childless in 1300 his cousin Edward I inherited his estates. In 1308 Edward II granted Beckley to Hugh le Despenser, 1st Earl of Winchester, who then leased it to Sir John de Hadlow. When Sir John died in 1346 Beckley passed to The Black Prince, who in 1356 granted it to Sir John Chandos. In 1367 Beckley reverted to Edward III, and when his successor Richard II married Anne of Bohemia in 1382 he gave Beckley to Anne as part of her dowry.

In 1394 Queen Anne died and Richard II gave Beckley to Sir John Golafre. When Sir John died in 1396 Richard granted Beckley to Sir Philip de la Vache, who went on to serve as Chamberlain to the Queen under Henry IV. Sir Philip had died by 1408, and when Henry V married Catherine de Valois in 1420 he gave her Beckley as part of her dowry. For the remainder of the 15th century the freehold of Beckley remained with the Crown, with a succession of noblemen appointed keepers or "Parkers" to manage Beckley Park on the King's behalf.

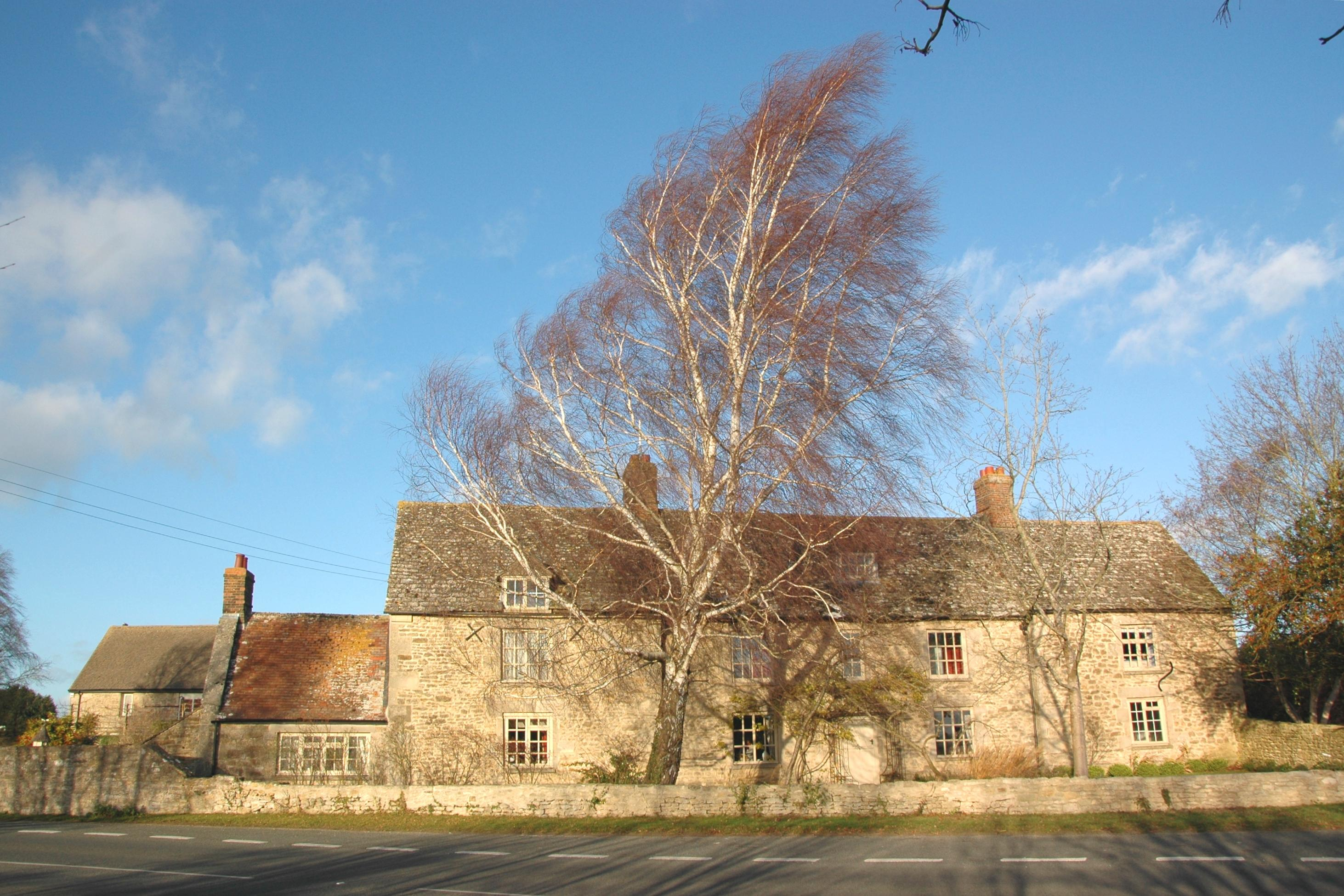
New Inn Farm, Stowood, near Beckley, was built in the 18th century.

Under the will of Henry VIII, Beckley manor passed to Princess Elizabeth in March 1550. In April 1550 Sir Walter Mildmay conveyed it to Sir John Williams, later Baron Williams de Thame. In 1559 Baron Williams died leaving Beckley and Horton to his daughter Margaret and son-in-law Sir Henry Norreys. The manors remained in their family until 1645, when Elizabeth Norris, Baroness Norreys died leaving her estates to her daughter Bridget Wray, Baroness Norreys, who then married Montagu Bertie, 2nd Earl of Lindsey. When Bridget died in 1657 Beckley passed to their son James Bertie, 5th Baron Norreys, whom Charles II made 1st Earl of Abingdon in 1682. Beckley and Horton remained with the Bertie family until 1919, when Viscount Bertie, younger brother of Montagu Bertie, 7th Earl of Abingdon, broke up the estate and sold it in small lots.

== Deer park ==
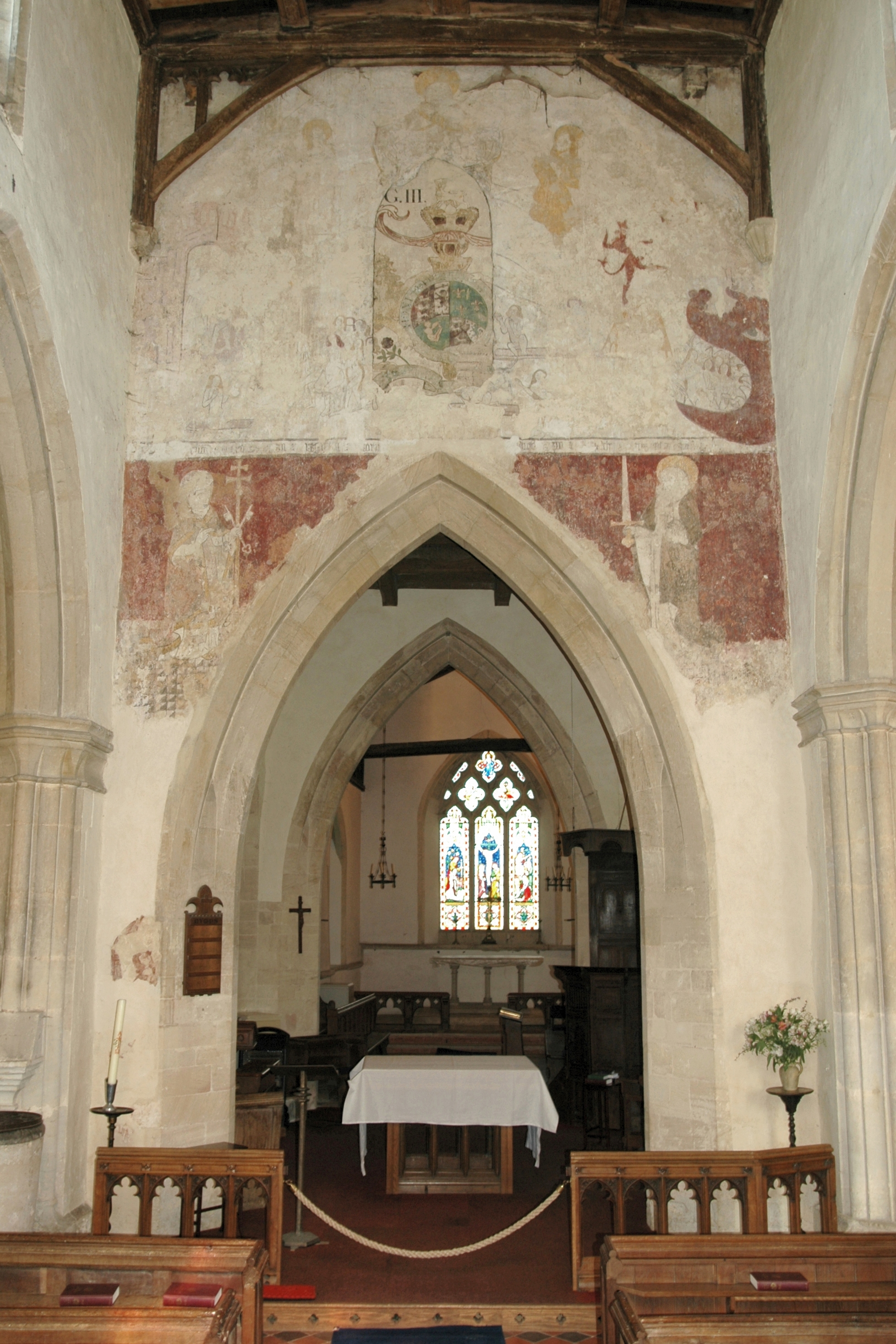
Parish church of the Assumption: chancel arch with 14th-century paintings of Doom and SS Peter and Paul, plus 18th-century painting of Royal arms.

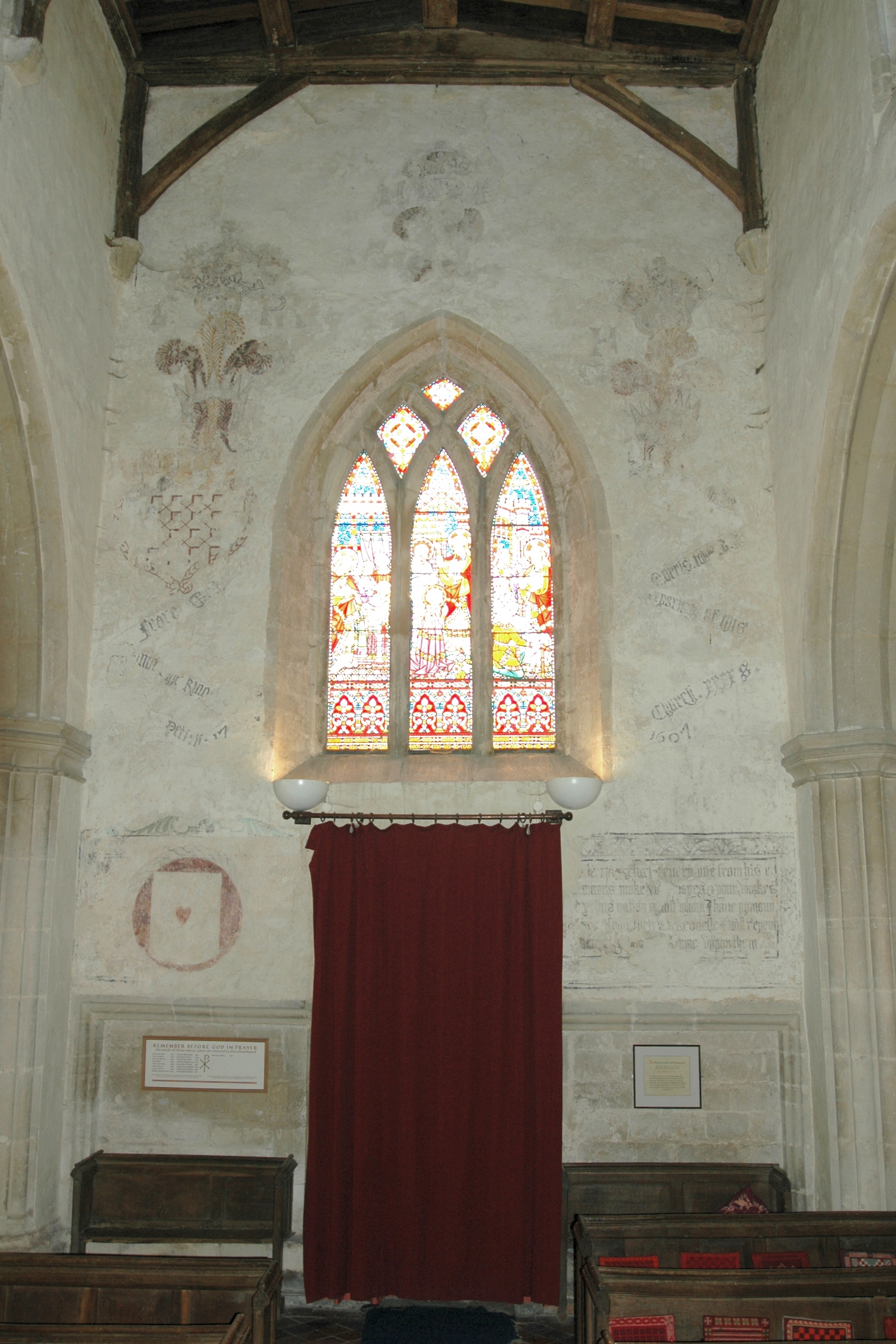
Parish church of the Assumption: west end of nave with 18th-century paintings of Prince of Wales' feathers.

Bernard of St. Valery had a deer park at Beckley, the earliest known record of which dates from 1175 or 76. His son Thomas had it enclosed with a stone wall, built between 1192 and 97. In 1229 the Earl of Cornwall had the park stocked with deer and a deer-leap built. When the manor reverted to the Crown, Beckley Park became a Royal deer park. When Edward I was fighting the First War of Scottish Independence (1296 onwards) he ordered the park's keeper to repair its wall, pale and ditch.

The park had the rounded outline characteristic of many medieval deer parks, and was about 1.25 miles (2 km) across in each direction. It lay just east of the present village, where the south-western part of Thomas of St. Valery's park pale still survives. The eastern line of the pale now forms the parish boundary with Horton-cum-Studley and the southern line of the pale forms part of the parish boundary with Stanton St John. Otmoor Lane, leading from the village to the moor, follows what may have been the northwestern line of the pale. On a number of occasions poachers raided the park: for example in 1264–65 during the Second Barons' War and again in 1276 and 1281.Oxford University students were constant poachers: so much so that in 1413 the Crown threatened to deprive the university of its royal privileges.

The Earl of Cornwall had a hunting lodge built near the centre of the park, at the foot of the hill overlooking Otmoor to the north. It was fortified with three concentric, rectangular moats. The lodge no longer stands but its moats survive. After Sir John Williams bought the manor of Beckley he had the present Tudor house built, just outside the moats and adjoining the outermost one. Jacobean panelling was added to the parlour in the 17th century but otherwise the house remains very largely as it was built. It is a Grade I listed building. Beckley Park is the home of Amanda Feilding and the main headquarters of her Beckley Foundation, which is doing research on the benefits of certain types of drugs, including cannabis and LSD. The property is not open to the public.

By 1628 the deer park had been broken up and enclosed as farmland. The farmstead of Beckley Park Farm (or Lower Park Farm) was the Tudor house Sir John Williams had built. The farmstead of Upper Park Farm is on the upper part of the hill, beside the springs whose stream fed the moats of the former lodge and then flowed across Otmoor to join the River Ray. That of Middle Park Farm is between the two, beside former fish ponds that the stream fed before reaching the lodge.

== Parish church ==
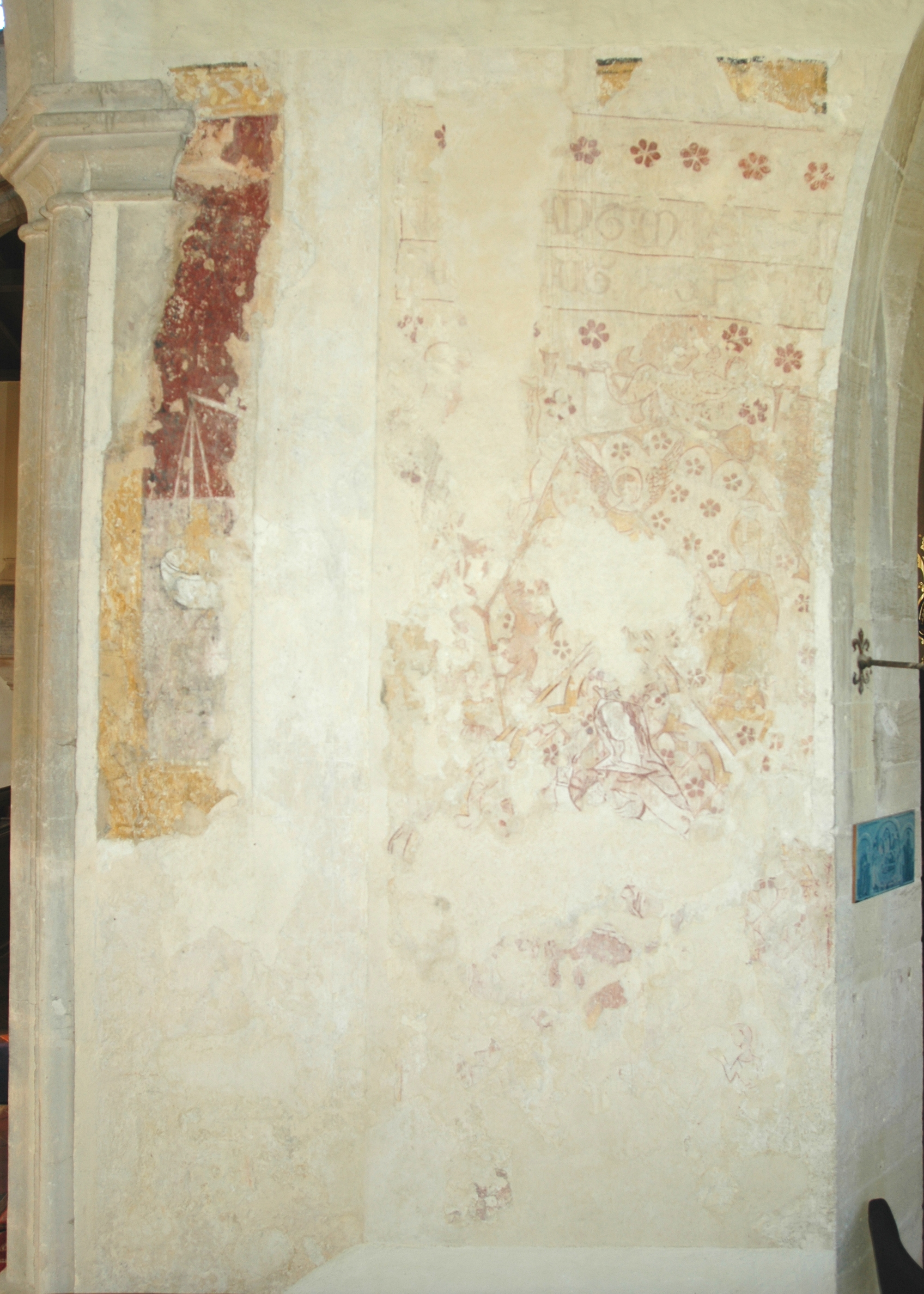
Parish church of the Assumption: 14th-century wall painting of the Virgin Mary and the Infant Christ in the Lady Chapel, partly overlaid with 15th-century wall painting.

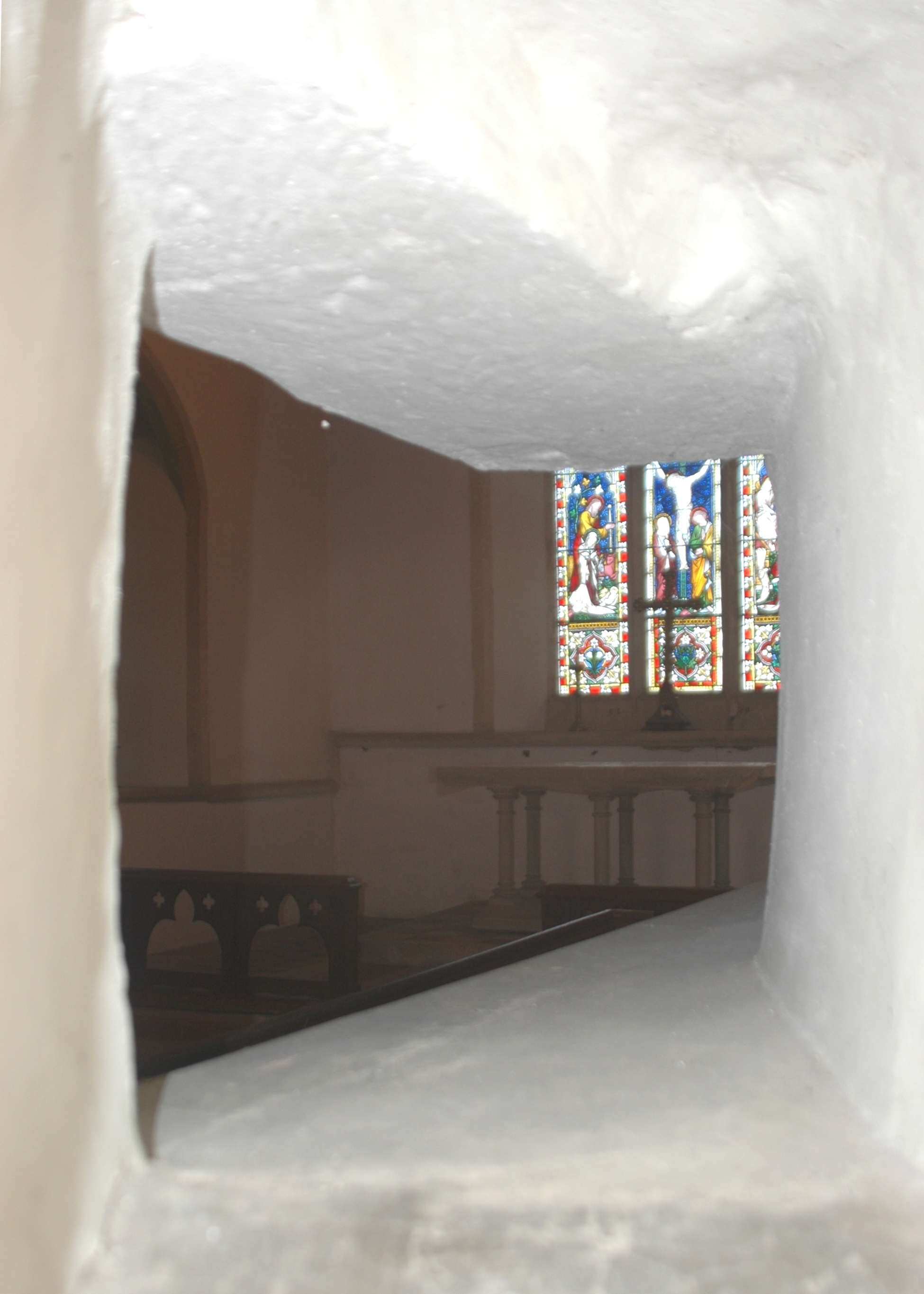
Parish church of the Assumption: hagioscope to the chancel

The Church of England parish church of the Assumption of the Blessed Virgin Mary was originally Norman, but was rebuilt in the 14th and 15th centuries. The interior has a number of 14th- and 15th-century wall paintings including a Virgin and Child, an Annunciation of the Blessed Virgin Mary, the weighing of souls, the torments of the damned and 15th-century paintings of Saint Peter, Saint Paul and a Doom. By 1552 the tower had four large bells and the church also had a Sanctus bell. The Sanctus bell has been lost but the tower bells have been renewed and increased to the present ring of five. Richard Keene of Woodstock cast the treble bell in 1650 and the third bell in 1654. Richard III Chandler of Drayton Parslow, Buckinghamshire cast the fourth bell in 1705 and Henry III Bagley of Chacombe, Northamptonshire cast the second bell in 1707, possibly at his foundry at Witney. Mears and Stainbank of the Whitechapel Bell Foundry cast the present tenor bell in 1881. For technical reasons, the bells cannot ring.

The rectory and advowson of Beckley evolved into a second manor, which was bought by the Shillingford alias Izard family in 1568. Memorials in Beckley church to the family include one dedicated to John Izard, 'Spanish merchant,' who died in 1694. Dorothy Izard of this family married the Rev. Nicholas Levet, priest of Westbourne, West Sussex and fellow of Balliol College, Oxford, who is buried in the chancel of the parish church. The Izard family seem to have sold the rectory to the Duke of Bedford. The Shillingford alias Izard family also held the nearby manor of Charlton-on-Otmoor.

== Saint Domnanuerdh ==
In the early Middle Ages Beckley was reputedly the home of Saint Domnanuerdh, a Saxon saint known only from the Hagiography list of John Leland.

== Amenities ==
Beckley Church of England Primary School is a Church of England primary school and a village hall. There is a community-owned pub, The Abingdon Arms, which is owned by Beckley & Area Community Benefit Society.

== In fiction ==
A fictional novel entitled 'Becoming Hannah' by British author, Nigel Cooper is set in the village of Beckley.

== See also ==
- Beckley Park

== Sources ==
- Emery, Frank (1974). The Oxfordshire Landscape. The Making of the English Landscape. London: Hodder & Stoughton. pp. 89. ISBN 0-340-04301-6.
- Hoskins, W.G. (1985) [1955]. The Making of the English Landscape. Penguin Books. p. 94. ISBN 0-14-007964-5.
- Lobel, Mary D, ed. (1957). A History of the County of Oxford: Volume 5: Bullingdon Hundred. Victoria County History. pp. 56–76.
- Long, E.T. (1972). "Medieval Wall Paintings in Oxfordshire Churches". Oxoniensia. XXXVII. Oxfordshire Architectural and Historical Society: 91.
- Sherwood, Jennifer; Pevsner, Nikolaus (1974). Oxfordshire. The Buildings of England. Harmondsworth: Penguin Books. pp. 447–449. ISBN 0-14-071045-0.
