= Alfred Mardon Mowbray =

British architect (1849–1915)

- Born: 1849
- Died: 1915 (aged 65–66)
- Occupation: Architect
- Buildings: SS Mary and John parish church, Oxford; St Michael and All Angels church, Oxford

Alfred Mardon Mowbray (1849–1915) was an English Gothic Revival architect who practiced in Oxford and Eastbourne from the 1860s to the 1900s.

== Career ==
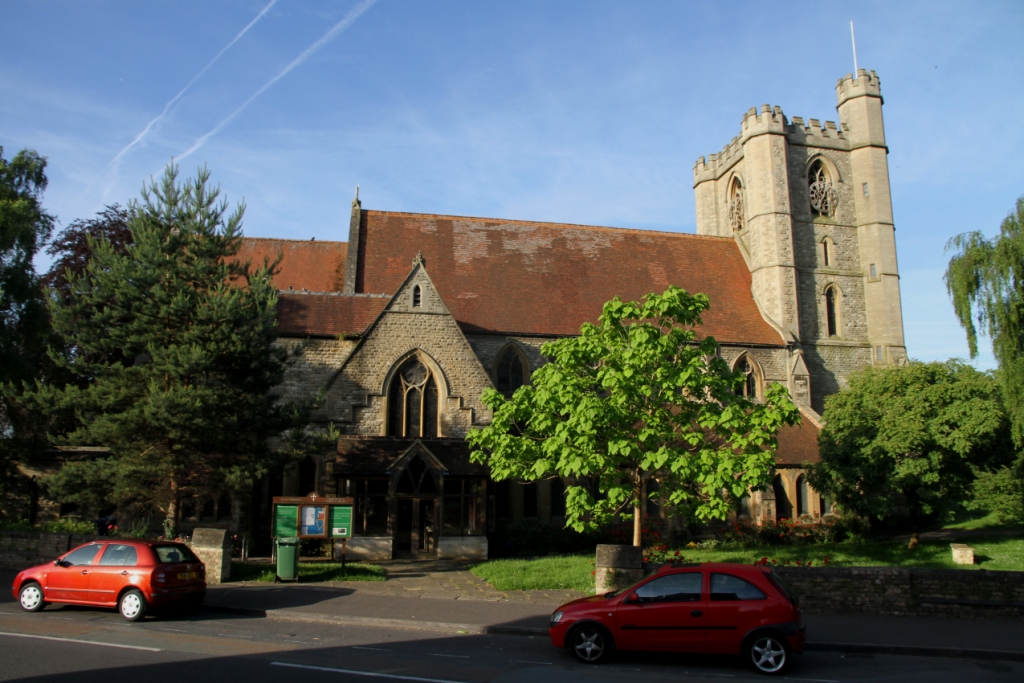
SS Mary and John parish church, Oxford

Mowbray was articled to Charles Buckeridge between 1865 and 1870, and between 1870 and 1872 was an assistant to a number of architects including Joseph Clarke and JW Hugall. He practiced in Oxford from 1872 until 1877, and then in Eastbourne until after 1880. He was made a Fellow of the Royal Institute of British Architects in 1881 but his membership lapsed in 1896. He had returned to Oxford by 1890, where he lived in Iffley Road.

== Work ==
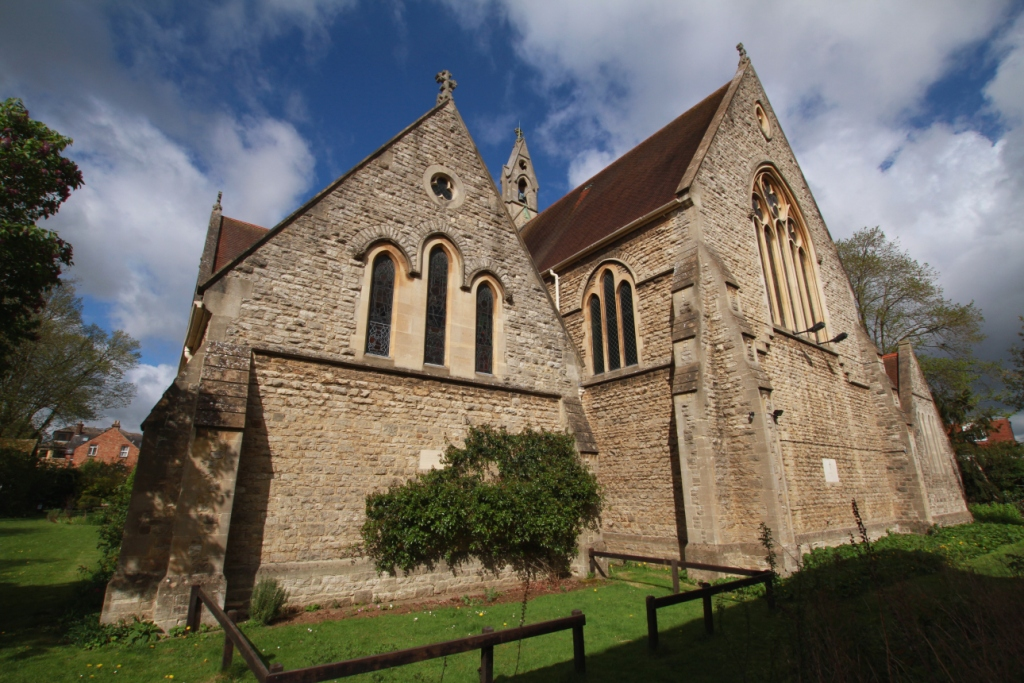
St Michael and All Angels parish church, Summertown, Oxford

- SS Mary and John parish church, Cowley Road, Oxford, 1875–1883 and tower 1892–1893
- St Helen's parish church, Berrick Salome: restoration and alterations, 1891
- St Helen's parish church, Albury: restoration, 1891
- Mission Church, Murcott, 1895
- St Katherine's School, Wantage, 1897
- St Ebbe's parish church, Oxford: upper part of tower, 1904
- St Michael and All Angels parish church, Summertown, Oxford, 1909 (unfinished)

== Sources ==
- Brodie, Antonia; Felstead, Alison; Franklin, Jonathan; Pinfield, Leslie; Oldfield, Jane, eds. (2001). Directory of British Architects 1834–1914, L–Z. London & New York: Continuum. p. 224. ISBN 0-8264-5514-X.
- Pevsner, Nikolaus (1966). Berkshire. The Buildings of England. Harmondsworth: Penguin Books. p. 254.
- Sherwood, Jennifer; Pevsner, Nikolaus (1974). Oxfordshire. The Buildings of England. Harmondsworth: Penguin Books. ISBN 0-14-071045-0.
- Tyack, Geoffrey (1998). Oxford An Architectural Guide. Oxford & New York: Oxford University Press. p. 240. ISBN 0-19-817423-3.
