= Otmoor RSPB reserve =

Nature reserve in Britain

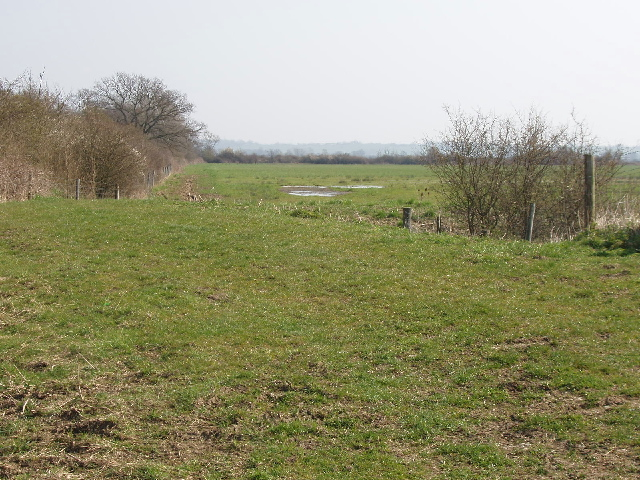
- RSPB reserve, Otmoor
- Interactive map of Otmoor RSPB reserve
- Location: Oxfordshire, England
- Coordinates: 51°48′52″N 01°11′12″W
- Established: 1997
- Operator: Royal Society for the Protection of Birds

Otmoor RSPB Reserve is a nature reserve, managed by the RSPB, between Beckley and Oddington, within the wider area of Otmoor, in Oxfordshire, England. The reserve was established in 1997 and restored large areas of marshland from what had previously been farmland. The RSPB reserve covers 485 hectares (1,200 acres).

The site is a popular birdwatching spot, and includes several hides that look out over different habitats, including the wetland watch. The site includes several walking trails, connecting with the network of public walking trails and bridleways in the Otmoor area that connect the local villages that surround the reserve. Large swathes of the land is seasonally flooded, and areas of the reserve are therefore not accessible to visitors year-round.

Otmoor is primarily wetland and in winter provides a home to thousands of waterfowl. It is increasingly becoming a wintering ground for thousands of wildfowl and waders. Over a thousand wigeon and teal have been recorded, while birds of prey such as merlins and peregrines are regularly seen. Large areas of Otmoor have benefited from extensive agriculture using traditional methods, resulting in good numbers of songbirds that are otherwise declining in the UK, including bullfinch, skylark, reed bunting, grasshopper warbler and European turtle dove.

Spring and autumn both produce good numbers of passage migrants, including waders in the spring and common redstarts and whinchats in the autumn. The best time for marsh harriers is late April to mid-May. There are good numbers of breeding waders and recent RSPB work has increased the number of pairs of northern lapwings and common redshanks. The site has become well known for murmurations (roosting displays) of starlings in winter.

Bitterns were recorded as breeding in 2016.

A diverse selection of other wildlife has been recorded at the reserve. Many rare plants have been reported from the area, including fen violet, downy-fruited sedge, dyer's greenweed, heath spotted orchid and green-winged orchid. The butterflies include three species of hairstreak: the black, brown and White-letter in the hedgerows, and in the meadows there are populations of marbled white and orange tip. Odonata include hairy dragonfly and variable damselfly. Mammals living on the reserve include the brown hare, European badger and Reeves's muntjac.
