= Otmoor =

Wetland and grassland area in Oxfordshire, England

Coordinates: 51°49′19″N 1°10′47″W

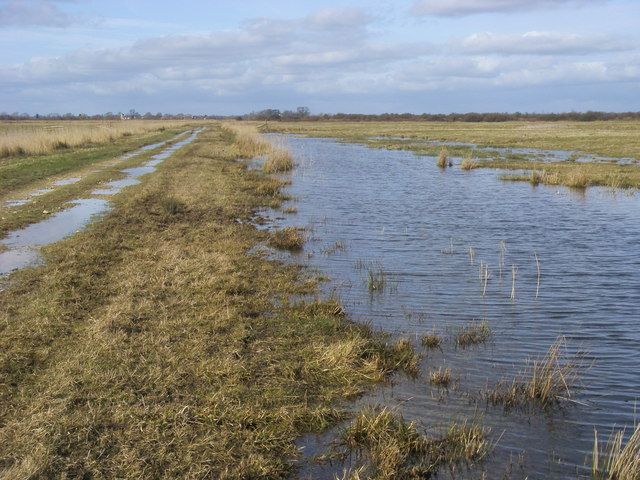
Otmoor

Otmoor or Ot Moor is an area of wetland and wet grassland in Oxfordshire, England, located halfway between Oxford and Bicester. It is about 60 metres (200 ft) above sea level, and has an area of nearly 400 hectares (990 acres).

It is encircled by the "Seven Towns" of Otmoor: Beckley, Noke, Oddington, Charlton-on-Otmoor, Fencott, Murcott and Horton-cum-Studley.

Part of it is a nature reserve, RSPB Otmoor, which adjoins a Ministry of Defence firing range, which is part of a Site of Special Scientific Interest.

== History ==
Bisected north–south by the Roman Road between Alchester and Dorchester-on-Thames, its name is derived from the Old English for "Otta's Fen".

=== Enclosure ===
Otmoor Drainage and Allotments Act 1815
- Act of Parliament
- Parliament of the United Kingdom
- Long title: An Act for draining and allotting Otmoor, in the County of Oxford.
- Citation: 55 Geo. 3. c. c

Dates
- Royal assent: 12 July 1815

Text of statute as originally enacted

Watered by the River Ray, it was until the early 19th century unenclosed marshland, and regularly flooded in winter. An inclosure act was passed, the Otmoor Drainage and Allotments Act 1815 (55 Geo. 3. c. c), under which the area was extensively drained. This disadvantaged the local farmers and led to civil disturbances known as the Otmoor Riots of 1829–30.

=== Military range ===
In 1920 the Royal Air Force acquired Otmoor for use as a bombing range. Part of the moor remains in military use as a rifle range, and is also a large part of Otmoor Site of Special Scientific Interest (SSSI).

=== Motorway to nature reserve ===
The semi-wetland landscape provides habitat for many rare species of birds and butterflies. These were threatened in 1980 by a government proposal for the route of the M40 motorway to cross Otmoor. Opposition to the motorway was led by Friends of the Earth and included the "Alice's Meadow" campaign. The government eventually adopted an alternative route.

Since 1997 a large part of Otmoor has been made an RSPB nature reserve, with large areas of land being returned to marshland. Immediately east of the RSPB reserve is Otmoor SSSI.
