= Marsh Gibbon =

Village in Buckinghamshire, England

Coordinates: 51.9029°N 1.0600°W

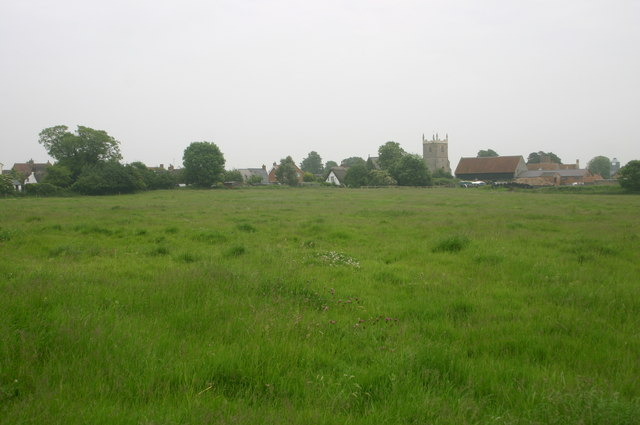
- A view of the village

- Location within Buckinghamshire
- Population: 969 (2011 Census)
- OS grid reference: SP645235
- Unitary authority: Buckinghamshire
- Ceremonial county: Buckinghamshire
- Region: South East
- Country: England
- Sovereign state: United Kingdom
- Post town: Bicester
- Postcode district: OX27
- Dialling code: 01869
- Police: Thames Valley
- Fire: Buckinghamshire
- Ambulance: South Central
- UK Parliament: Mid Buckinghamshire
- Website: Marsh Gibbon Parish Council

Marsh Gibbon is a village and civil parish in Buckinghamshire, England. It is close to the A41 and the border with Oxfordshire about 4 miles (6.4 km) east of Bicester.

In the centre of the village the buildings are largely built of local stone, and roofed in tiles, slate and thatch. Many of which are listed buildings. The centre and east of the village are designated as the Marsh Gibbon Conservation Area, including the Greyhound pub, The Plough, the Manor House and the Church.

In the south of the parish, formerly part of the ancient Bernwood Forest, the landscape and habitat has been designated as the Upper Ray Meadows Nature Reserve, while Long Herdon Meadow is a national Site of Special Scientific Interest.

== History ==
The village name comes from the English word 'Marsh', describing the typical state of land in the area due to the high water table of the Aylesbury Vale district. The affix 'Gibbon' derives from the family name 'Gibwen', the Lords of the manor in the twelfth century. In manorial rolls of 1292 the village was recorded as Mersh Gibwyne, though earlier (in 1086) it was known simply as Merse.

One of the two entries in the Domesday Book for the village is unique in having the only comment of any kind, namely "Graviter et miserabiliter". In translation the complete entry reads:

Ailric held it in King Edward's time but now holds in farm of William heavily and miserably.

Ailric's manor, now named Westbury Manor, was given by King Edward IV to the Company of Cooks in London, though it was sold in 1883 to Thomas H. Phipps, whose family still owns the manor.

The larger manor was the property of the abbey of Grestein in Normandy, France. In 1348 the lands of the Abbey of Grestein, including Marsh Gibbon and the manors of Ramridge in Hampshire and Conock in Wiltshire, were seized by Edward the Black Prince during the Hundred Year’s War, as ransom for the capture of Jean de Melun, Comte de Tancarville during the Crecy campaign. He in turn assigned these and other manors in payment of debt to Tideman de Lymbergh of the Hanseatic League, who in 1350 by licence of the king demised them to Michael and Thomas de la Pole, sons of William de la Pole

In 1442 Michael de la Pole’s descendant William Duke of Suffolk granted these three manors to the alms-house trust founded by himself and his wife Alice Chaucer at Ewelme in Oxfordshire. The Ewelme Almshouse Trust has held these lands ever since.

In 1617 James I granted the Mastership of the Ewelme Trust to the Regius Professor of Medicine at the University of Oxford in whose hands it remains today. Its manor house is Elizabethan and situated just south of the thirteenth-century church and about 200 metres from Westbury Manor to the West.

Following a skirmish at Hillesden in 1645, the parliamentarian troops were garrisoned in Marsh Gibbon before marching on to Boarstall. The ground works of their encampment were visible in the field to northwest of the Ewelme manor house but have since been flattened in the late 1950s.

In 1858 Sir Henry Acland was appointed to the post of Regius Professor of Medicine and Master of the Trust, a post he retained until 1894. He was appointed to the Royal Sanitary Commission on public health in 1869, and took a great interest in the welfare and sanitation of rural villages like Marsh Gibbon. In order to improve the distressed condition of village housing, he had 28 new stone houses built for residents in the period 1860-1880 – each had half an acre of land, an earth closet and a pigsty. Along with the houses, a dispensary was introduced and a reading room started. At the time all water in the village was supplied by wooden pipes from the Stump Well, which can still be seen in the field behind the manor. In 1884, Acland published Health in the Village (1864), an influential book based on his experience in Marsh Gibbon and presenting "a broad view of the circumstances most favourable to the good order and happiness of a rural population" – it includes a map of the village and a plan of the houses that were built, describing them as model labourer's cottages.

== Geography ==
The landscape is predominantly pastoral, with significant areas of archaeological and biological interest. The geology of the area comprises cornbrash limestone to the west, and Kellaway beds and Oxford Clay to the east and south of the parish. To the east of the village is the hamlet of Little Marsh and to the south east is the hamlet of Summerstown.

== Amenities ==
The parish church of Marsh Gibbon is dedicated to St Mary the Virgin. Robert Clavering, who later became the Bishop of Peterborough, was the rector from 1719. The village has two pubs, the Greyhound and the Plough.

North of the village and just outside Poundon, is Tower Hill Business Park. This was previously Poundon Hill Wireless Station, a FCO/MI6 signals intelligence station.

Marsh Gibbon Church of England School is a mixed, voluntary aided primary school, with approximately 140 pupils. It takes children from the age of four through to the age of eleven.
