= Oddington, Oxfordshire =

Village in Oxfordshire, England

Coordinates: 51.831°N 01.198°W

Oddington
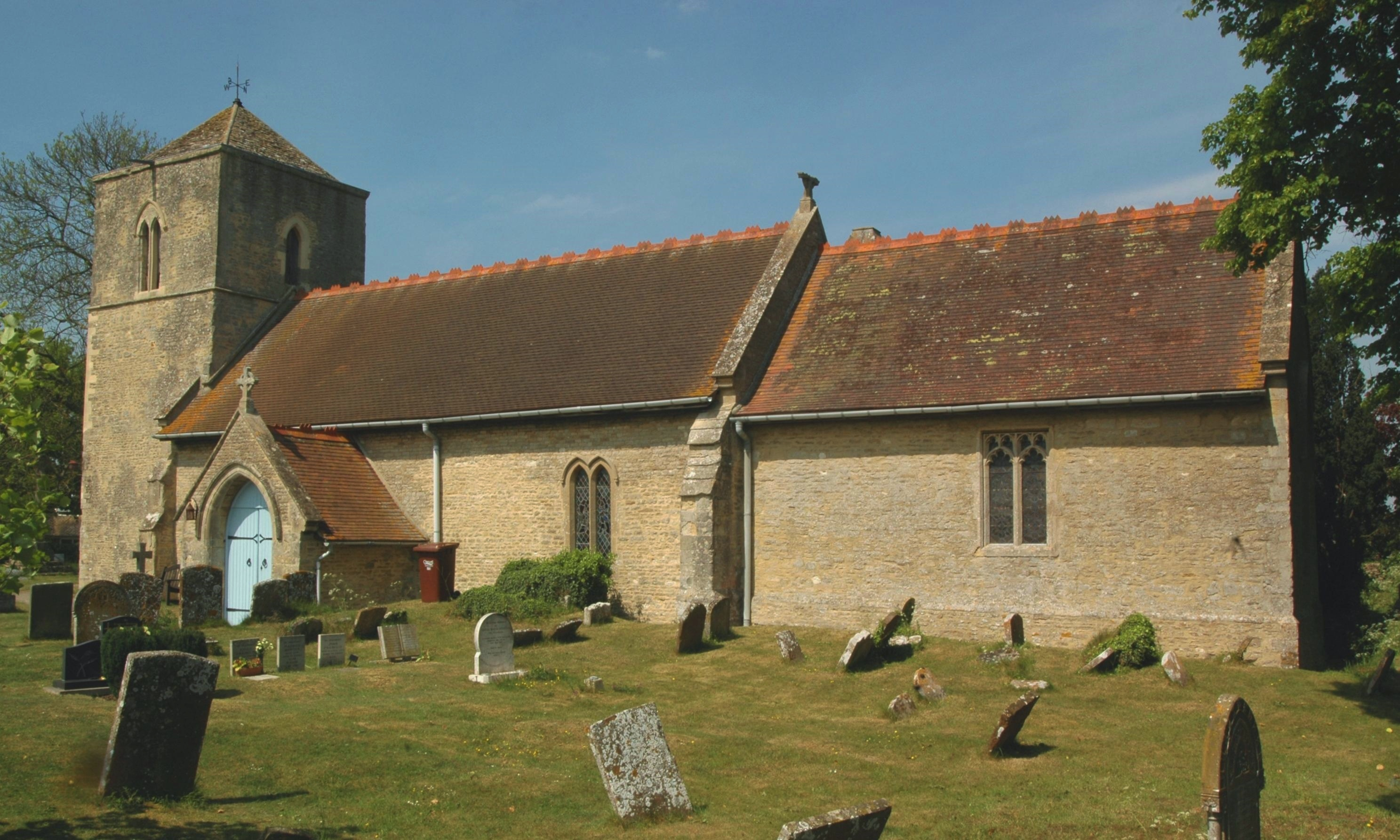
- St. Andrew's parish church from the south

- Location within Oxfordshire
- Area: 5.51 km^{2} (2.13 sq mi)
- Population: 129 (2011 Census)
  - Density: 23/km^{2} (60/sq mi)
- OS grid reference: SP5514
- Civil parish: Oddington
- District: Cherwell
- Shire county: Oxfordshire
- Region: South East
- Country: England
- Sovereign state: United Kingdom
- Post town: Kidlington
- Postcode district: OX5
- Dialling code: 01865
- Police: Thames Valley
- Fire: Oxfordshire
- Ambulance: South Central
- UK Parliament: Bicester and Woodstock

Oddington is a village and civil parish about 5 miles (8 km) south of Bicester in Oxfordshire, England. The village is close to the River Ray on the northern edge of Otmoor. The 2011 Census recorded the parish's population as 129.

== History ==
The toponym is derived from the Old English, possibly after the same person who gave his name to Otmoor.

== Parish church ==
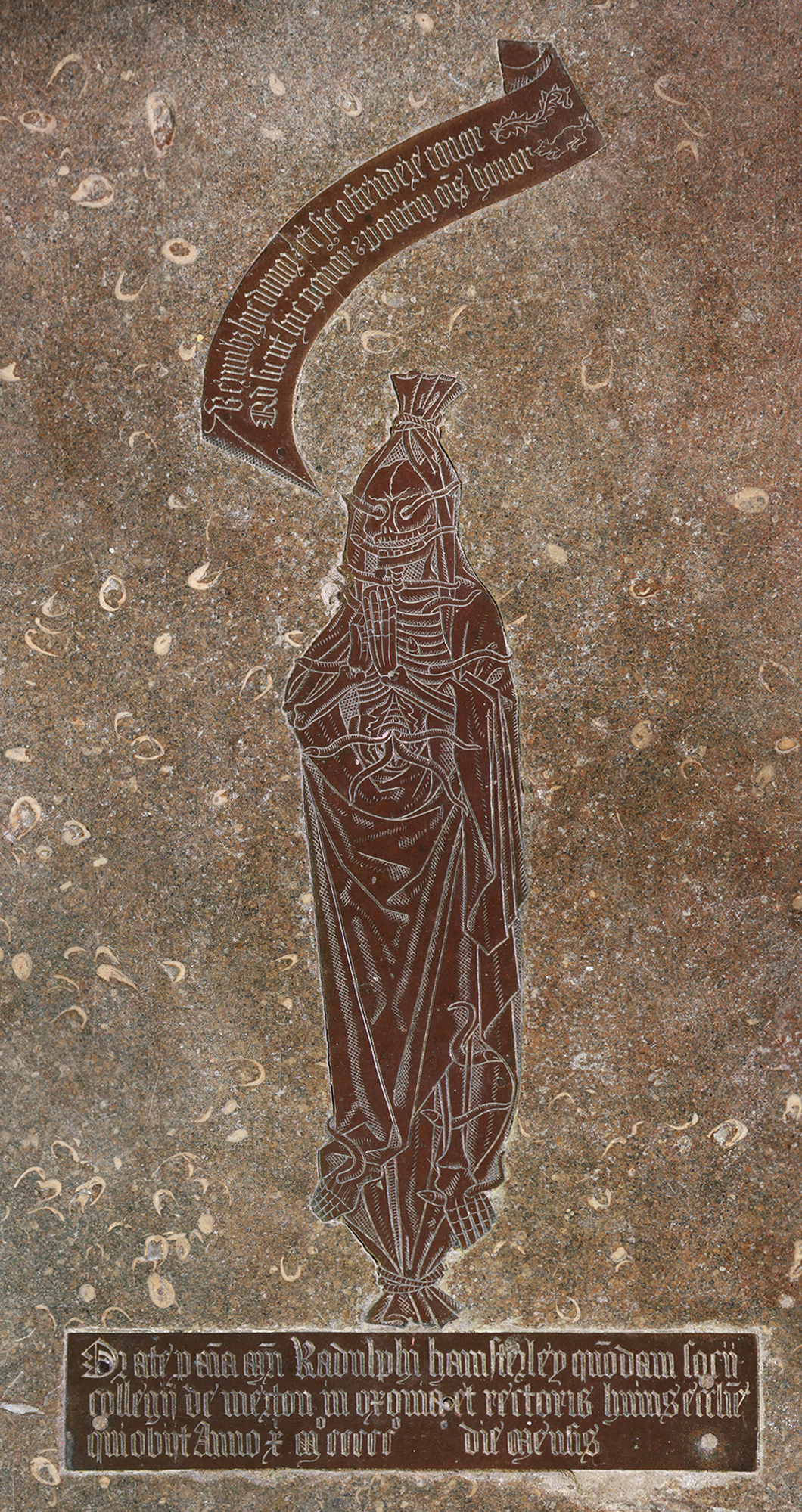
The monumental brass of Ralph Hamsterley (died 1518) at Oddington in Oxfordshire. Hamsterley was rector of Oddington and also warden of University College Oxford. This brass, which shows his body wrapped in a shroud being eaten by worms, was one of five identical brasses Hamsterley laid down before his death. Only one (at Oxford) was over his grave.

A mention of Oddington in a Papal bull written in 1146 suggests that the village had a parish church by the middle of the 12th century. The present Church of England parish church of Saint Andrew was built at the end of the 13th century and beginning of the 14th century. The buttresses of the nave are late 13th century, and the font is probably also from that century. Some features of the chancel are early 14th century, but in 1821 the chancel was demolished and rebuilt.

Between 1884 and 1886, the church was heavily restored under the direction of the architect E.G. Bruton. The bell tower and the north wall of the chancel were rebuilt, the vestry and north aisle were added and several windows inserted. Inside the church are two unusual monuments. The first is an early 16th-century monumental brass in memory of Ralph Hamsterley, who had been parish priest and died in 1518. It is a cadaver monument, showing his corpse in its burial shroud, which is a style unusual for monumental brasses in England. Elsewhere, there is an example from the late 15th century, also in memory of a parish priest, in the parish church at Lytchett Matravers in Dorset.

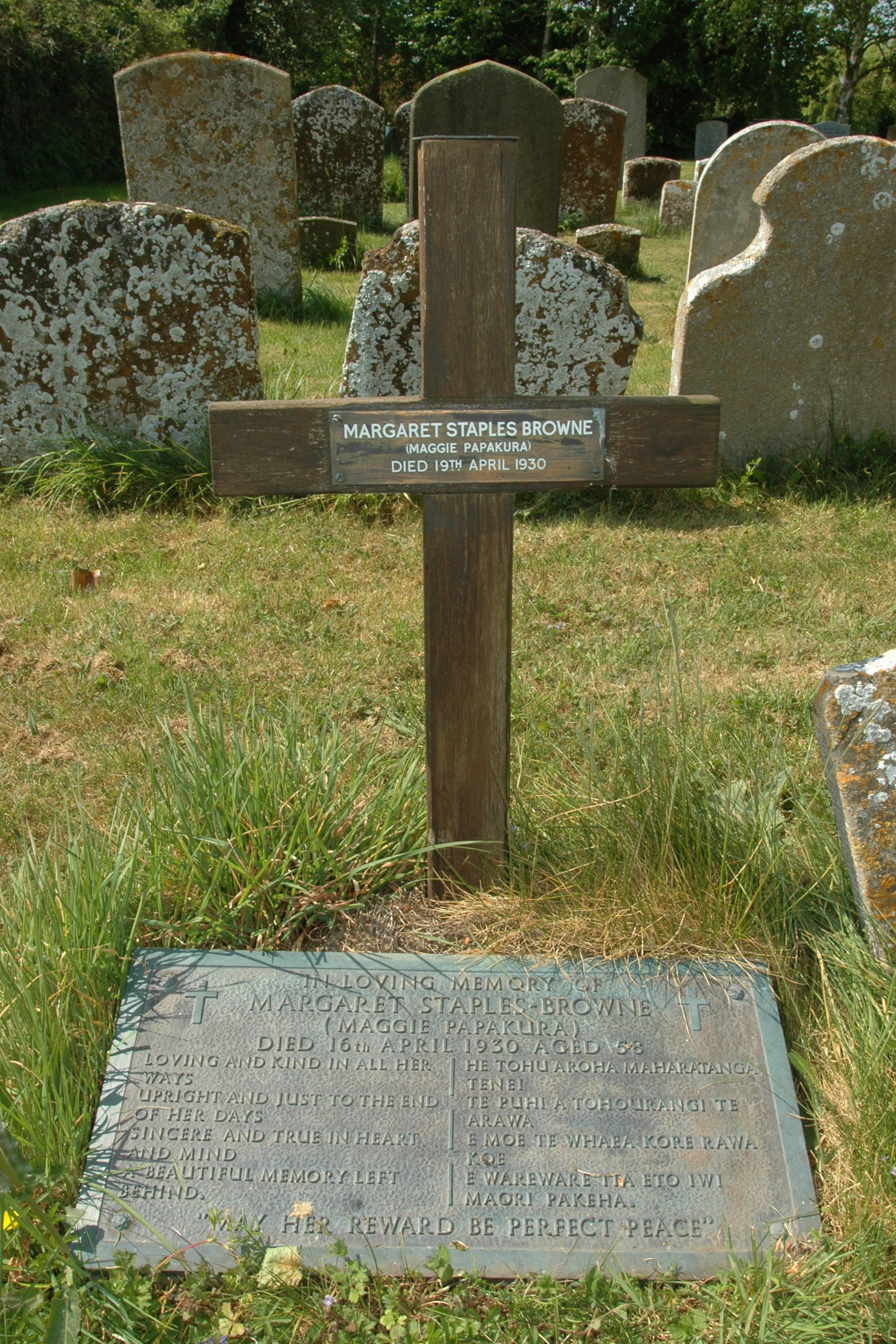
Grave of Margaret Staples Browne in St Andrew's churchyard. Browne was a Māori princess whose maiden name was Papakura

The second unusual monument is a large pietà at the west end of the nave. It is decorated with Māori totems in memory of Māori servicemen killed in the First World War. The tower has three bells. The treble was cast in 1609, but the bellfounder has not been identified. James Keene of Woodstock cast the tenor in 1626. Thomas I Mears of the Whitechapel Bell Foundry cast the youngest of the three bells in 1804. The ring was converted for chiming in 2012. There is also a Sanctus bell, cast by an unknown founder in about 1614, but it is cracked.

Gilbert Sheldon held the living of the parish from 1636. Sheldon already held the living of Hackney, received that of Ickford, Buckinghamshire at about the same time as that of Oddington, and at some time also the living of Newington, Oxfordshire. After the Restoration of the Monarchy, Sheldon was consecrated Archbishop of Canterbury in 1663. The Syriac scholar William Cureton was curate of Oddington for a time in the 19th century. St. Andrew's is now part of the Church of England Benefice of the Ray Valley.

== Transport ==
=== Railway ===
The nearest railway station is Islip, 1 1/2 miles (2 km) from Oddington. It is served by Chiltern Railways trains to London Marylebone via High Wycombe and to Oxford via Oxford Parkway. The Buckinghamshire Railway between Bletchley and Oxford passes through Charlton parish and was completed in 1851. The London and North Western Railway took it over in 1879 and opened Oddington Halt at Oddington Crossing, 1 mile (1.6 km) northwest of the village, in 1905. The 1923 Grouping made the L&NWR part of the new London, Midland and Scottish Railway, which closed Oddington Halt in 1926. The LMS was nationalised as part of British Railways in 1948, which ended passenger services in 1967 and reduced the line to single track. Oxfordshire County Council got BR to reopen the line in 1987 and Islip station in 1988. From 2014 to 2016, Network Rail rebuilt the railway as a 100 mph (160 km/h) main line linked to the Chiltern Main Line by a junction at Bicester.

=== Bus ===
Charlton-on-Otmoor Services bus route 94 provides Oddington and neighbouring villages with a very limited Monday to Saturday service between Bicester and Oxford via Arncott and Islip. The H5 bus ("Stagecoach") runs hourly on weekdays only between Bicester and the John Radcliffe Hospital in Headington, Oxford, and will stop at the Charlton-on-Otmoor turn about one mile away.

== Sources ==
- Lobel, Mary D., ed. (1959). A History of the County of Oxford: Volume 6. Victoria County History. pp. 276–285.
- Sherwood, Jennifer; Pevsner, Nikolaus (1974). Oxfordshire. The Buildings of England. Harmondsworth: Penguin Books. p. 730. ISBN 0-14-071045-0.
