= River Ray =

River in Oxfordshire and Buckinghamshire, England

Coordinates: 51.8197°N 1.2423°W

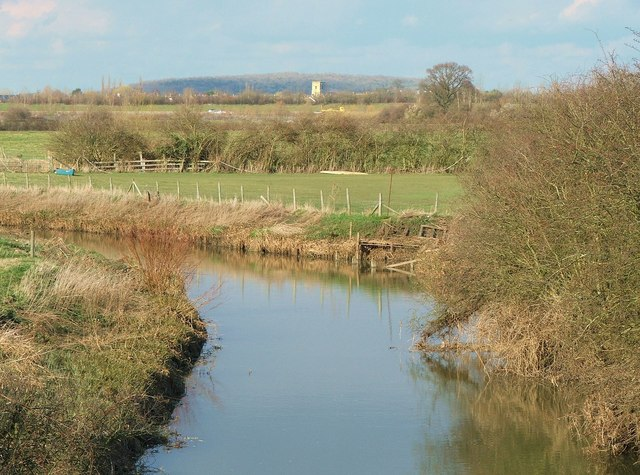
The River Ray near Charlton-on-Otmoor

The River Ray is a tributary of the River Cherwell in south east England. It rises at Quainton Hill, Buckinghamshire and flows west through flat countryside for around 25 km (16 mi) to meet the Cherwell at Islip in Oxfordshire.

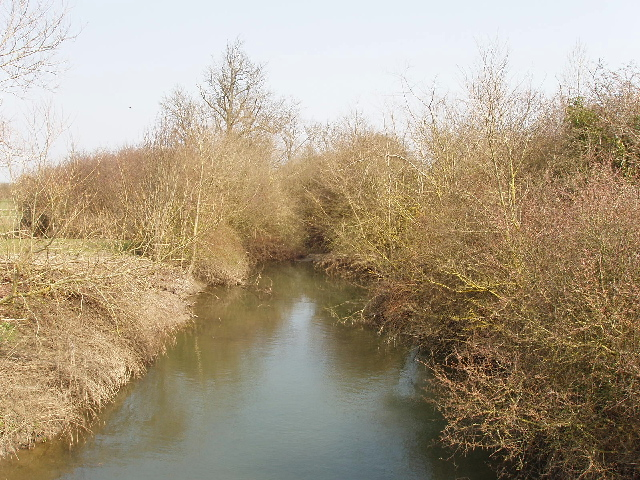
New River Ray at Oddington

The Ray's catchment area is sparsely populated, especially in its lower reaches as it flows through the Otmoor wetlands. In 1815 a channel was cut between Charlton-on-Otmoor and Oddington, known as the New River Ray, to divert much of the water flow around the northern and southern edge of Otmoor.

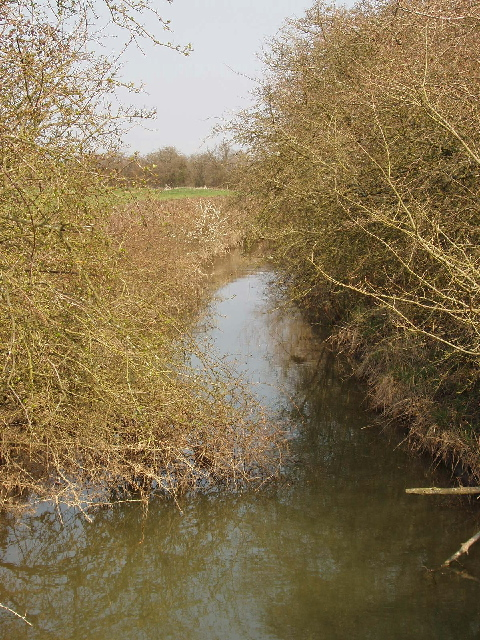
River Ray at Otmoor
