= Charlton-on-Otmoor =

Village and civil parish in Oxfordshire, England

Coordinates: 51.840°N 1.184°W

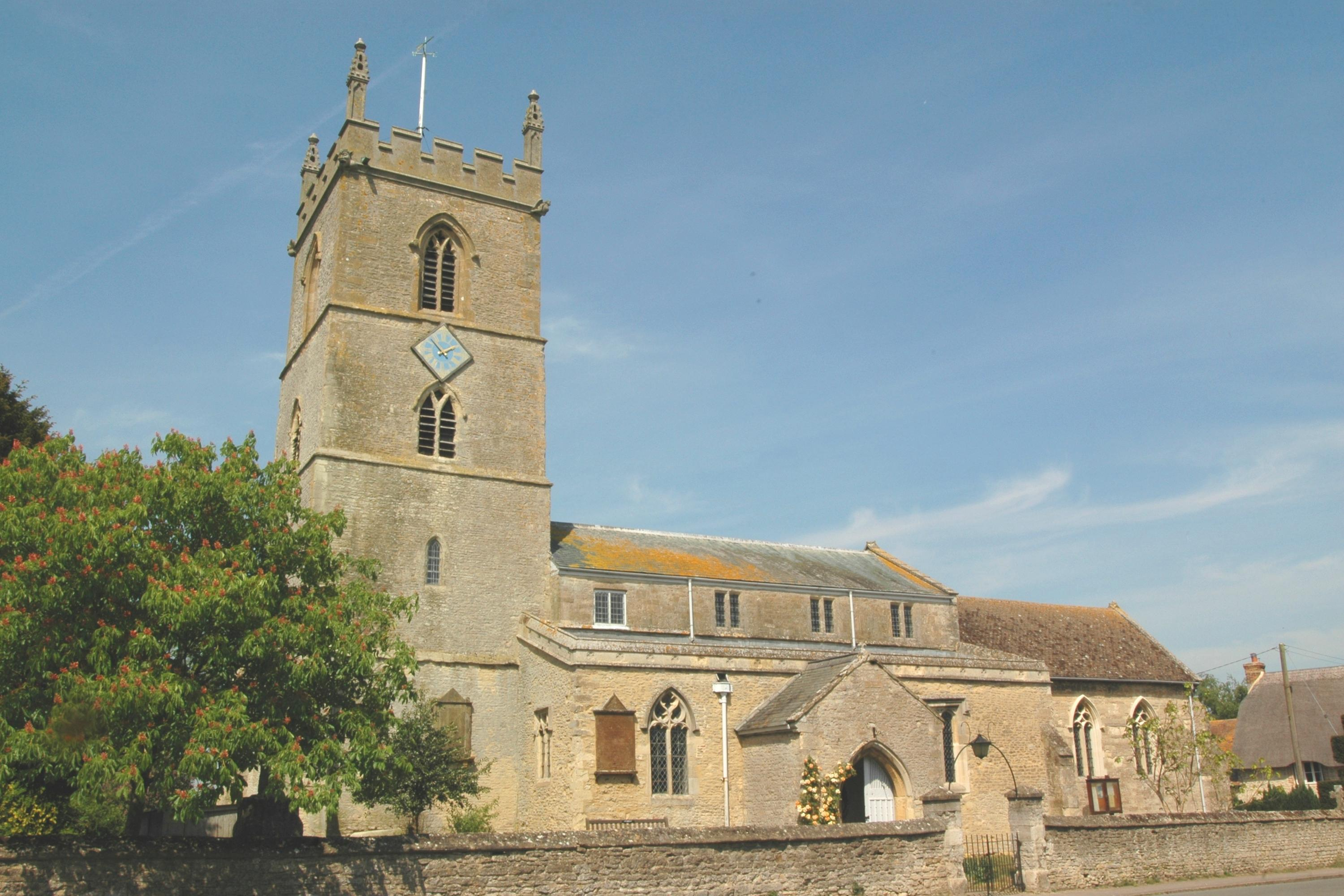
- St Mary the Virgin parish church

- Location within Oxfordshire
- Area: 3.31 km^{2} (1.28 sq mi)
- Population: 449 (2011 Census)
  - Density: 136/km^{2} (350/sq mi)
- OS grid reference: SP5615
- Civil parish: Charlton-on-Otmoor
- District: Cherwell
- Shire county: Oxfordshire
- Region: South East
- Country: England
- Sovereign state: United Kingdom
- Post town: Kidlington
- Postcode district: OX5
- Dialling code: 01865
- Police: Thames Valley
- Fire: Oxfordshire
- Ambulance: South Central
- UK Parliament: Bicester and Woodstock
- Website: Charlton on Otmoor Parish Council

Charlton-on-Otmoor is a village and civil parish about 9 miles (14 km) NE of Oxford and 6 miles (10 km) SW of Bicester in the Cherwell district, in the county of Oxfordshire, England. The village, one of the seven "towns" of Otmoor, is on the northern edge of the moor on a ridge of Cornbrash. The 2011 Census recorded the parish's population as 449.

== Toponym ==
The Domesday Book of 1086 records the place-name as Cerlentone. The chronicler Orderic Vitalis recorded that in 1081 it was spelt Cherlentona or Charlentone. In about 1190 a charter of Thame Abbey recorded it as Cherlenton and a charter of Sandford Preceptory recorded it as Cherleton'.

A Close Roll from 1245 records the name as Cherlton. The Hundred Rolls of 1278–79 record it as Cherleton' super Ottemor'. Assize rolls from 1285 variously record it as Cherlintone, Cheriltone, Chereltone and Chureltone.

An entry in the Calendar of Inquisitions Post Mortem for 1314 records it as Cherleton upon Ottemour and a Close Roll from 1315 records it as Cherleton on Ottemore. A Close Roll from 1336 records it as Charlynton. A deed from 1351 records it as Charleton. A feudal aid document from 1428 records it as Chorlton.

The name is derived from Old English and means "tūn of the ceorls".

== Manor ==
The manor of Charlton on Otmoor originated before the Norman Conquest, when it was held by Baldwin. By 1086 it had passed to Roger d’Ivry, connected by marriage to the powerful Grantmesnil family. Through this link, the manor was granted to St. Évroul Abbey in Normandy, and its overlordship descended through a complex line of noble families, including the earls of Leicester and Winchester, and later the Zouche and Lovel families. Mentions of overlordship fade after the mid-15th century.

The manor itself was managed for centuries by the alien priory of Ware, التابعة to St. Évroul, until its suppression in 1414. It then passed to Sheen Priory, a royal foundation of Henry V, and remained in ecclesiastical hands until the dissolution of the monasteries. During this period, the Poure family served as long-standing tenants from the 12th to early 15th centuries.

After the Dissolution, Charlton became Crown property and was used briefly as security for royal loans under Elizabeth I. It was then granted and sold through a series of private owners, including the Dudley, Shillingford, and Hatton families, with frequent mortgages and legal disputes reflecting financial pressures. By the late 17th century, it was sold to new owners, eventually passing to the Pope family.

In the 18th century, the manor was acquired by Thomas Cooper and then sold in 1753 to Sir Edward Turner. Whose descendents remained lords of the manor until 1874, though their direct involvement in local landholding was limited. The estate was subsequently sold, and by the early 20th century, any remaining manorial rights had effectively disappeared.

== Church and chapels ==
=== Church of England ===
Charlton had a parish church by the 11th century. The present Church of England parish church of Saint Mary the Virgin was a 13th-century Early English Gothic building but there were substantial Decorated Gothic alterations in the 14th century. The east window is slightly later, in the transitional style from Decorated to Perpendicular Gothic. Around the beginning of the 16th century the clerestory and a new roof were added to the nave, and a new window was added to the south aisle.

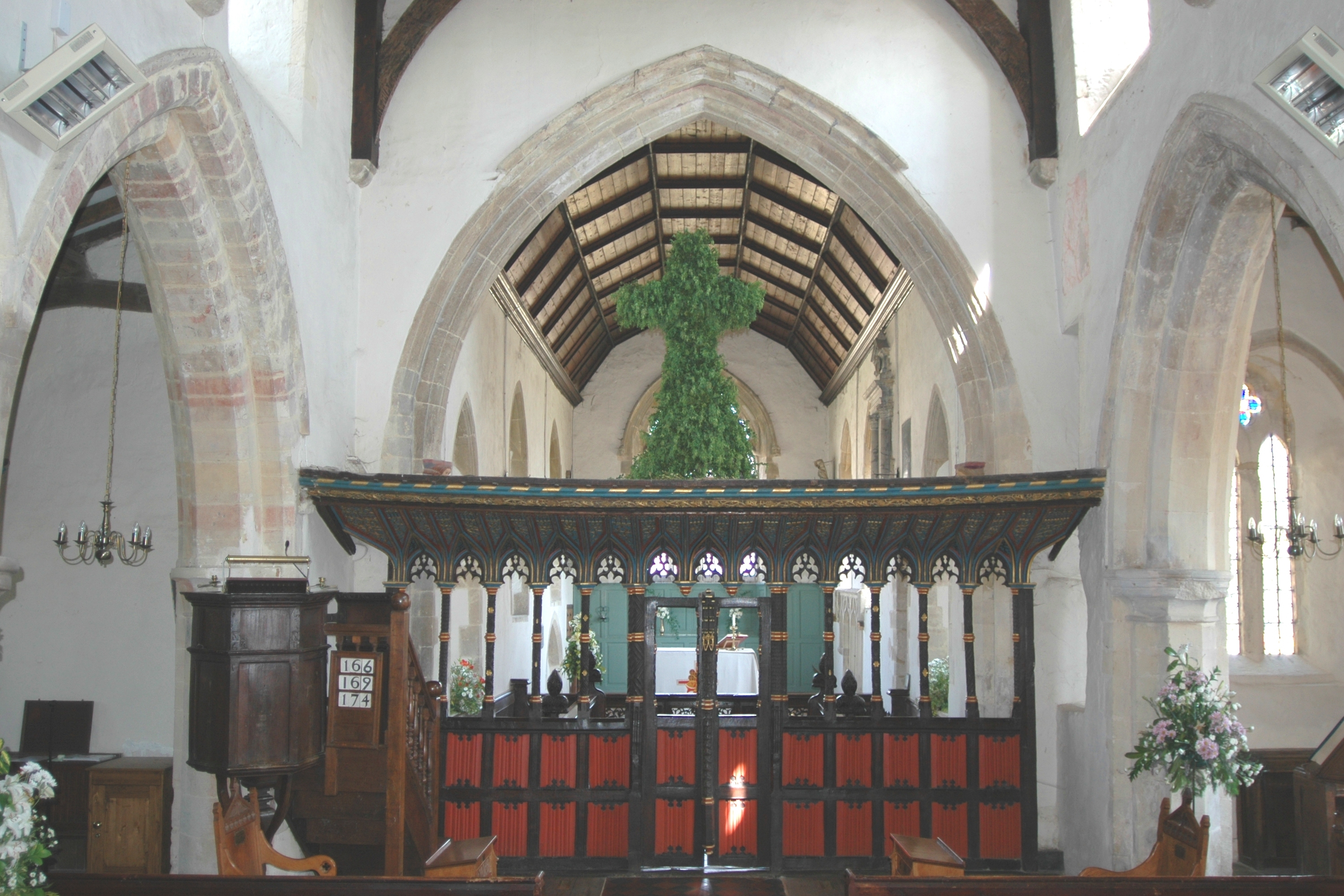
Garlanded rood on 16th-century screen in St Mary the Virgin parish church

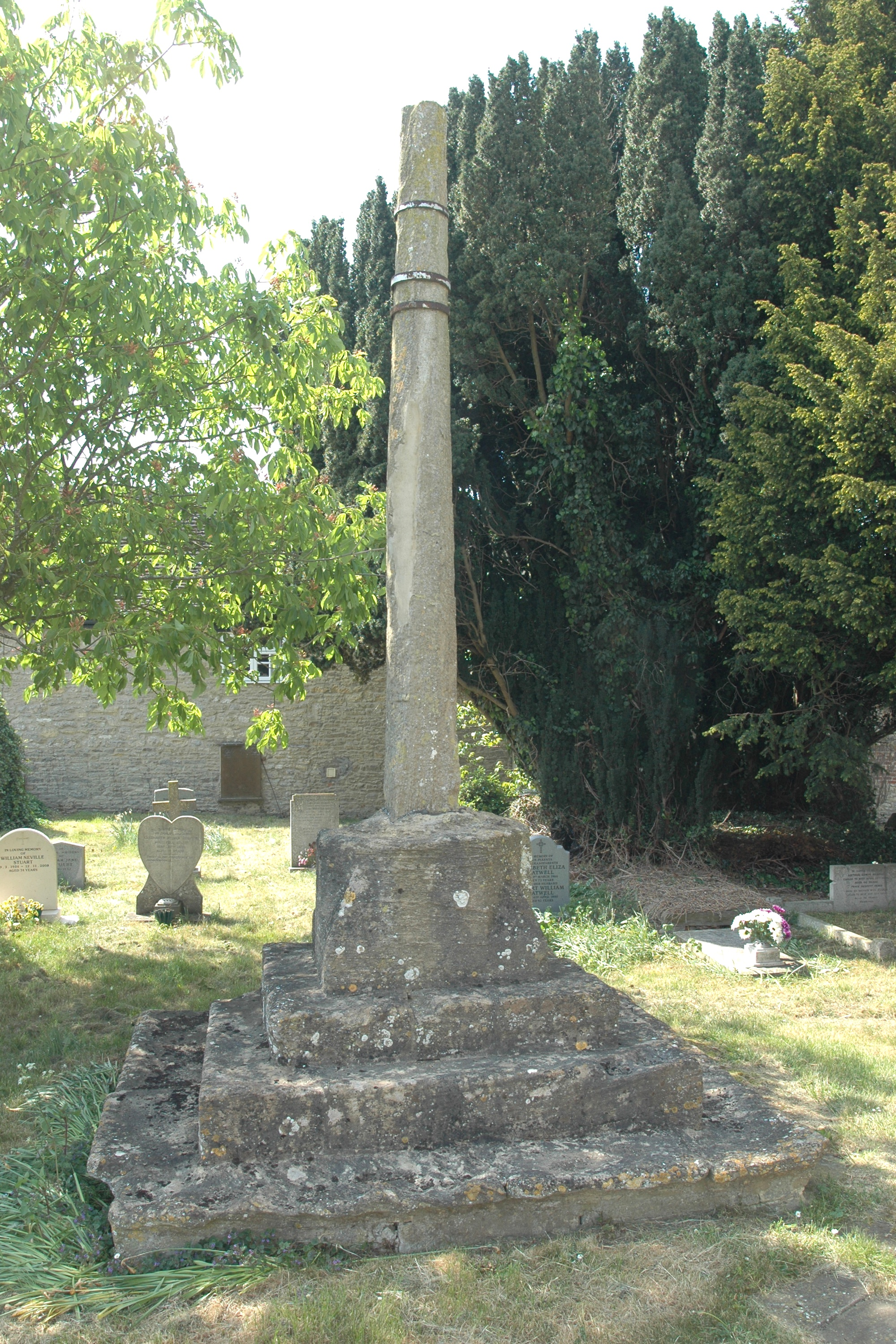
13th-century shaft cross in St Mary's churchyard

In the early 16th century the present rood screen and rood loft (for a crucifix between the chancel and nave) were added to the church. During the English Reformation Edward VI's injunctions of 1547 instructed that rood screens and lofts be removed from all churches in England and Wales. Charlton's screen and loft survived these injunctions, and in the 20th century the critic Jennifer Sherwood judged them "the finest and most complete in the county".

A tradition of garlanding the rood cross with flowers and box greenery on May Day and carrying it in procession around the parish also survived the Reformation and continues in modern times.

In 1846 the Gothic Revival architect GE Street re-roofed the church and restored the north wall. In 1889 the rood screen and loft were restored. St Mary's has never been over-restored, and its Decorated and Perpendicular mediaeval character has survived almost intact.

By 1553 the bell tower had five bells plus a Sanctus bell, but all have since been recast or replaced. Richard Keene, whose foundries included one at Woodstock, cast the two largest bells in 1681. Thomas Lester of the Whitechapel Bell Foundry cast another bell in 1746 and Matthew II Bagley of Chacombe, Northamptonshire cast another in 1755. The then treble bell broke in 1789 but John Warner and Sons of the Whitechapel Bell Foundry recast it that same year. In the 19th century the Bagley bell survived for a long time with a fracture, but in 1895 its tongue and head fell out. Mears and Stainbank of the Whitechapel Bell Foundry replaced or recast the broken bell in 1898. In 1998 the Whitechapel Bell Foundry cast a new treble bell, making the 1789 bell the second bell and increasing the tower to a ring of six bells. In 1999 the new bell was hung and the old bells re-hung as a project for the village to celebrate the Millennium. John Warner and Sons cast the present Sanctus bell in 1793.

St Mary's church clock is of unknown date but appears to be late 17th century. Two of the wheels of the going train are characteristic of the work of the clockmaker and bellfounder Edward Hemins of Bicester, which would make them an early-18th-century alteration.

St Mary's is now part of the Church of England Benefice of the Ray Valley.

=== Baptist and Methodist chapels ===
Charlton-on-Otmoor had a Baptist meeting house by 1810 and a chapel in 1835. The village also had a Methodist congregation by 1829 and a chapel in 1840. The Methodist chapel had ceased to be used by the end of the 19th century and was sold to the rector in 1920 for use as a club room. The Baptist chapel closed around 2010 and was later sold and converted to a residential property.

== Amenities ==
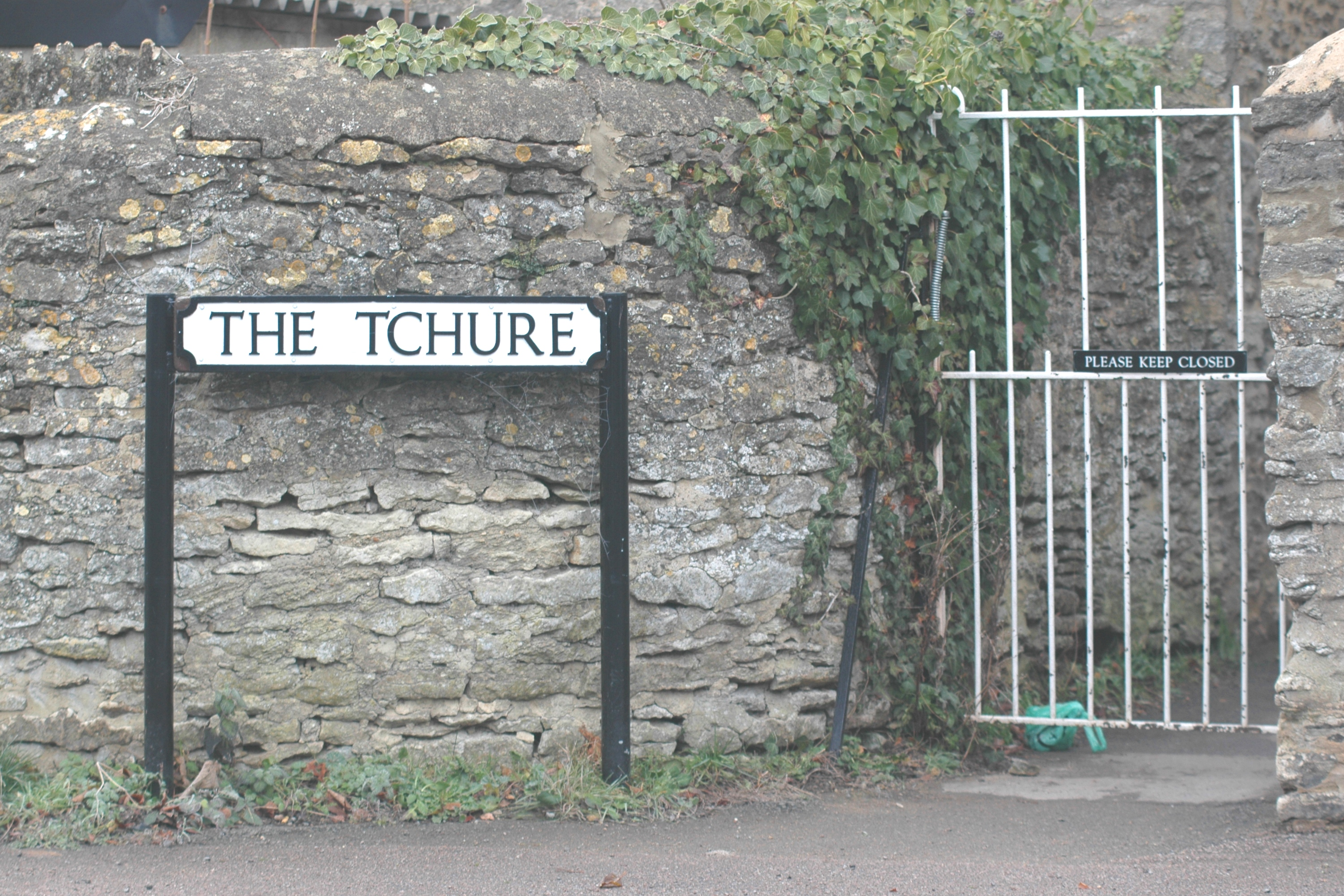
"Tchure" is a common Midlands dialect word for an alley. The Tchure in Charlton-on-Otmoor is an old alleyway that is now a bridleway. Oxfordshire has identically named alleys in Deddington and Upper Heyford.

=== Primary school ===
The enclosure of 1858 set aside land for the building of a school and in 1866 Charlton Parochial School and a master's house were built, mostly at the expense of the rector. The number of pupils grew and a second classroom was added in 1892. It was reorganised as a junior school in 1937 and became a voluntary controlled school in 1951. It is now Charlton-on-Otmoor Church of England Primary School with over 100 children attending the school and pre-school.

=== Public houses ===
The George and Dragon was where locals formed the Otmoor Association in 1830, leading to the Otmoor Riots in opposition to plans to drain and enclose Otmoor. The rioters achieved their aim, and the villagers continued to farm a four-field open field system. A later attempt at enclosure in 1858 was successful. The Crown continues to trade.

=== Local groups ===
The Otmoor branch of the WI meets monthly at Charlton-on-Otmoor Community Hall.

== Transport ==
=== Bus ===
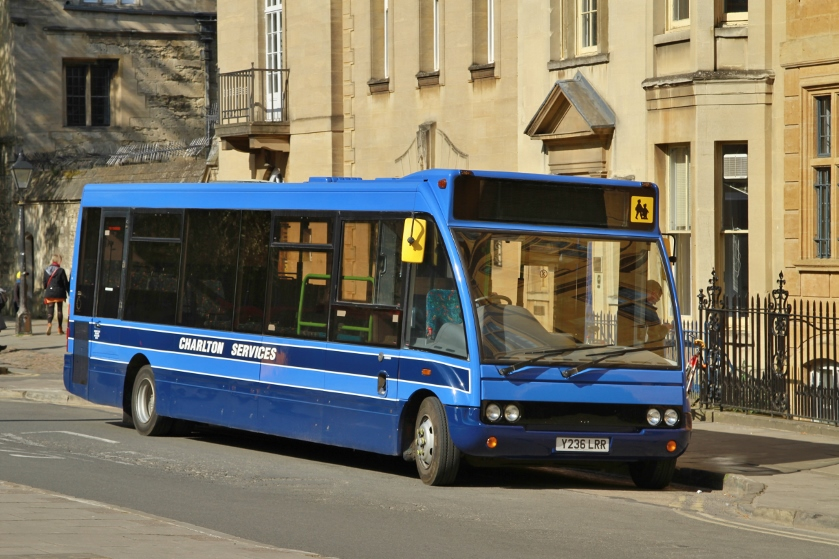
Charlton Services bus on route 94 at its terminus outside Balliol College, Oxford

The first regular bus service on Otmoor was started in the 1920s and after a change of ownership in the 1950s was renamed Charlton Services. The company continues to provide Charlton-on-Otmoor and neighbouring villages with a service to Oxford via Islip.

Phyllis Maycock (1922–2005) was a bus conductor with Charlton Services for 49 years, retiring in December 1992. In the 1994 New Year Honours, Maycock was made an MBE "For services to the Bus Industry". Also in 1994, Maycock starred in an episode of This Is Your Life.

=== Railway ===
The Buckinghamshire Railway between Bletchley and Oxford passes through Charlton parish and was completed in 1851. The London and North Western Railway took it over in 1879 and opened Charlton Halt, 1 mile (1.6 km) north of the village, in 1905. The 1923 Grouping made the L&NWR part of the new London, Midland and Scottish Railway, which closed Charlton Halt in 1926. The LMS was nationalised as part of British Railways in 1948, which ended passenger services in 1967 and reduced the line to single track.

Oxfordshire County Council arranged for British Rail to reopen the line in 1987 and Islip station in 1988. From 2014 to 2016 Network Rail rebuilt the railway as a 100 mph (160 km/h) main line linked to the Chiltern Main Line by a junction at Bicester. The nearest railway station is Islip, 3 miles (5 km) from Charlton. It is served by Chiltern Railways with direct trains to London Marylebone via Bicester Village and Oxford via Oxford Parkway.

== Sources and further reading ==
- Beeson, CFC; Simcock, AV (1989) [1962]. Clockmaking in Oxfordshire 1400–1850 (3rd ed.). Oxford: Museum of the History of Science. pp. 33–34. ISBN 0-903364-06-9.
- Baggs, AP; Colvin, Christina; Colvin, HM; Cooper, Janet; Day, CJ; Selwyn, Nesta; Tomkinson, A (1983). "Deddington". In Crossley, Alan (ed.). A History of the County of Oxford. Victoria County History. Vol. 11: Wootton Hundred (northern part). London: Oxford University Press for the Institute of Historical Research. ISBN 978-0-19722-758-9.
- Gelling, Margaret (1953). Smith, AH (ed.). The Place-Names of Oxfordshire, Part I. Vol. XXIII. based on material collected by Doris Mary Stenton. Cambridge: Cambridge University Press for the English Place-Name Society. p. 205.
- Jackson, Christine (2008). "Thomas Garth, Rector of Charlton-on-Otmoor, 1615–1643: Rake or Reformer?" (PDF). Oxoniensia. LXXIII. Oxfordshire Architectural and Historical Society: 45–58. ISSN 0308-5562.
- Lobel, Mary D, ed. (1959). "Charlton-on-Otmoor". A History of the County of Oxford. Victoria County History. Vol. 6: Ploughley Hundred. London: Oxford University Press for the Institute of Historical Research. pp. 80–92.
- Sherwood, Jennifer; Pevsner, Nikolaus (1974). Oxfordshire. The Buildings of England. Harmondsworth: Penguin Books. pp. 529–530. ISBN 0-14-071045-0.
