= Alfred John Dunkin =

British antiquarian and historian

- Born: 9 August 1812; Islington
- Died: 30 January 1879 (aged 66); London
- Resting place: Dartford
- Occupation: historian

Alfred John Dunkin (1812–1879) was a British antiquary and historian.

== Life ==
He was the only son of John Dunkin by his wife Anne, daughter of William Chapman, civil engineer, was born at Islington, London, on 9 August 1812. He received his education at the Military College, Vendôme.

In 1831, he entered his father's printing and stationery business at Bromley, Kent, removed with him in 1837 to a new establishment at Dartford, and a little later took charge of a branch business at Gravesend. Some years after his father's death, in December 1846, he opened a London branch at 140 Queen Victoria Street.

Dunkin belonged to numerous archæological societies, English and foreign. As an original member of the British Archæological Association, he edited and printed the report of the first general meeting, held at Canterbury in September 1844 (one hundred and fifty copies, octavo, London, Gravesend, printed in 1845), and that of the special general meeting of 5 March 1845 (one hundred and fifty copies, octavo, London, Gravesend, printed in 1845). Again, in 1851 he saw through the press the report of the fifth general meeting, held at Worcester in August 1848. He also edited The Archæological Mine, a collection of Antiquarian Nuggets relating to the County of Kent … including the Laws of Kent during the Saxon epoch, vols. 1–3, octavo, London, 1855 [53–63]. In the belief that he was the original editor, he printed (octavo, Noviomago, 1856) twenty-five copies of the works of Radulphus, abbot of Coggeshall, to which he appended an English translation. An imperfect copy of this unlucky undertaking, with some severe remarks by Sir Frederic Madden, is in the British Museum.

While travelling in the severe winter of 1878–9, he was seized with bronchitis at Newbury, Berkshire, but managed to get up to London to the house of an old nurse at 110 Stamford Street, Blackfriars Road. There he died after a few days' illness, 30 January 1879. He was buried in Dartford cemetery, 4 February. He was never married.

== Legacy ==
By his will he directed that after the death of his sister and residuary legatee, Miss Ellen Elizabeth Dunkin, his library and collections are to go, under certain conditions, to the Guildhall Library.

On failure of such conditions the collections are to be presented to the trustees of the British Museum; and that the family monuments at Dartford and Bromley may be maintained and renewed when necessary, he left to the lord mayor, the vicars of Dartford and Bromley, and the principal librarian of the British Museum freehold estates at Stone, Erith, and Bromley; ten guineas annually to be spent in a visitation dinner to examine the tombs and memorials ('Printing Times and Lithographer, 15 April 1879, page 89).

Alfred John Dunkin was one the first to claim "Tarshish demonstrated to be Britain" in his history of Springhead (1844).

== Works ==
Dunkin had an honest love for antiquities, but his writings contain little that is valuable. The lighter essays which he contributed to periodicals, and of which he afterwards reprinted a few copies, are simply inane. The following is probably an incomplete list:

1. Nundinæ Cantianæ. Some Account of the Chantry of Milton-next-Gravesend, in which is introduced a notice of Robert Pocock, the history of Dartford Market and Fair, together with remarks on the appointment of Grammar School Feoffees generally, duodecimo, Dover, 1842 (twelve copies printed).
2. Legendæ Cantianæ. William de Eynsford, the excommunicate; a Kentish legend, octavo, London, 1842 (twenty-five copies printed).
3. Nundinæ Floraliæ. Fugitive Papers. May Day, May Games, &c., octavo, Dover, 1843 (twelve copies printed).
4. Nundinæ Literariæ. Fugitive Papers. Christmas Eve, Christmas, Easter, Whitsuntide, Harvest-Time, and the Morris Dancers, duodecimo, Dover, 1843 (twelve copies printed).
5. The Reign of Lockrin: a poem. Remarks upon modern poetry. Second edition with additions. The History of Lockrin, &c., octavo, London, Dartford (printed, 1845).
6. Memoranda of Springhead and its neighbourhood during the primeval period (without author's name), octavo, London, 1848 (one hundred copies privately printed).
7. History of the County of Kent, 3 vols. octavo, London, 1856–58–55 [–77].
