= Wendlebury =

Village in Oxfordshire, England

Coordinates: 51.872°N 1.187°W

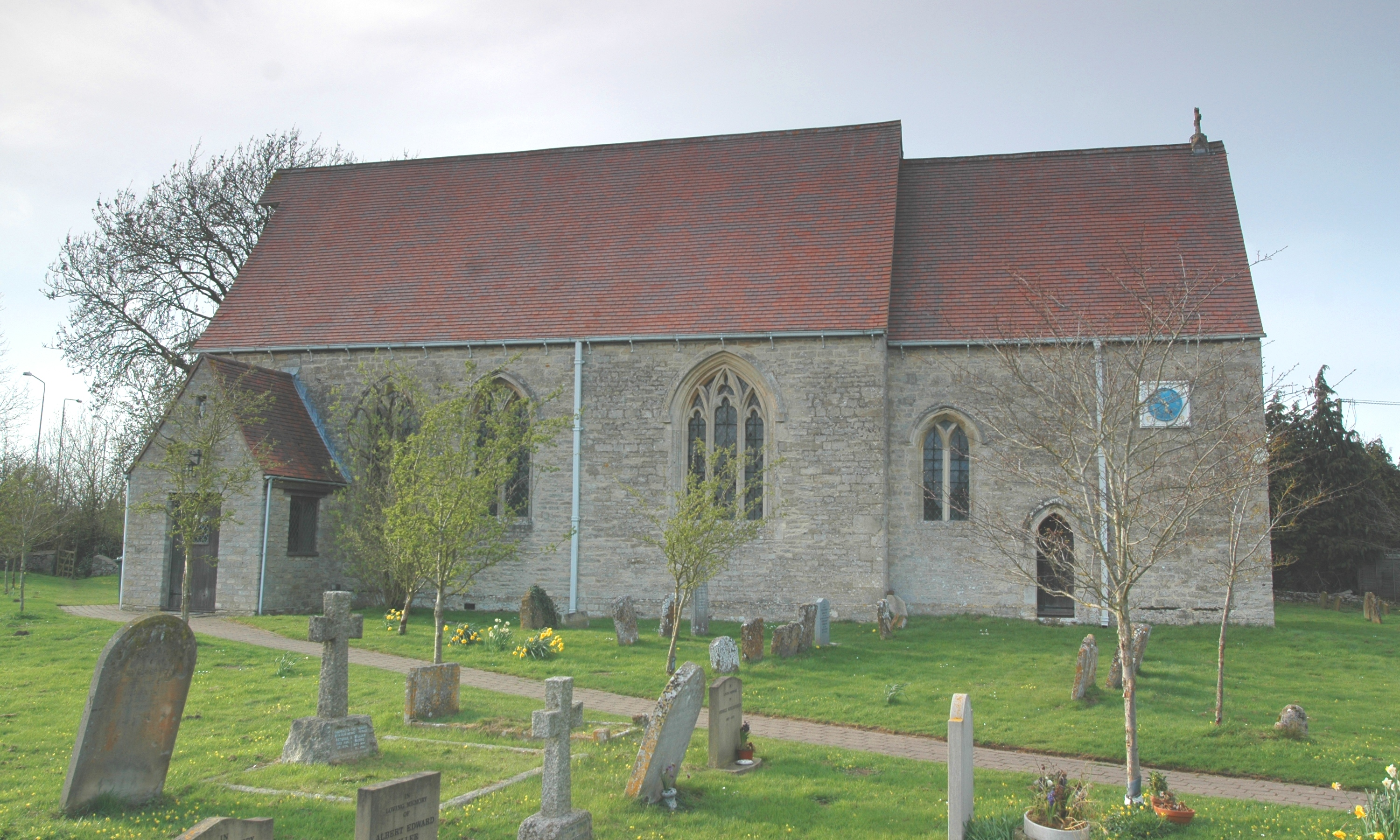
- St Giles' parish church

- Location within Oxfordshire
- Area: 4.65 km^{2} (1.80 sq mi)
- Population: 421 (2011 census)
  - Density: 91/km^{2} (240/sq mi)
- OS grid reference: SP5619
- Civil parish: Wendlebury
- District: Cherwell
- Shire county: Oxfordshire
- Region: South East
- Country: England
- Sovereign state: United Kingdom
- Post town: Bicester
- Postcode district: OX25
- Dialling code: 01869
- Police: Thames Valley
- Fire: Oxfordshire
- Ambulance: South Central
- UK Parliament: Bicester and Woodstock
- Website: Wendlebury Village

Wendlebury is a village and civil parish about 2 miles (3 km) southwest of Bicester and about 1/2 mile (800 m) from Junction 9 of the M40. Junction 9 is where the A34 and A41 roads meet the M40, and it is also called the Wendlebury Interchange.

A stream flows through the centre of the village, parallel with the main street. The 2011 census recorded the parish's population as 421.

The toponym is derived from Old English, meaning the burh of a Saxon named Wændel.

== Manor ==
Before the Norman Conquest of England in the 11th century, one Asgar held the manor. After the Conquest, William the Conqueror granted Wendlebury to Geoffrey de Mandeville. The manor remained with his heirs, including his grandson of the same name whom King Stephen made 1st Earl of Essex in about 1140. The de Mandeville lineage became extinct upon the death of William FitzGeoffrey de Mandeville, 3rd Earl of Essex, in 1227, and its manors including Wendlebury passed to Humphrey de Bohun, 2nd Earl of Hereford, in 1236. Henry III made Humphrey Earl of Essex in 1239. Wendlebury remained with the Earls of Hereford and Essex until the death of Humphrey de Bohun, 7th Earl of Hereford, in 1373.

The manor of Wendlebury then consisted of two knight's fees. After the 7th Earl's death the manor was divided, with one fee passing to the Earl's elder daughter Eleanor de Bohun, wife of Thomas of Woodstock, 1st Duke of Gloucester. There is no known record to indicate whether the other fee passed to Eleanor's younger sister Mary de Bohun, wife of Henry Bolingbroke. Eleanor's half of Wendlebury seems to have passed to Thomas and Eleanor's daughter Anne of Gloucester, for in 1403 it belonged to Anne's second husband Edmund Stafford, 5th Earl of Stafford. There is no known record of the overlordship of Wendlebury after 1403, so it seems to have lapsed.

At the time of the Hundred Rolls in 1279, Thame Abbey held five virgates of land at Wendlebury. The abbey seems to have disposed of this land before 1317, as an inventory of its estates at that time makes no mention of Wendlebury. Rewley Abbey was founded in 1281 and by 1293 held at Wendlebury eight virgates of arable land plus 20 acres (8 ha) of meadow. Rewley retained this minor estate until the dissolution of the monasteries in the 16th centuries, when it passed to Thomas Pope of Wroxton Abbey.

The present manor house was built in the 17th century and remodelled in the 18th century.

== Parish church ==
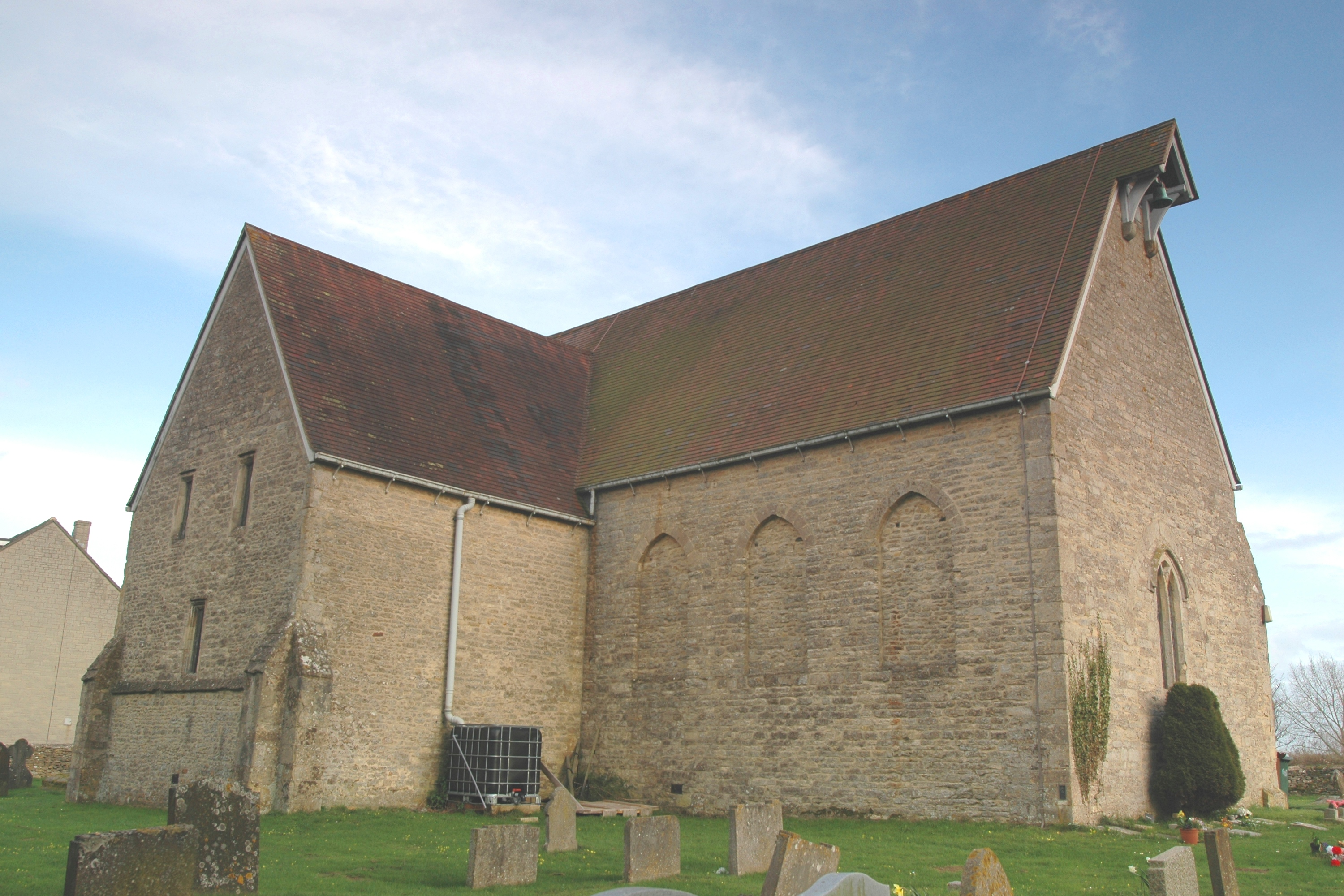
St, Giles' nave and north transept, seen from the northwest

The earliest known record of the Church of England parish church of Saint Giles is from early in the 13th century. It was cruciform until 1639, when the south transept was found to be so unsafe that it was demolished.

In 1757 the remainder of the building was found unsafe and in March 1761 everything but the belltower was demolished. By September that year a new nave, chancel and two transepts had been completed, incorporating from the old church general building materials, early Decorated Gothic windows from about 1300 and a Perpendicular Gothic doorway.

The foundations continued to give trouble and in 1901–02 the medieval tower and 18th-century south transept were demolished. At the same time the architect John Oldrid Scott restored the remainder of the building, renewing the roof and installing new seating. The tower had three bells: two cast in the 16th century and the third in 1695. Since the demolition of the tower these have stood in the west end of the nave. The west gable of the nave now has a bell-cot with one bell.

St Giles' is now part of the Benefice of Akeman, along with the parishes of Bletchingdon, Chesterton, Hampton Gay, Kirtlington, Middleton Stoney and Weston-on-the-Green.

The Old Rectory was built in 1840, replacing an earlier house that had existed by 1634.

== Social and economic history ==
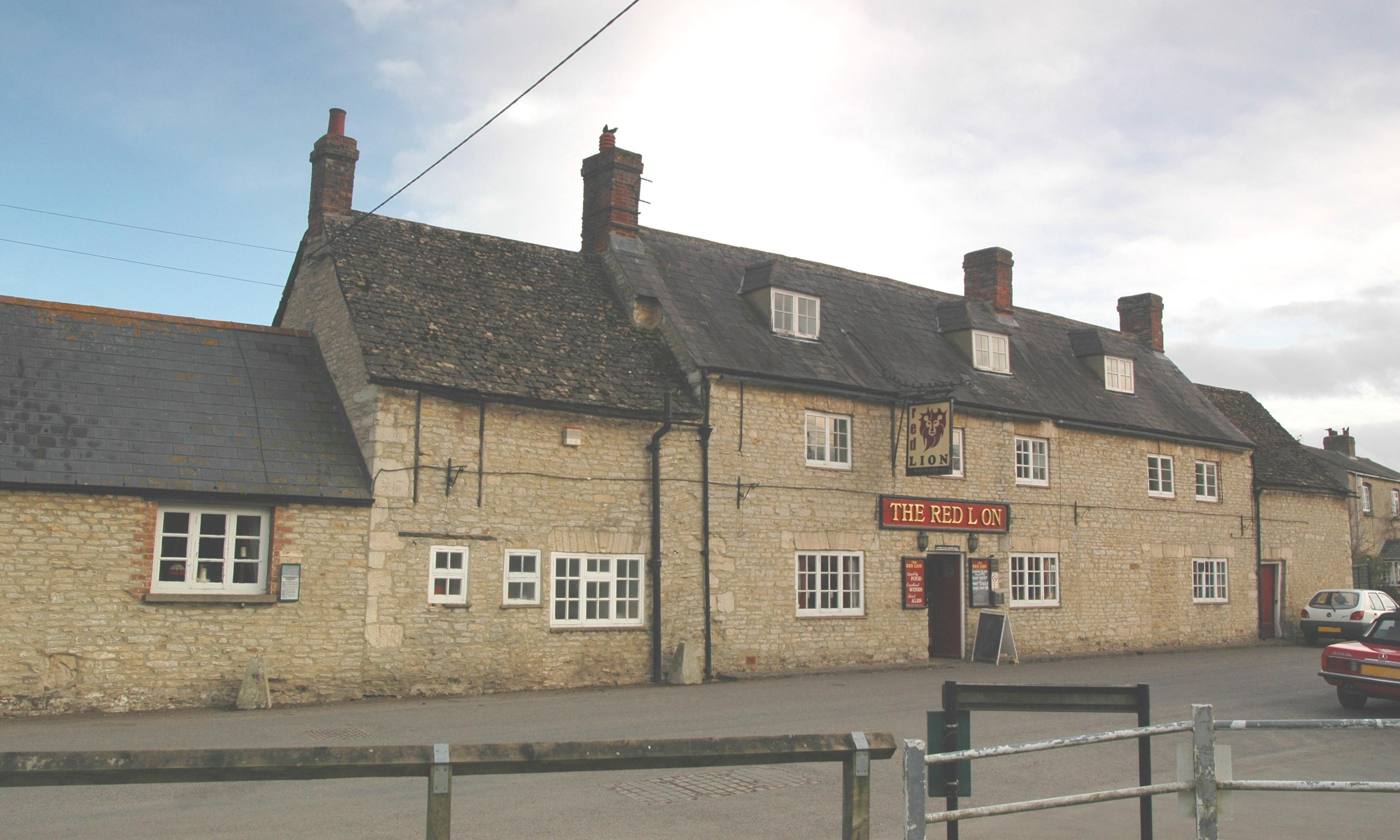
The Red Lion public house

Wendlebury has one public house, the Red Lion. It was built in the 17th century and seems to have been trading as an inn by 1732. In 1790 a farmer from Merton started a brewery in the village but the business failed and in 1809 was put up for sale. A Bicester brewer bought it in 1820.

An open field system of farming continued in the parish until 1801, when its common lands were enclosed by Act of Parliament. 1,160 acres (470 ha) of land were enclosed, of which 500 acres (200 ha) were awarded to the lord of the manor, Thomas Coker.

Rev. George Dupuis, who was rector from 1789 to 1839, farmed Wendlebury's 25 acres (10 ha) of glebe himself. When Wendlebury was enclosed the tithes were commuted for 189 acres (76 ha) of land. This gave Dupuis more space in which to exercise improved farming techniques, including a seven-year crop rotation.

A National School was opened in 1850 and new school buildings for it were completed in 1863. In 1927 it was reorganised as a junior school, with pupils of secondary school age thereafter going to Bicester. It became a controlled school in 1952.

The Oxford to Bletchley railway, completed in 1851 as part of the Buckinghamshire Railway, passes through the parish. The London and North Western Railway took over the Buckinghamshire Railway in 1879 and opened Wendlebury Halt southeast of the village in 1905. The Railways Act 1921 made the LNWR part of the new London, Midland and Scottish Railway, which closed Wendlebury Halt in 1926. The line's nearest station to Wendlebury is now Bicester Village, 2 miles (3 km) away.

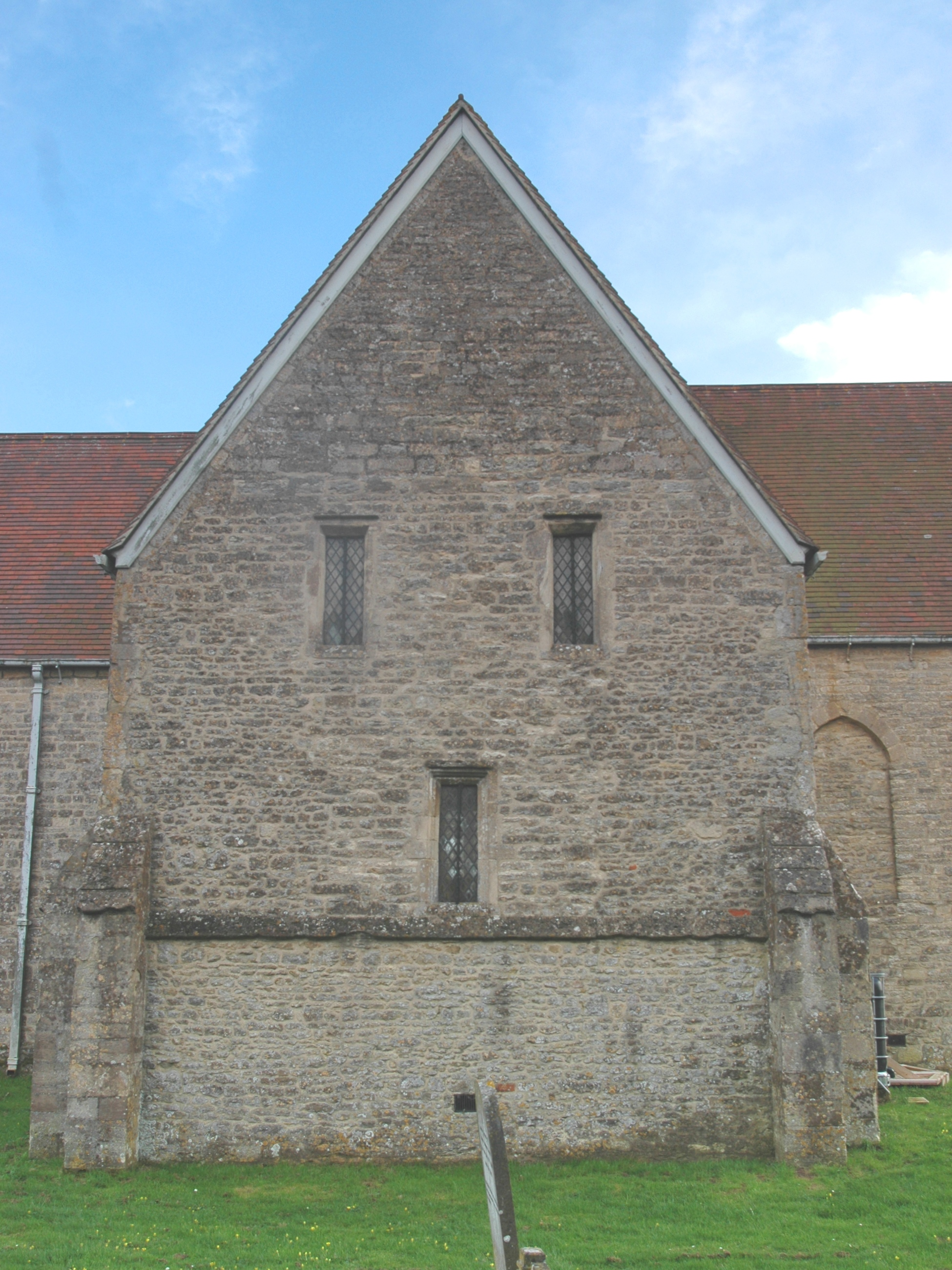
St Giles' north transept, seen from the north

== Public transport ==
Grayline bus route 24 serves Wendlebury, linking it with Bicester via in one direction and with Oxford via Weston-on-the-Green, Kirtlington, Bletchingdon and Oxford Parkway in the other. Buses run from Mondays to Saturdays, four times a day in each direction. There is no late evening service, and no service on Sundays or bank holidays.

== Sources and further reading ==
- Henig, Martin (1990). "A Silver Ring from the Wendlebury Area" (PDF). Oxoniensia. LV. Oxfordshire Architectural and Historical Society: 167–169.
- Lobel, Mary D, ed. (1959). A History of the County of Oxford. Victoria County History. Vol. 6: Ploughley Hundred. London: Oxford University Press for the Institute of Historical Research. pp. 338–346.
- Sherwood, Jennifer; Pevsner, Nikolaus (1974). Oxfordshire. The Buildings of England. Harmondsworth: Penguin Books. p. 832. ISBN 0-14-071045-0.
