= JJP =

JJP may refer to:

== People ==
- Jacobus Johannes Pieter Oud or J. J. P. Oud (1890–1963), a Dutch architect
- John Jewell Penstone or JJP (1817–1902), English painter and engraver
- Jack Joseph Puig, also known as JJP, American Record Label Executive, Record Producer and Recording Engineer

== Other uses ==
- Jannayak Janta Party, a political party in Haryana, India
- Jetstar Japan, a low-fare Japanese airline
- Jews for Justice for Palestinians, an organization
- Joondalup railway station, in Australia

.
