= Oddington Halt railway station =

Disused railway station in Oxfordshire, England

Coordinates: 51.8393°N 1.2149°W

Oddington Halt

General information
- Location: Oddington, Oxfordshire; England
- Grid reference: SP542159
- Platforms: 2

Other information
- Status: Disused

History
- Original company: London and North Western Railway
- Pre-grouping: London and North Western Railway
- Post-grouping: LMSR

Key dates
- 1905: Station opened
- 1 January 1917: closed
- 5 May 1919: opened
- 1926: Station closed
Location

Oddington Halt was a railway station on the Varsity Line 1 mile (1.6 km) northwest of the village of Oddington, Oxfordshire. The London and North Western Railway opened the halt in 1905 and the London, Midland and Scottish Railway closed it in 1926.

== Routes ==
Preceding station	Historical railways	Following station
Islip; Line and station open	London and North Western Railway; Varsity Line	Charlton Halt; Line open, station closed

== Sources ==
- "Disused Stations". Subterranea Britannica.
