= Charlton Halt railway station (Oxfordshire) =

Disused railway station in Oxfordshire, England

Coordinates: 51.85244°N 1.19563°W

Charlton Halt

General information
- Location: Charlton-on-Otmoor, Oxfordshire; England
- Grid reference: SP556174
- Platforms: 2

Other information
- Status: Disused

History
- Original company: London and North Western Railway
- Pre-grouping: London and North Western Railway
- Post-grouping: LMSR

Key dates
- 1905: Station opened
- 1 January 1917: closed
- 5 May 1919: opened
- 1926: Station closed
Location

Charlton Halt was a railway station on the Varsity Line 1 mile (1.6 km) north of the village of Charlton-on-Otmoor. The London and North Western Railway opened the halt in 1905 and the London, Midland and Scottish Railway closed it in 1926.

== Routes ==
Preceding station	Historical railways	Following station
Oddington Halt; Line open, station closed	London and North Western Railway; Varsity Line	Wendlebury Halt; Line open, station closed

== Sources ==
- "Disused Stations". Subterranea Britannica.
