= Wendlebury Halt railway station =

Disused railway station in Oxfordshire, England

Coordinates: 51.8785°N 1.1653°W

Wendlebury Halt

General information
- Location: Wendlebury, Oxfordshire; England
- Grid reference: SP575203
- Platforms: 2

Other information
- Status: Disused

History
- Original company: London and North Western Railway
- Pre-grouping: London and North Western Railway
- Post-grouping: LMSR

Key dates
- 9 October 1905: Station opened
- 1 January 1917: closed
- 5 May 1919: opened
- 1926: Station closed
Location

Wendlebury Halt was a railway station on the Varsity Line, located 1/2 mile (800 m) east of the village of Wendlebury in Alchester. The London and North Western Railway opened the halt in 1905 and the London, Midland and Scottish Railway closed it in 1926.

== Routes ==
Preceding station	Historical railways	Following station
Charlton Halt; Line open, station closed	London and North Western Railway; Varsity Line	Bicester; Line and station open

== Sources ==
- "Disused Stations". Subterranea Britannica.
