= Islip, Oxfordshire =

Village in Oxfordshire, England

Coordinates: 51.823°N 01.236°W

Islip
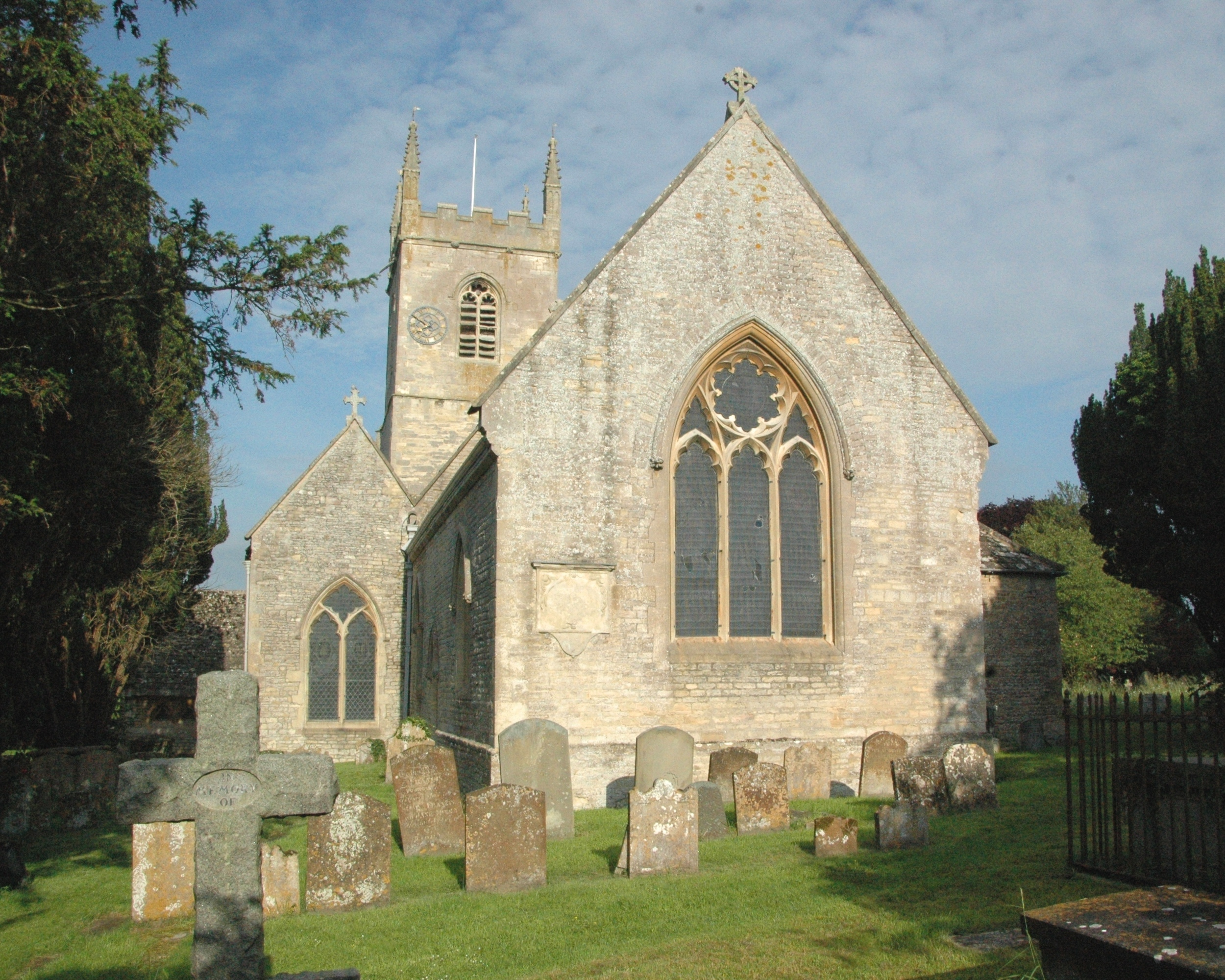
- Parish Church of St Nicholas

- Location within Oxfordshire
- Area: 6.42 km^{2} (2.48 sq mi)
- Population: 652 (2011 Census)
  - Density: 102/km^{2} (260/sq mi)
- OS grid reference: SP5214
- Civil parish: Islip
- District: Cherwell
- Shire county: Oxfordshire
- Region: South East
- Country: England
- Sovereign state: United Kingdom
- Post town: KIDLINGTON
- Postcode district: OX5
- Dialling code: 01865
- Police: Thames Valley
- Fire: Oxfordshire
- Ambulance: South Central
- UK Parliament: Bicester and Woodstock

Islip (/ˈaɪslɪp/) is a village and civil parish on the River Ray, just above its confluence with the River Cherwell in Oxfordshire, England. It is about 2 miles (3 km) east of Kidlington and about 5 miles (8 km) north of Oxford. The 2011 Census recorded the parish's population as 652.

== Archaeology ==
The remains of a Romano-British villa have been found about 1/2 mile (800 m) southwest of the village. Attempts to locate the royal residence that served as the birth place of Edward the Confessor have so far proved unsuccessful.

== Parish church ==
Edward the Confessor (born circa 1004, died 1066) was born in Islip and was baptised in a church here, with the font now residing in Middleton Stoney. Parts of the present church date from about 1200. The chancel was rebuilt in 1780 and the church was restored in 1861. The church is Islip's only Grade I Listed Building. The belltower has a fine ring of eight bells, with the tenor weighing 8-1-7 in G. There is little information about the bells before 1859, when they were recast as a 9cwt ring of 6 by George Mears, with an additional treble and second being added in 1952 by Mears and Stainbank to complete the octave. They were re-tuned by Whitechapel and re-hung by Whites of Appleton in 1992. They are rung by a wonderful and highly skilled band both for Tuesday practices and Sunday services. Since 1987 the Church of England parish has been part of the Ray Valley Benefice. A chapel associated with Edward the Confessor existed north of the church. The chapel was damaged in April 1645 in a military engagement in the English Civil War, and in the 1780s it was demolished. The former rectory was built in 1689 for Robert South and enlarged in 1807 for William Vincent. It is one of several Grade II* Listed Buildings in Islip.

== Economic and social history ==
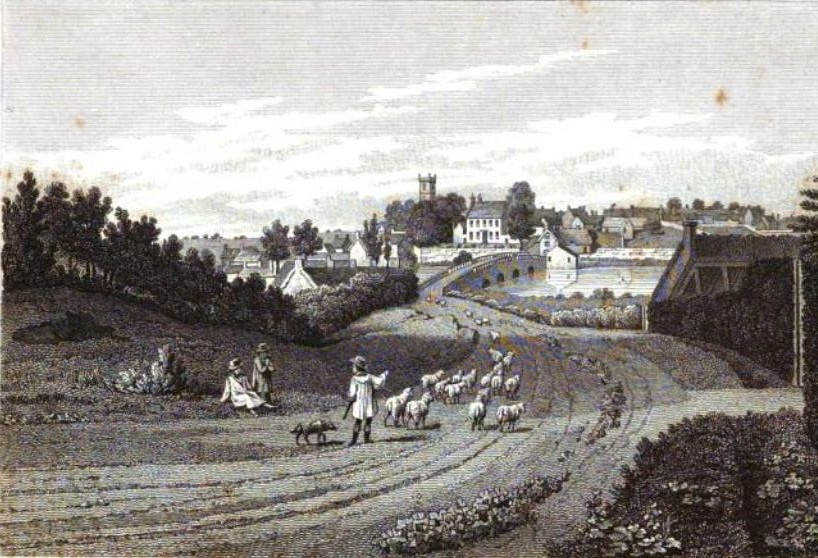
View of Islip from the south, published in 1823 in John Dunkin's Oxfordshire. The History & Antiquities of the Hundreds of Bullington & Ploughley. It shows the four-arch bridge over the River Ray that in 1878 was demolished and replaced by the present three-arched one.

The Domesday Book of 1086 recorded a watermill at Islip. A mill survived in the village until 1949, when it was demolished. When the Domesday Book was compiled, Islip's common fields system was on the north side of the River Ray. At some time before 1300, Islip's villagers assarted (cleared) about 200 acres (81 ha) of uncultivated land south of the River Ray and east of the River Cherwell and divided it into strips as a new common field for strip farming. In the 1970s this area of farmland was called Sart Field.

The Black Death in the 14th century led to the end of week-work in the parish. This was unpaid work that peasants had to do for the Lord of the manor, and the number of days per week that the manor could ask was fixed. This system had been reinstated by the harvest of 1357 and was probably stopped in Islip in 1386. Sir William Fermor was Steward of the Manor of Islip in March 1540. His brother Richard Fermor was a wool merchant. The Fermor family had its seat at Somerton, Oxfordshire and had a number of estates in the northern part of the county.

The medieval road linking London and Worcester crossed the Ray at Islip. The original crossing was a ford but was later supplemented by a bridge. In the 1640s the bridge and Islip's nearness to Oxford made the village a strategic objective for both sides in the English Civil War. Early in the war, Islip was a strategic outpost for the Royalist capital at Oxford. In May 1644 a force under the Parliamentarian Earl of Essex occupied Islip but early in 1645 a Royalist force under the Earl of Northampton retook it. In April 1645 a force under Oliver Cromwell retook the village and routed the Earl of Northampton's men in an engagement on Islip Bridge. On 4 July 1645 the Parliamentarian Lord Fairfax had his men demolish the bridge, which was described as having been "new-built". Then in 1646 during the Third Siege of Oxford a force under the Parliamentarian Colonel George Fleetwood occupied the village. After the war the bridge was rebuilt or replaced, and John Ogilby's Britannia Atlas of 1675 describes it as having six arches. Until the 18th century the ford remained the main crossing except in winter. In that century the road between London and Worcester became a coaching route and Islip developed as a staging post. Islip was on the winter route between Oxford and Buckingham when Gosford Bridge was impassable.

A number of houses in the village bear the names of its numerous coaching inns. The Plume of Feathers, also called the Prince's Arms, was built around 1780 reputedly from materials from the demolished Confessor's Chapel. It has since been demolished. The King's Head, also called the Coach And Horses, was built in the 17th century and became a private house in about 1976. There were inns called the Boot, the Britannia, the Fox and Grapes and the Saddlers Arms. The Saddlers Arms was still trading in 1949 but has since closed. Some of the Westminster Prebends met their tenants at the Red Lion.

In 1788 the bridge was turnpiked and the turnpike trustees closed the ford. The Dean and Chapter of Westminster Abbey, who were responsible for the bridge's upkeep, objected to the increased traffic and wear on the bridge. In 1816 they tried and failed to pass responsibility for these repairs to either the turnpike trustees or the county. In 1815 Parliament passed the Otmoor Enclosure Act, which after violent local objection led to the partial drainage of Otmoor. The increased flow of the River Ray scoured the river bed and undermined the bridge. Otmoor Drainage Commissioners denied liability but paid for the repair of two of its arches. An engraving published by John Dunkin in 1823 shows the bridge as having four arches. In 1878 the Thames Valley Drainage Commission widened the river and replaced the bridge with one of three arches. Villagers in the "seven towns" of Otmoor resisted the proposed enclosure and drainage of Otmoor. Unrest came to a head in 1830–31, and the Oxfordshire Militia and the Buckinghamshire Yeomanry were deployed to quell it. The militia was joined by a company of Coldstream Guards that had marched from London on 30 July 1831 and was billeted in the village.

In 1850 the Buckinghamshire Railway completed its line from Bletchley through Islip parish to Oxford Rewley Road, and opened Islip railway station to serve the village. British Railways withdrew passenger services from the line in 1967 and Islip station was demolished. Oxfordshire County Council and Network SouthEast reinstated passenger trains between Oxford and Bicester Town in 1987 and opened a new station in 1989. The line and Islip station were closed for upgrading under Chiltern Railways' Evergreen 3 project and reopened on 26 October 2015. Trains between London Marylebone and Oxford serve Islip. When the East West Rail is completed, trains between Oxford and Milton Keynes Central will also pass through Islip.

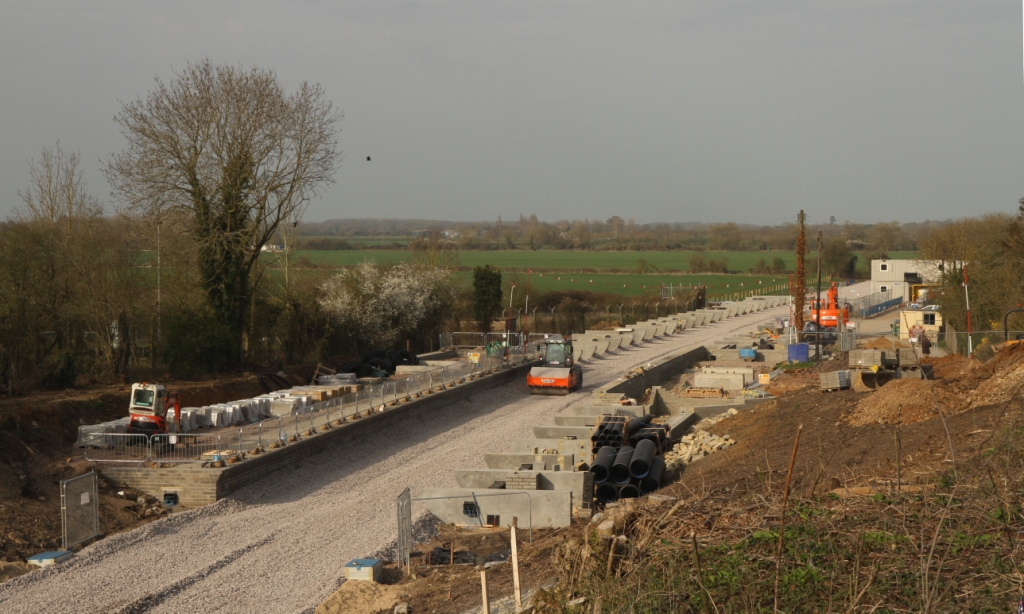
Islip railway station being enlarged in April 2015

=== School ===
In 1704 the Rector, Robert South, founded a trust for apprenticing two children from the parish each year, and in 1709 he enlarged and endowed the trust to create a school for poor boys of the parish. A school building was completed in 1710, and in 1712 South finalised the size of the school at not less than 15 and not more than 21 pupils. The school issued each boy with a uniform of a blue coat and a blue cap. In 1812 the number of pupils was increased and in 1815 there were between 90 and 100 boys at the school. By then Dr South's school was following the National School system. By 1833 the number of pupils had fallen to 75 but girls were also admitted. By 1856 a separate infants' school had been added, but later in the 19th century this was absorbed as the infants' department of Dr South's school. In 1893 a new school building was completed to replace the original 1710 premises. The combined total of infants and older pupils was 102 in 1889 and 100 in 1906. Dr South's was reorganised as a junior school, with secondary age pupils transferred to Kidlington Church of England Central School at Gosford. This left Dr South's with only 34 pupils by 1937. In 1950 Dr South's became a voluntary aided school. In 1954 Dr South's had 84 pupils; it now has modern 20th century premises.

=== Culture ===
A mummers play, dating from 1780, has been linked to Islip. Mummery continued in Islip until at least 1894 with a play depicting a girl called Molly who fell ill with toothache only to find, on extraction, that a nail was causing her the pain. There is another play featuring Fat Jack, a comic servant. The Shakespearean scholar and collector of English nursery rhymes and fairy tales James Orchard Halliwell-Phillipps lived in Islip in the 1840s. Early in the 1920s Robert Graves and Nancy Nicholson lived here, and Graves describes their life in the village in Goodbye to All That. In 2014 the Oxfordshire Blue Plaques Board unveiled a blue plaque to Graves on the house that he and Nicholson shared in Collice Street. The rock band the Candyskins had its origins in Islip in the late 1970s and 1980s.

== Amenities ==
Islip has one public house, The Swan; the other pub, the Red Lion, closed in February 2024. It also has a community shop and a village hall.

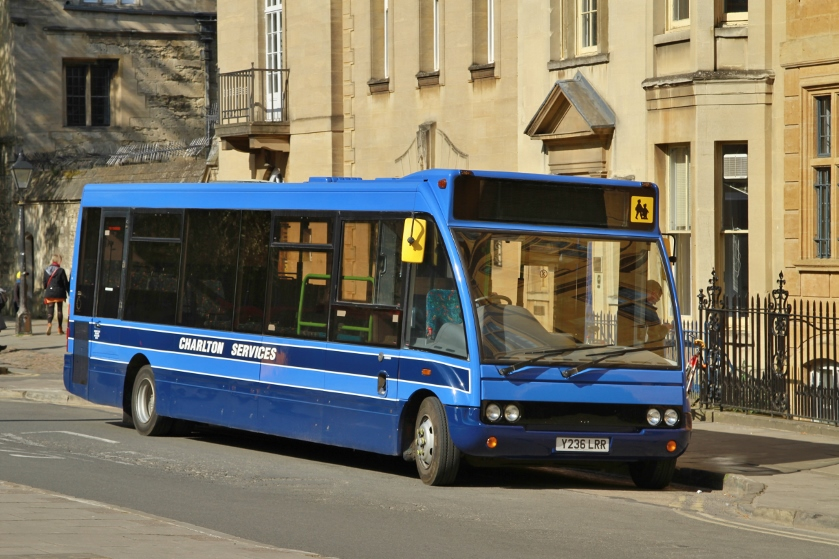
Charlton Services bus on route 94 at its terminus outside Balliol College, Oxford

=== Buses ===
Charlton-on-Otmoor Services bus route 94 links Islip with Oxford via Gosford. There is a limited service from Monday to Friday only. Stagecoach in Oxfordshire route H5 links Islip with the John Radcliffe Hospital via Barton, and with Bicester via Ambrosden. Buses run hourly from Monday to Saturday. Islip has no bus service on Sunday or on public holidays.

== Notable residents ==
- Edward the Confessor, King of England, was born in Islip about 1004.
- Walter de Islip (d. after 1342), Treasurer of Ireland from 1314 to 1325, was a native of Islip.
- Simon Islip (d. 1366), Archbishop of Canterbury from 1349 to 1366, was born in Islip and took his surname from it. He was a cousin of Walter de Islip.
- William Buckland (1784–1856), an English theologian, geologist and palaeontologist who was the first scientist to name and describe a dinosaur species in 1824 (Megalosaurus) and who had been Dean of Westminster as of 1845, died in Islip on 14 August 1856.
- James Orchard Halliwell-Phillipps (1820–1889), English Shakespearean scholar, antiquarian, and a collector of English nursery rhymes and fairy tales, lived in Islip in the 1840s.
- Robert Graves (1895–1985), the poet, and Nancy Nicholson (1899–1977), an artist, lived in Islip from 1921 to 1926, before moving abroad.
- Gilbert Ryle, a British philosopher (1900–76) lived in Islip with his twin sister Mary and her daughter Janet.
- Karl Leyser (1920–1992) and his wife Henrietta Leyser, historians at Oxford university, made their home in Islip.

== Climate ==
This area has a maritime temperate climate ("Cfb" by the Köppen system). Precipitation is uniformly distributed throughout the year and is provided mostly by weather systems that arrive from the Atlantic. The lowest temperature ever recorded was −16.6 °C (2.1 °F) in January 1982. The highest temperature ever recorded in Oxford is 35.6 °C (96 °F) in August 2003 during the 2003 European heat wave. The average conditions below are from the Radcliffe Meteorological Station. It has the longest series of temperature and rainfall records for one site in Britain. These records are continuous from January 1815. Irregular observations of rainfall, cloud and temperature exist from 1767.

Climate data for Islip, Oxfordshire
Month	Jan	Feb	Mar	Apr	May	Jun	Jul	Aug	Sep	Oct	Nov	Dec	Year
Record high °C (°F)	14.7 (58.5)	18.5 (65.3)	22.1 (71.8)	27.1 (80.8)	30.6 (87.1)	34.3 (93.7)	33.9 (93.0)	35.6 (96.1)	33.5 (92.3)	27.3 (81.1)	19.0 (66.2)	15.2 (59.4)	35.6 (96.1)
Mean daily maximum °C (°F)	6.8 (44.2)	7.4 (45.3)	10.1 (50.2)	13.0 (55.4)	16.7 (62.1)	19.8 (67.6)	21.7 (71.1)	21.2 (70.2)	18.5 (65.3)	14.2 (57.6)	9.8 (49.6)	7.4 (45.3)	13.9 (57.0)
Mean daily minimum °C (°F)	1.4 (34.5)	1.4 (34.5)	2.5 (36.5)	4.3 (39.7)	7.2 (45.0)	10.2 (50.4)	12.2 (54.0)	11.9 (53.4)	9.8 (49.6)	6.8 (44.2)	3.8 (38.8)	2.1 (35.8)	6.1 (43.0)
Record low °C (°F)	−16.6 (2.1)	−16.2 (2.8)	−10.9 (12.4)	−4.8 (23.4)	−1.8 (28.8)	1.3 (34.3)	4.4 (39.9)	3.5 (38.3)	−0.6 (30.9)	−5.1 (22.8)	−8.8 (16.2)	−16.1 (3.0)	−16.6 (2.1)
Average precipitation mm (inches)	52.6 (2.07)	41.0 (1.61)	41.1 (1.62)	43.9 (1.73)	50.6 (1.99)	53.3 (2.10)	59.5 (2.34)	58.3 (2.30)	60.3 (2.37)	65.3 (2.57)	61.8 (2.43)	55.8 (2.20)	643.5 (25.33)
Mean monthly sunshine hours	54.3	70.3	113.3	151.8	191.8	196.9	191.6	180.3	138.3	102.8	64.4	48.8	1,504.3
Source: Radcliffe Meteorological Station (NB: Data from the period 1881–2004)

== Bibliography ==
- Ball, F Elrington (1926). The Judges in Ireland 1221–1921. Vol. I. London: John Murray. p. 61.
- D.F.C. (1982). "Fermor, William (by 1480–1552) of Somerton, Oxon. and London". In Bindoff, ST (ed.). The House of Commons 1509–1558; Appendices, Constituencies, Members A–C. The History of Parliament. Vol. I. London: Secker and Warburg for the Parliament Trust. pp. 127–128. ISBN 0-436-04282-7.
- Dunkin, John (1823). "Islip". Oxfordshire. The History & Antiquities of the Hundreds of Bullington & Ploughley. London: Harding, Mavor and Lepard. pp. 274–302.
- Gordon, Elizabeth Oke; Buckland, William (1894). Life & Correspondence of William Buckland, D.D., F.R.S. Cambridge: Cambridge University Press. p. 260. ISBN 9781108021630.
- Halliwell, J.O. (1801). "Historical Notices of Islip, Oxfordshire". Journal of the British Archaeological Association. 5. London: Henry G Bohn: 39–51. doi:10.1080/00681288.1849.11886880.
- Harvey, P.D.A. (1991). Thirsk, Joan; Miller, Edward (eds.). The Agrarian History of England And Wales. Vol. III, 1348–1500. Cambridge: Cambridge University Press. p. 667. ISBN 0-521-20074-1.
- Hayward, Sarah (2007). Islip, Oxfordshire: From Edward the Confessor to the 21st Century. Cameron Grant Associates. ISBN 978-0-9555466-0-0.
- Jervoise, Edwyn (1932). The Ancient Bridges of Mid and Eastern England. Vol. III. Westminster: The Architectural Press for the SPAB. p. 154.
- Jennings, Anthony (2009). The Old Parsonage, The Story of the English Parsonage. London and New York: Continuum International Publishing Group. p. 100. ISBN 9780826426581.
- Lobel, Mary D, ed. (1957). A History of the County of Oxford. Victoria County History. Vol. 5: Bullingdon Hundred. London: Oxford University Press for the Institute of Historical Research. pp. 70–71.
- Lobel, Mary D, ed. (1959). A History of the County of Oxford. Victoria County History. Vol. 6: Ploughley Hundred. London: Oxford University Press for the Institute of Historical Research. pp. 205–219.
- MacKinnon, Daniel (1833). Origin and Services of the Coldstream Guards. Vol. 2. London: Richard Bentley. p. 449.
- Norland, Howard B. (1995). Drama in Early Tudor Britain 1485–1558. Lincoln: University of Nebraska Press. p. 59. ISBN 0-8032-3337-X.
- Percy, Reuben; Timbs, John, eds. (1824). "The Topographer. No. III. Edward the Confessor's Font". The Mirror of literature, amusement, and instruction. Vol. 4. London: J Limbird. p. 230.
- Rushworth, John, ed. (1722). "II: Actions between his Majesty's Forces and the Parliament's New Modell'd Army from the Beginning of the Year 1645, until after the Battle at Naseby, June 14th". Historical Collections of Private Passages of State. Vol. 6: 1645–47. pp. 22–89.
- Sherwood, Jennifer; Pevsner, Nikolaus (1974). Oxfordshire. The Buildings of England. Harmondsworth: Penguin Books. pp. 664–665. ISBN 0-14-071045-0.
- Taylor, Christopher (1982) [1975]. Fields in the English Landscape. Archaeology in the Field Series. London: J.M. Dent & Sons Ltd. pp. 75–76. ISBN 0-460-02232-6.
