= John Dunkin =

English topographer (1782–1846)

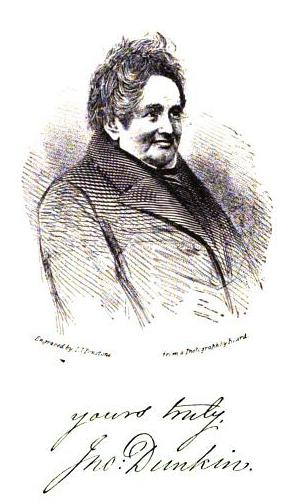
- John Dunkin by J. J. Penstone (after photograph by Beard) with Dunkin's signature
- Born: 16 May 1782
- Died: 22 December 1846 (aged 64)

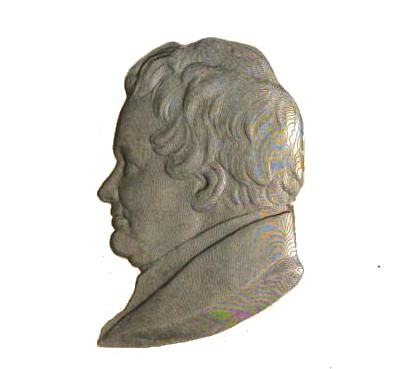

John Dunkin (16 May 1782 – 22 December 1846) was an English topographer.

== Life ==
He was the son of John Dunkin of Bicester, Oxfordshire, by his wife, Elizabeth, widow of John Telford, and daughter of Thomas and Johanna Timms, was born at Bicester on 16 May 1782. While attending the free school of that town, he met with a severe accident, and for many years it was feared that he would remain a cripple for life. He employed the leisure thus imposed upon him chiefly by scribbling verses, but contrived at the same time to pick up some knowledge of history and archæology.

After serving an apprenticeship to a printer, and living for a while in London, he established himself before 1815 as a bookseller, stationer, and printer at Bromley, Kent. Here he published his first topographical work, a compilation in part from Philipott, Hasted, and Lysons, entitled Outlines of the History and Antiquities of Bromley in Kent. … To which is added an investigation of the Antiquities of Holwood Hill ... by ... A. J. Kempe, octavo, Bromley, 1815. It was followed the next year by The History and Antiquities of Bicester. .. To which is added an Inquiry into the History of Alchester, a city of the Dobuni. … With an Appendix and … Kennetts Glossary, 2 parts, octavo, London, 1816.

In 1819, he commenced arranging for the press his account of the hundreds of Bullington and Ploughley, Oxfordshire, for which he had previously collected large materials. His son writes:

The following year was devoted principally to re-examinations of the towns, villages, &c., together with a personal superintendence of the great excavations he was conducting at Ambrosden and Bicester,

the particulars of which will be found detailed in the Appendix. In 1823, the work appeared under the title of Oxfordshire: the History and Antiquities of the Hundreds of Bullington and Ploughley, &c., 2 vols. quarto, London. The impression was limited to a hundred copies, of which seventy only were for sale.

In 1837, Dunkin moved to Dartford, where three years previously he had commenced to build himself a large printing establishment. Shortly afterwards he opened a branch business at Gravesend. In 1844, he published his History and Antiquities of Dartford with Topographical Notices of the Neighbourhood, octavo, London, Dartford [printed]. Thenceforward, he occupied himself in arranging the materials he had accumulated for the histories of Oxfordshire and Kent. He was an original member of the British Archæological Association.

He died on 22 December 1846, and by his desire was buried on the eastern side of the lichgate of St. Edmund's cemetery, Dartford, as near as possible to the burying-ground of Noviomagus, which he had described in his last work.

Dunkin's collections were given to the Guildhall Library by his daughter Ellen in 1886 and since 1954 those relating to Oxfordshire have been housed in the Bodleian Library.

== Family ==
In 1807, he married Anne, the daughter of William Chapman of Lincolnshire, a well-known civil engineer, by whom he left a son, Alfred John Dunkin, and a daughter, Ellen Elizabeth Dunkin. His widow survived him nineteen years, dying at Dartford on 12 March 1865, aged 77.
