= Robert Pocock =

English printer and antiquarian

- Born: 21 February 1760; Gravesend, Kent, England
- Died: 26 October 1830 (aged 70)
- Occupation: Antiquarian

Robert Pocock (21 February 1760 – 26 October 1830) was an English printer and antiquarian.

== Biography ==
Pocock was born at Gravesend, Kent, on 21 February 1760, was the second son of John Pocock (1720–1772), grocer. He was educated at the free school, and, after a short experience of his father's business, established himself as a printer in his native town. He married in 1779 his first wife, Ann Stillard (d. 1791), by whom he had three children. In 1786, he founded the first circulating library and printing-office at Gravesend (Pocock, Chronology, 1790, p. 14). His first literary productions were some children's books. In 1792 he married his second wife, a daughter of John Hinde (d. 1818), who bore him seven children. He published an excellent history of Gravesend (1797), as well as other contributions to the topographical and family history of Kent. He also wrote a history of Dartford, and some other works, which were never printed.

Pocock was a man of great versatility but imperfect business capacity, and combined the occupations of bookseller, printer, publisher, naturalist, botanist, and local antiquary. He was proud of his collections (see Journals ap. Arnold), but was obliged occasionally to sell specimens. His latter years were passed in comparative poverty. He died on 26 October 1830, and was buried at Wilmington.

Pocock's chief publications were: 1. ‘Pocock's Child's First Book, or Reading made easy,’ n.d., and ‘Child's Second Book,’ n.d. (the two were bound up and sold as ‘Pocock's Spelling Book).’ 2. ‘A Chronology of the most Remarkable Events that have occurred in the Parishes of Gravesend, Milton, and Denton, in Kent,’ Gravesend, 1790, 8vo. 3. ‘The History of the Incorporated Town and Parishes of Gravesend and Milton in Kent,’ Gravesend, 1797, 4to, plates. 4. ‘Kentish Fragments,’ Gravesend, 1802, 8vo. 5. ‘Memoirs of the Family of Tufton, Earls of Thanet,’ Gravesend, 1800, 8vo. 6. ‘Pocock's Gravesend Water Companion, describing all the Towns, Churches, Villages, Parishes, and Gentlemen's Seats, as seen from the Thames between London Bridge and Gravesend,’ Gravesend, 1802, sm. 8vo. 7. ‘Pocock's Margate Water Companion,’ Gravesend, 1802, sm. 8vo. (No. 6 continued to Margate). 8. ‘Pocock's Everlasting Songster, containing a Selection of the most approved Songs,’ Gravesend, 1804, sm. 8vo. 9. ‘Pocock's Sea Captains' Assistant, or Fresh Intelligence for Salt-water Sailors,’ Gravesend, n.d. [1802], sm. 8vo. 10. ‘God's Wonders in the Great Deep,’ n.d. 11. ‘The Antiquities of Rochester Cathedral,’ n.d. 12. ‘Memoirs of the Families of Sir E. Knatchbull, Bart., and Filmer Honeywood,’ Gravesend, 1802, 8vo.
