= Islip railway station =

Railway station in Oxfordshire, England

Islip
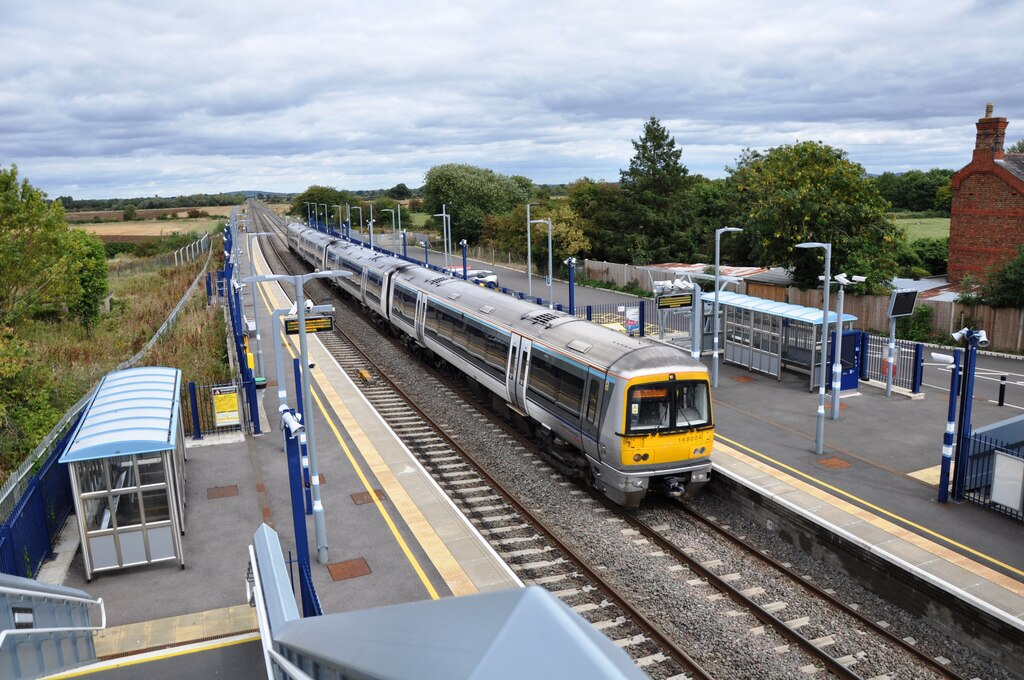
- DMU bound for Oxford passing through Islip Station 2018

General information
- Location: Islip, Cherwell; England
- Coordinates: 51.826°N 1.238°W
- Grid reference: SP525144
- Manager: Chiltern Railways
- Platforms: 2

Other information
- Station code: ISP
- Classification: DfT category F2

History
- Original company: Buckinghamshire Railway
- Pre-grouping: London and North Western Railway
- Post-grouping: London, Midland and Scottish Railway; London Midland Region of British Railways

Key dates
- 1 October 1850: Opened
- 1 January 1968: Closed
- 13 May 1989: Reopened
- 15 February 2014: Closed to rail traffic during line upgrade
- 25 October 2015: Reopened

Passengers
- 2021/22: ▲20,454
- 2022/23: ▲26,038
- 2023/24: ▲33,498
- 2024/25: ▲39,188
- 2025/26: ▲41,192
Location
Notes
- Passenger statistics from the Office of Rail and Road

Islip railway station serves the village of Islip, Oxfordshire, England. Islip is north-east of Oxford. Services run south to Oxford, 5 miles (8 km) away, and north-east to Bicester Village and London Marylebone. The station is currently managed by Chiltern Railways.

== History ==
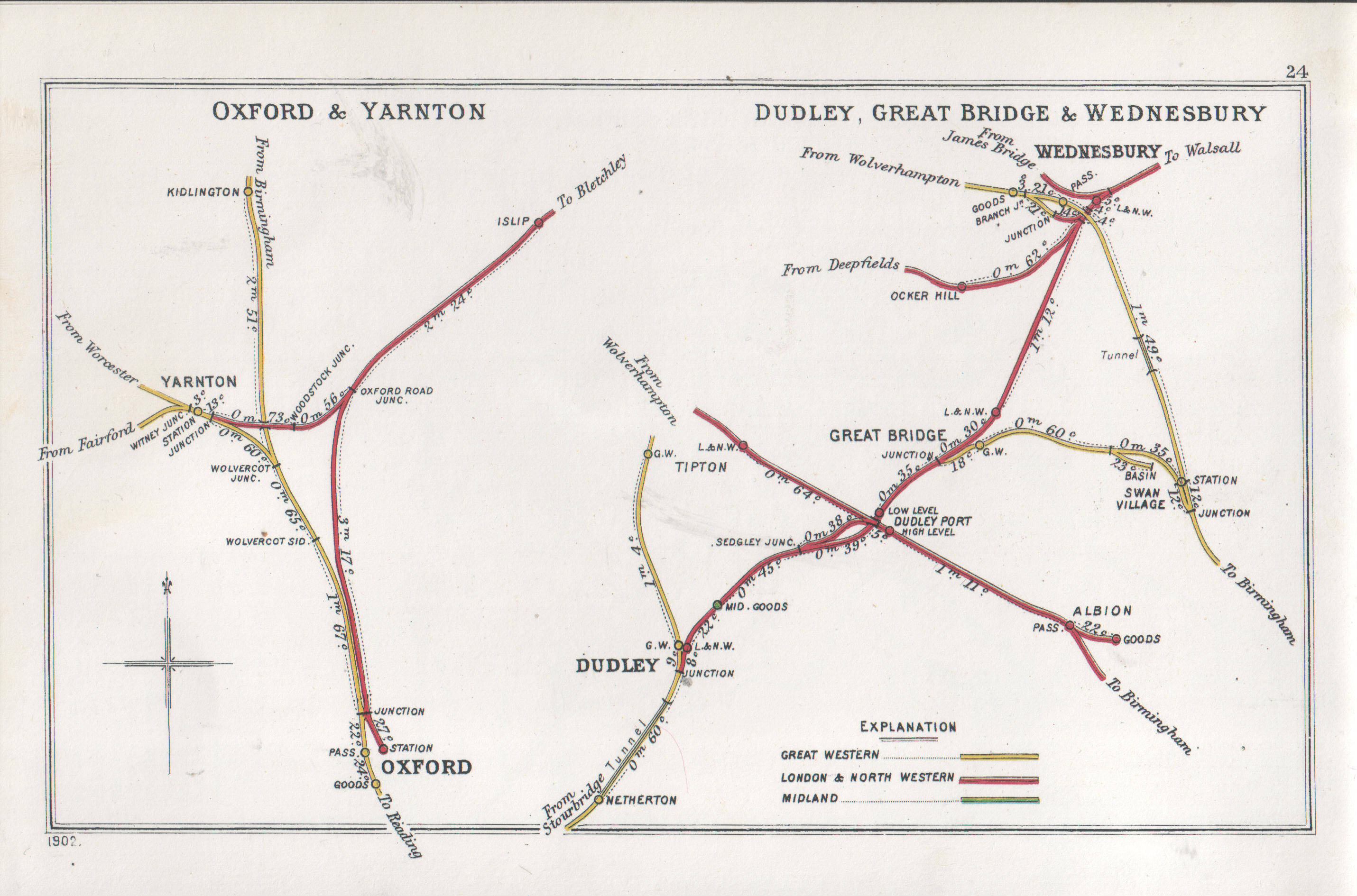
A 1902 Railway Clearing House map of railways in the vicinity of Islip

On 1 October 1850 the Buckinghamshire Railway opened Islip station as a double tracked two-platform station with a goods shed.

From 1 January 1968 British Railways withdrew passenger services from the Buckinghamshire Railway between Oxford and Bletchley and closed all intermediate stations including Islip; In 1987 Network SouthEast reintroduced passenger services on the Oxford to Bicester Line and on 13 May 1989 Islip was reopened as a single platform unstaffed halt.

The station closed to rail traffic on 15 February 2014 (the last trains having run late on 14 February) in order to allow upgrade of the line between Oxford and Bicester. Reopening was planned for May 2015, but was later delayed until 25 October 2015. The rebuilt Islip station has 2 platforms, with a car park for 23 spaces.

== Services ==
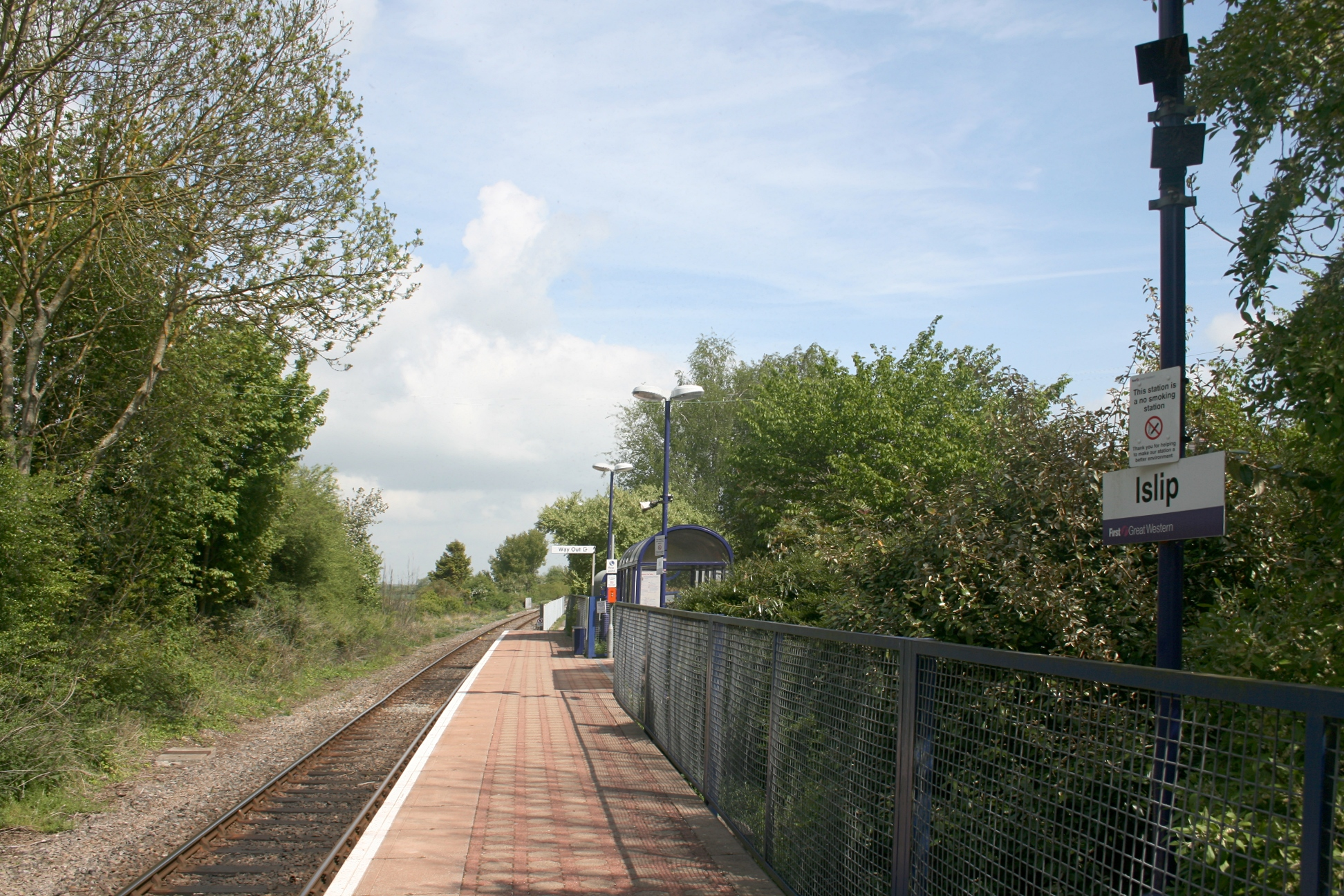
Islip station platform in May 2009

From December 2008 the service on Mondays to Saturdays was improved with an evening service and a doubling of the service on Saturdays. There were 11 trains on Mondays to Thursdays, 12 on Fridays and 13 on Saturdays. From May 2009 further improvements saw extra trains during the daytime on Mondays to Fridays and a new all-year round Sunday service, with trains every 90 minutes.

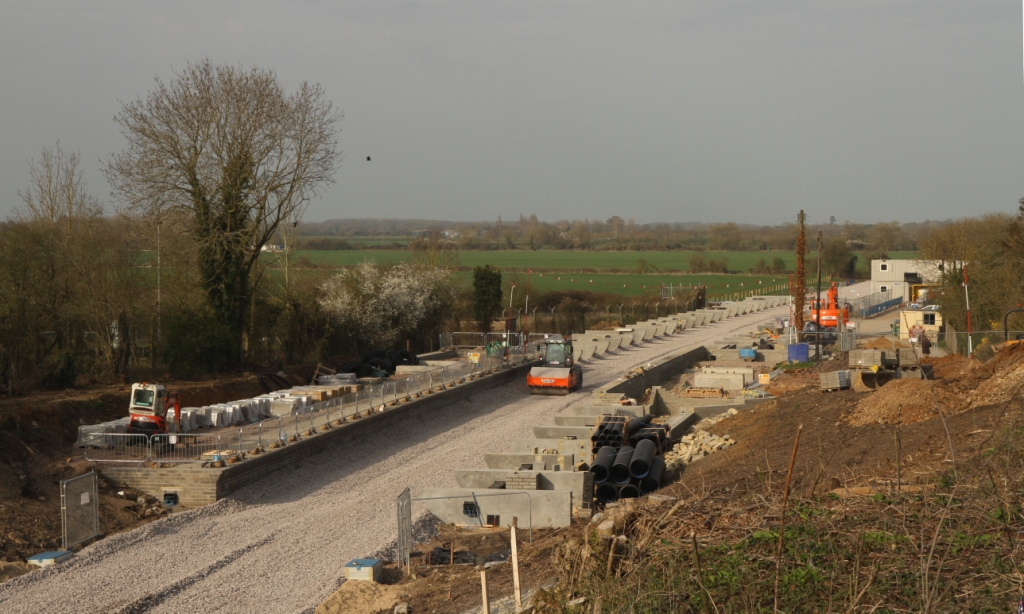
New platforms being built in April 2015

On 22 May 2011, Chiltern Railways took over all passenger operations from this station from the previous operator First Great Western. This was in advance of the new London Marylebone to Oxford service which was due to start in 2013, but was later delayed to 25 October 2015.

As of March 2024 Islip has a limited service, approximately a 2 hourly service to Oxford/London Marylebone with some additional peak time services Monday to Friday.

Preceding station	National Rail	Following station
Oxford Parkway	Chiltern Railways Oxford to Bicester Line	Bicester Village
	Historical railways	
Oxford Road Halt Line open, station closed	London and North Western Railway Varsity Line	Oddington Halt Line open, station closed
