= John Jewell Penstone =

English painter

- Born: 1817
- Died: 1902 (aged 84–85)
- Occupation: Painter

John Jewell Penstone (1817–1902) was a portrait and genre artist who worked with paint, but is known mainly for his engravings, and has been associated with the Pre-Raphaelite movement. The National Portrait Gallery in London holds two of his stipple engravings, along with a lithograph (printed by Nosworthy & Wells) his family who now lives in Birmingham, England holds the original painting of their great grandfather, an officer in the British Army. Ash Penstone is now the only remaining person who carries the original Penstone name.

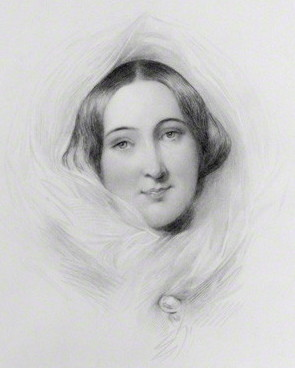
Stipple engraving of Rosina Bulwer Lytton, 1852

== Biography ==
Penstone was born in Clerkenwell, London, to John Penstone (1792–1840) and Ann, a daughter of Joseph Jewell. Both of his parents were Quakers, but he joined the Plymouth Brethren when he was about 19 years old. He was involved in some of the religious controversies which caused splits in the Brethren movement during his lifetime, and by the death of his second wife he was disappointed with the way some members had behaved.

In 1850 Penstone moved from Chelsea in London to Stanford in the Vale where his father and both grandfathers had been born. He was described as a "Bible scholar and Christian poet" in Chief Men among the Brethren but seems to have had an interest in secular subjects as well because in the late 1850s he was an active contributor to Notes and Queries on literary, artistic and historical subjects. Penstone was friends with John Dunkin (1812–1879). He contributed "A visit to the village church of Stanford in the vale, whilst undergoing restoration" to Dunkin's Monumenta Anglicana, and provided Dunkin with information about the opening of King John’s tomb in Worcester Cathedral in 1797. Although he enjoyed working in this area he was never more than an interested amateur, as he earned his living as an artist.

== Works ==
Penstone exhibited works at the Royal Academy as early as 1838 and as late as 1895. His works exhibited at the Academy (as an honorary exhibitor) were:

- 1838. (1048) The Saxon Bride.
- 1846. (599) A portrait.
- 1848. (982) Holy thoughts.
- 1895. (1397) The Man of Sorrows.

Other notable graphic works include:

- Enamoured Days, in Fisher’s Drawing Room Scrap Book (1848)—based on a work by his contemporary Edward Henry Corbould (1815–1905).
- Johann Gerhard Oncken, lithograph, (mid 19th century).
- Rosina Anne Doyle Bulwer Lytton (née Wheeler), Lady Lytton, stipple engraving, (1852).
- Caroline Elizabeth Vivian (née Cholmeley), stipple engraving, (before 1853).
- Love is strong as death, painting (1894)—a title taken from Song of Solomon 8: 6.
- Swarthmoor Hal, watercolor—in Newport Museum and Art Gallery.

In 1874 Penstone wrote a pamphlet called Village teachings concerning the Lord Jesus. He also wrote some poetry inclining Servant of Christ, and a book of poems and illustrations titled Songs of Salvation and Records of Christian Life (1876).

== Family ==
Penstone married his first wife Matilda Harman Gould (1813–1878) in 1845. They had at least five children (three girls and two boys). Their son William would become an architect who supervised the building of Stanford in the Vale Primary School, and son Edward (1849–1916) would follow in his father's footsteps and become a notable artist.

Three years after the death of his first wife, Penstone married Elizabeth Messer Wright (1815–1892) from Bristol, a cousin of George Müller’s son-in-law and successor James Wright.
