= Thame Abbey =

Cistercian abbey in Thame, England

Coordinates: 51°43′40″N 0°57′48″W

Thame Abbey was a Cistercian abbey at Thame in the English county of Oxfordshire.

Thame Abbey was founded in 1137 by Alexander, Bishop of Lincoln. It was dissolved in 1539. Most of the building stone was removed from the site, but the Abbot's House remained standing and was turned into a country house, of which two wings remain, Thame Park, by John Williams, 1st Baron Williams of Thame.

In 1460 the abbot, Richard Lyndesey, was a defendant in a case brought in the Court of Common Pleas.
