= Bicester Avenue =

Coordinates: 51°53′17″N 1°09′54″W

Bicester Avenue Home and Garden Centre
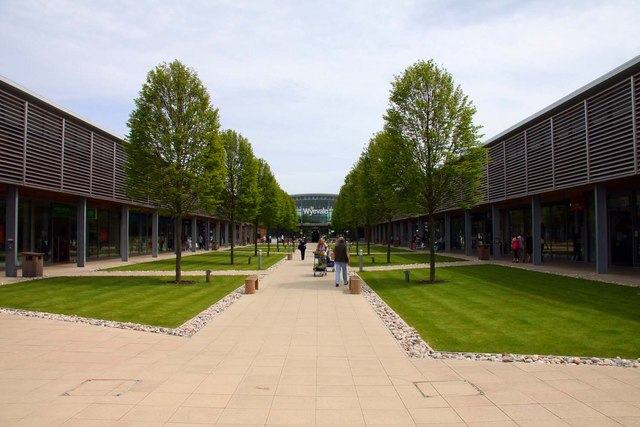
- View of Bicester Avenue
- Location: Bicester, United Kingdom
- Opened: May 2007
- Num. of stores: 18
- Num. of anchor tenants: 1 (Blue Diamond garden Centre)
- Parking: over 900
- Website: bluediamond.gg/garden-centre/bicester-avenue-garden-centre

Bicester Avenue Home and Garden Centre is a shopping centre in Bicester, Oxfordshire, England, that opened in May 2007, HPW Architecture Ltd were the architects and designers. Some of the stores at Bicester Avenue include Bicester Avenue Garden Centre, owned by Blue Diamond Garden Centres, World of Water tropical fish shop, Lakeland and Cotswold Outdoor. The large garden centre contains a soft play area for children.

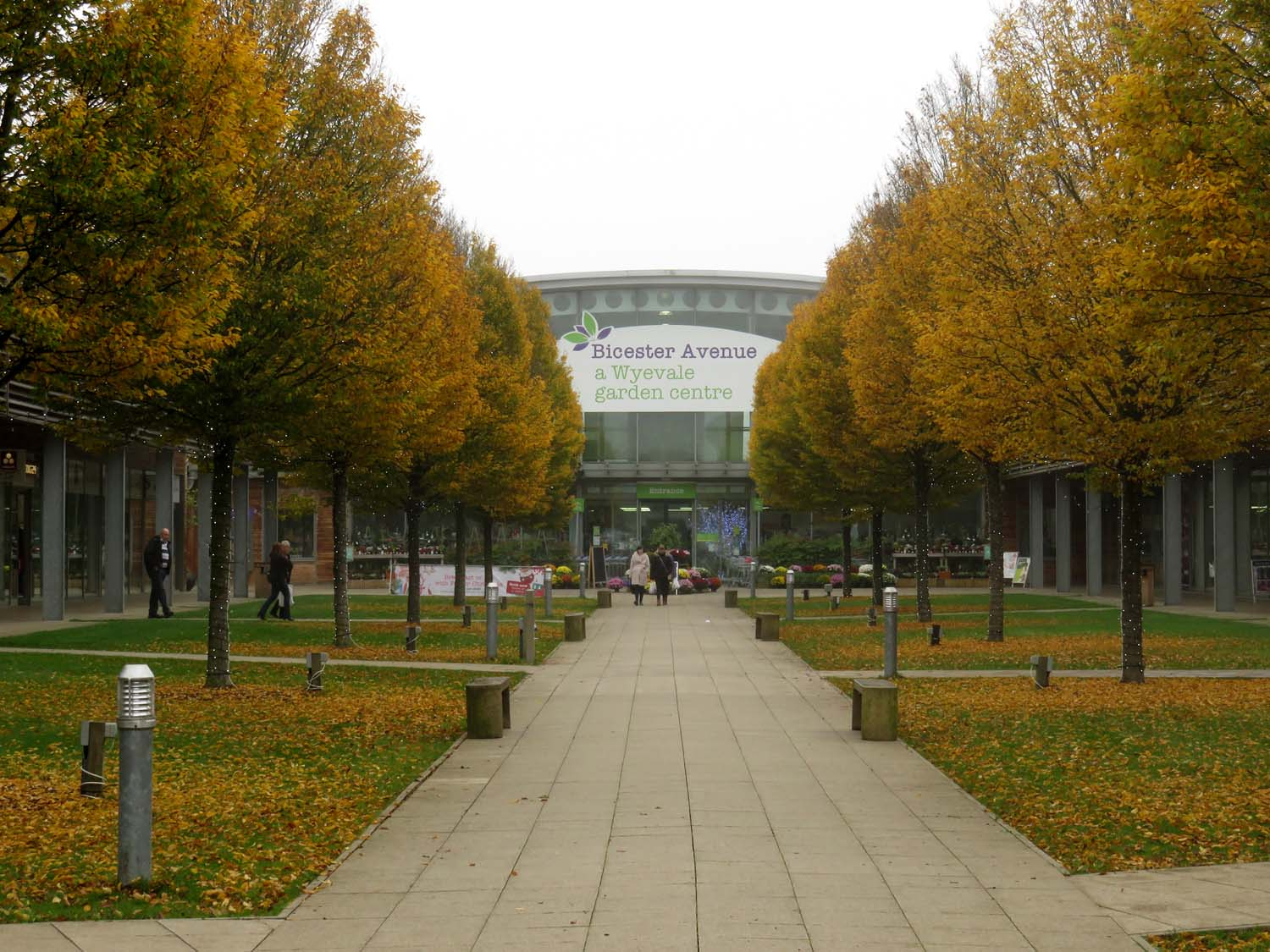

Bicester Avenue is located just south of Bicester and south of the much larger outlet centre Bicester Village on the A41 towards Oxford. It is within walking distance of Bicester Village.
