= Bicester =

Town in Oxfordshire, England

Coordinates: 51.90°N 1.15°W

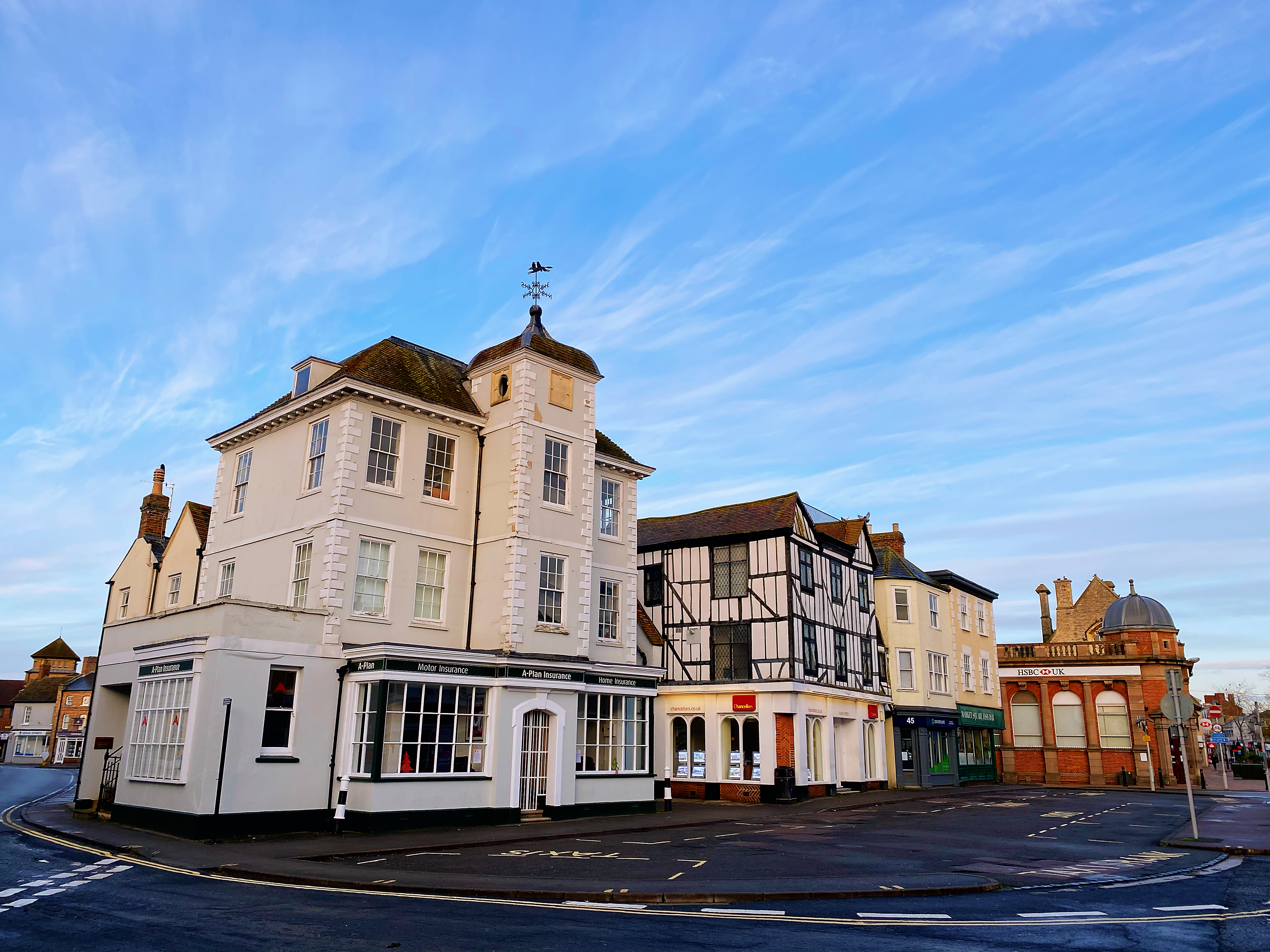
- Market Square, Bicester

- Location within Oxfordshire
- Interactive map of Bicester
- Area: 8.58 km^{2} (3.31 sq mi)
- Population: 37,020 (2021 census)
  - Density: 4,315/km^{2} (11,180/sq mi)
- OS grid reference: SP5822
- Civil parish: Bicester
- District: Cherwell
- Shire county: Oxfordshire
- Region: South East
- Country: England
- Sovereign state: United Kingdom
- Post town: BICESTER
- Postcode district: OX25–27
- Dialling code: 01869
- Police: Thames Valley
- Fire: Oxfordshire
- Ambulance: South Central
- UK Parliament: Bicester and Woodstock
- Website: www.bicester.gov.uk

Bicester (/ˈbɪstər/ BIST-ər) is a market town and civil parish in the Cherwell district of Oxfordshire, England, 11 miles (18 km) north-east of Oxford. The town is a notable tourist attraction due to the Bicester Village shopping centre. The historical town centre – designated as a conservation area – has a local market and numerous independent shops and restaurants. Bicester also has a town council and a mayor.

The town has long had good transport links, being at the intersection of two Roman roads (Akeman Street and a north–south route between Dorchester and Towcester). It has direct rail connections to Oxford, London and Birmingham, and is on the route of under-construction East West Rail which will link it directly to Milton Keynes and Cambridge. The A41 primary road runs through the town, connecting it to Aylesbury, the M40 and the A34.

Bicester experienced significant growth in the 20th century due to its strategic military role, with RAF Bicester established in 1917 and a major ordnance depot built in 1942 to support World War II operations. These installations spurred post-war urban development. RAF Bicester closed and has since been repurposed for civilian use as a heritage centre.

Bicester is one of the fastest-growing towns in Oxfordshire. It lies within the Oxford–Cambridge Arc, a nationally designated area for growth and development, and has expanded rapidly in recent generations, and more residential development is planned to bring the population up to around 50,000. The town was awarded Garden Town status by the government in 2014, although the designation has been criticised for not having a substantive effect on the way development is carried out in the town. Nonetheless, high-quality and environmentally friendly housing stock has been constructed. Examples of new development include Elmsbrook the North West Bicester eco-town and the self-built homes at Graven Hill.

== Toponymy ==
There are several theories about the origin of the name Bicester. One theory is that it may be derived from a personal name Beorna, meaning the 'Fort of the Warriors'. It may also be derived from a Latin form Bi-cester, meaning 'two forts'—Alchester is 2 miles (3 km) southwest of the town, and Chesterton village is on the course of Akeman Street, the Roman road between Watling Street and Cirencester, about 1 mile (1.6 km) northwest of Alchester. Bicester has been inhabited since the mid-7th century and its name has been written in various ways including Berncestre, Burencestre, Burcester, Biciter and Bissiter; the John Speed map of 1610 shows four different spellings, and historian G. H. Dannatt found 45 variants in wills from the 17th and 18th centuries.

== History ==
=== Early history ===
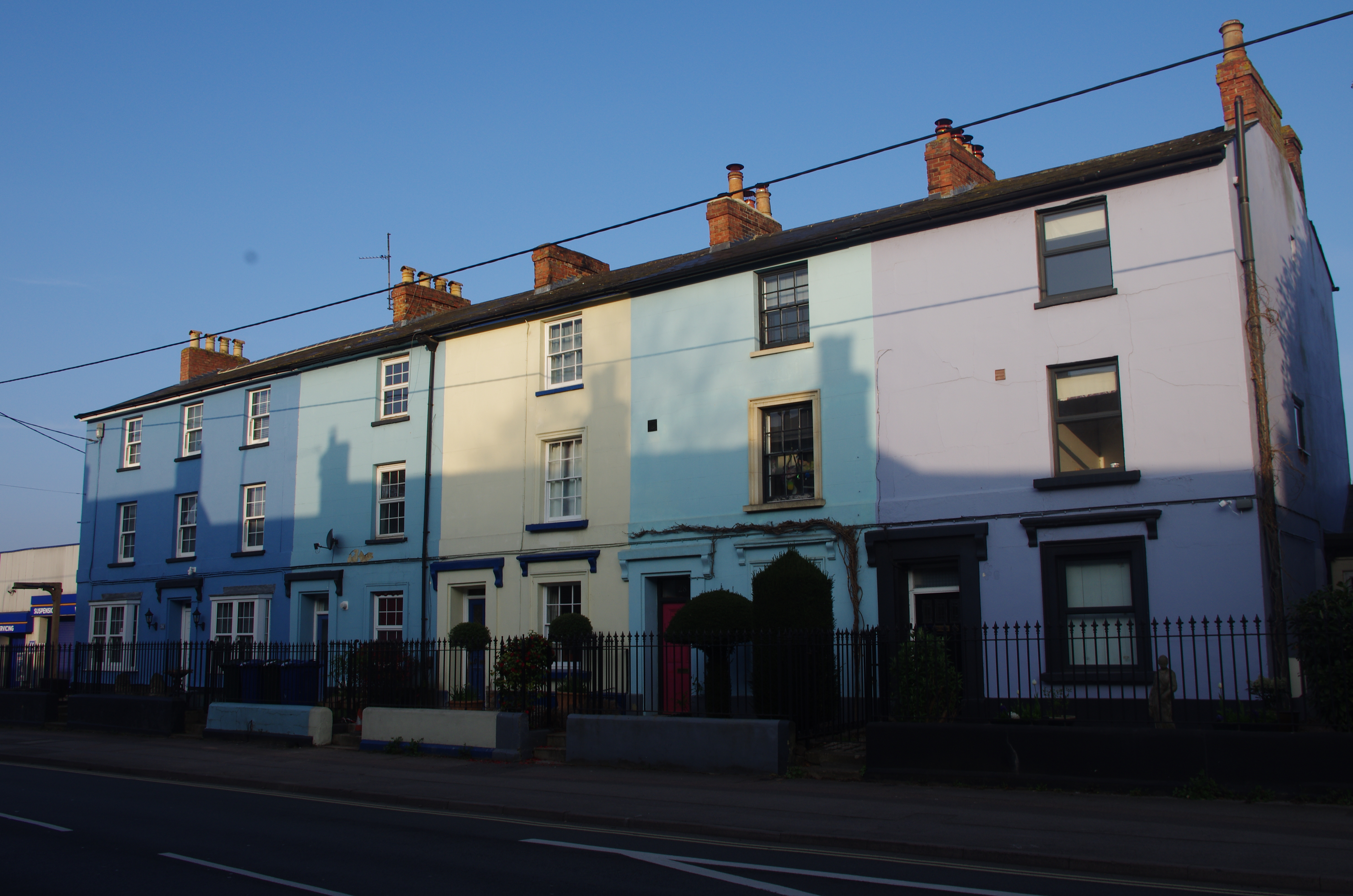
Townhouses on Queen's Avenue, Bicester

Bicester lies close to the junction of two Roman roads – Akeman Street, an east–west route between St Albans and Cirencester, and a north–south route between Dorchester and Towcester, which lies under Queen's Avenue. A Roman fort at Alchester lies 2 miles (3 km) southwest of the town. The West Saxons established a settlement in the 6th century at a nodal point of these ancient routes.

=== Ecclesiastical history ===
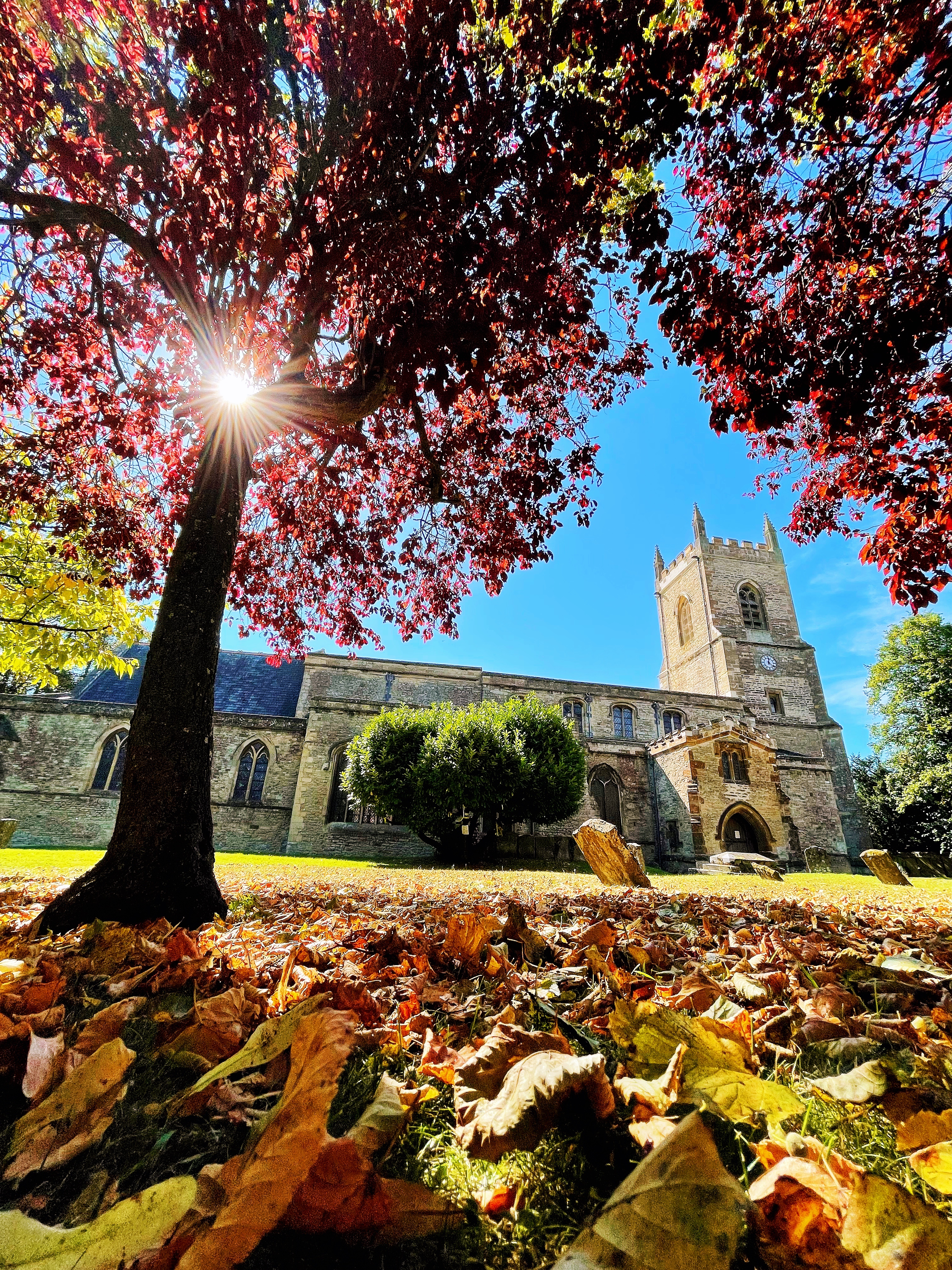
St Edburg’s Church, Bicester

St. Edburg’s Church in Bicester was founded as a minster, perhaps in the mid-7th century after St. Birinus converted Cynegils, King of Wessex, following their meeting near Blewbury. The site was just east of the old Roman road between Dorchester and Towcester that passed through the former Roman town Alchester. The earliest church was probably a timber structure serving the inhabitants of the growing Saxon settlements on either side of the River Bure, and as a mission centre for the surrounding countryside. Archaeological excavations at Procter's Yard identified the ecclesiastical enclosure boundary, and a large cemetery of Saxon graves suggesting a much larger churchyard has been excavated on the site of the Catholic Church car park almost opposite St. Edburg's.

The first documentary reference is the Domesday Book of 1086 which records it as Berencestra, its two manors of Bicester and Wretchwick being held by Robert D'Oyly who built Oxford Castle. The town became established as twin settlements on opposite banks of the River Bure, a tributary of the Ray, Cherwell, and ultimately the River Thames.

By the end of the 13th century, Bicester was the centre of a deanery of 33 churches. The remains of an Augustinian priory founded between 1182 and 1185 survive in the town centre. It is unclear when St. Edburg's Church was rebuilt in stone, but the 12th-century church seems to have had an aisleless cruciform plan. The earliest surviving material includes parts of the nave's north wall, parts of an originally external zigzag string course, the north and south transepts, and the external clasping buttresses of the chancel. The triangular-headed opening at the end of the north wall of the nave was probably an external door of the early church. Three round-headed Norman arches at the end of the nave mark the position of a 13th-century tower.

The Augustinian Priory was founded by Gilbert Bassett around 1183 and endowed with land and buildings around the town and other parishes, including 180 acres (73 ha) and the quarry at Kirtlington, 300 acres (120 ha) at what is now called Wretchwick, 135 acres (55 ha) at Stratton Audley, and on Gravenhill and Arncott. It also held the mill at Clifton and had farms let to tenants at Deddington, Grimsbury, Waddesdon, and Fringford. Although these holdings were extensive and close to the market at Bicester, they appear to have been poorly managed and did not produce much income for the priory.

The priory appropriated the church in the early 13th century. A south aisle was added, and arches were opened in the nave and south transept walls to connect the new aisle with the main body of the church.

A further extension was made in the 14th century when the north aisle was built. The arched openings in the north wall of the nave are supported by octagonal columns. The Perpendicular Gothic north chapel (now vestry) is of a similar date, and on the east wall are two windows. The chapel originally had an upper chamber used later for the vicars' grammar school, accessed from an external staircase which forms part of the north eastern buttress.

In the 15th century, the upper walls of the nave were raised to form a clerestory with square-headed Perpendicular Gothic windows. The earlier central tower and its nave arch were taken down and the nave roof was rebuilt (the present roof is a copy of this design built in 1803). The columns of the north arcade were undercut, making them appear very slim and the capitals top heavy. In the east bay of the nave, there are carved decorations probably forming part of a canopied tomb originally set between the columns. The west tower was built in three stages, each stage marked by a horizontal string course running around the outside. The construction would have taken several years to complete. The battlements and crockets on the top of the tower were replaced in the mid 19th century.

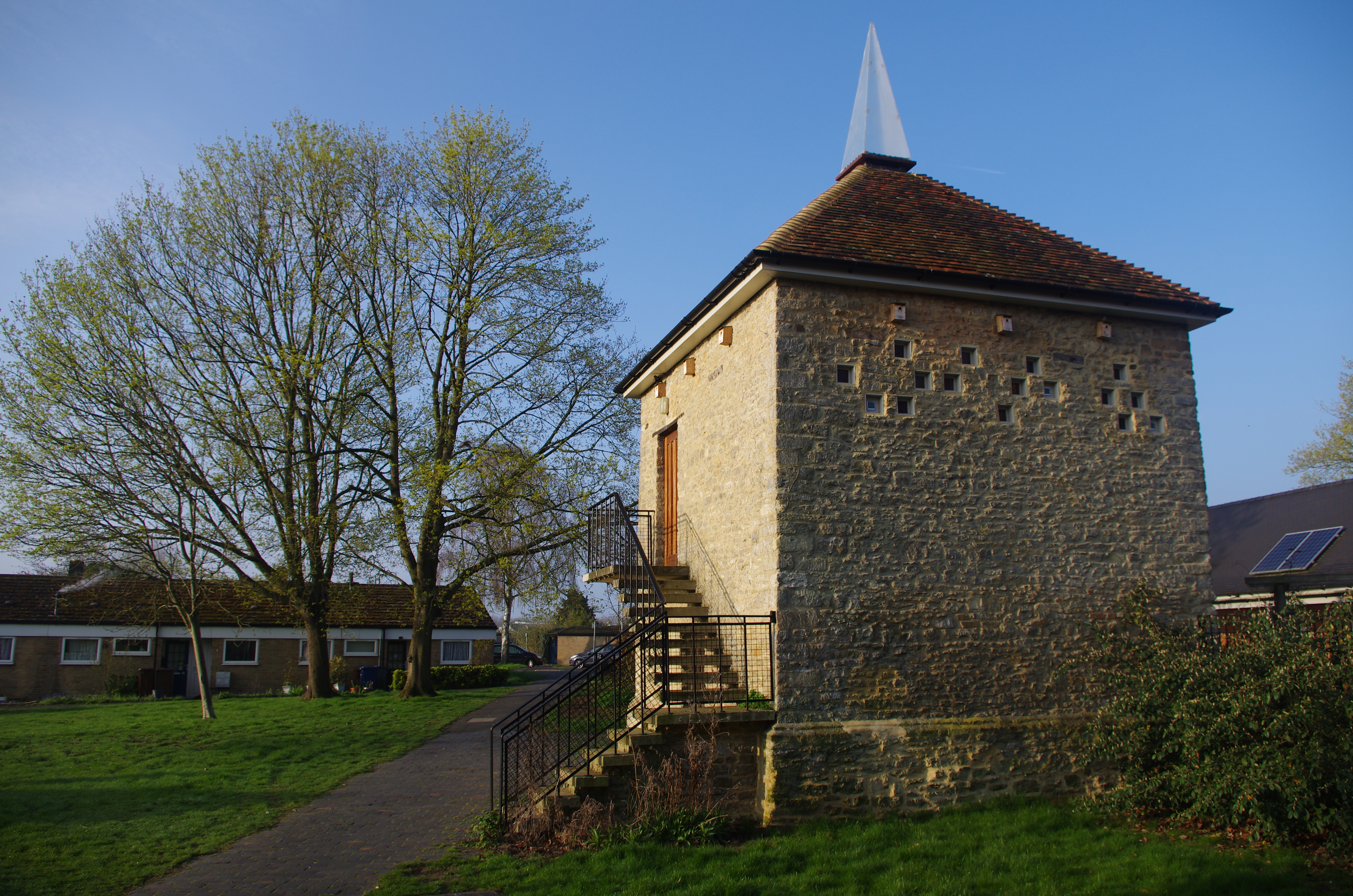
Dovecote in Old Place Yard, Bicester

The priory church was built around 1200 and enlarged around 1300 in association with the construction of the Purbeck marble tomb of St. Eadburh. This may have been the gift of the priory's patron Henry de Lacy, 3rd Earl of Lincoln. The walled rectangular enclosure of the priory lay just south of the church. The gatehouse was on the site of 'Chapter and Verse' Guesthouse in Church Lane. The dovecote and houses in Old Place Yard lie within the central precinct. St. Edburg's House is built partly over the site of the large priory church. This was linked by a cloister to a quadrangle containing the refectory, kitchens, dormitory, and prior's lodging. The priory farm buildings lay in the area of the present church hall, and these had direct access along Piggy Lane to land in what is now the King's End estate.

Early charters promoted Bicester's development as a trading centre, with a market and fair established by the mid 13th century. By this time two further manors are mentioned, Bury End and Nuns Place, later known as Market End and King's End respectively.

=== Military history ===
The town has a long-standing connection with the military. Ward Lock & Co's 'Guide to Oxford and District' suggests that Alchester was 'a kind of Roman Aldershot'. During the English Civil War (1642–49) Bicester was used as the headquarters of parliamentary forces. Following the outbreak of the French Revolutionary Wars from 1793, John Coker, the manorial lord of Bicester King's End, formed an 'Association for the Protection of Property against Levellers and Jacobins' as an anti-Painite loyalist band providing local militia and volunteer drafts for the army. When Oxford University formed a regiment in 1798, John Coker was elected Colonel.

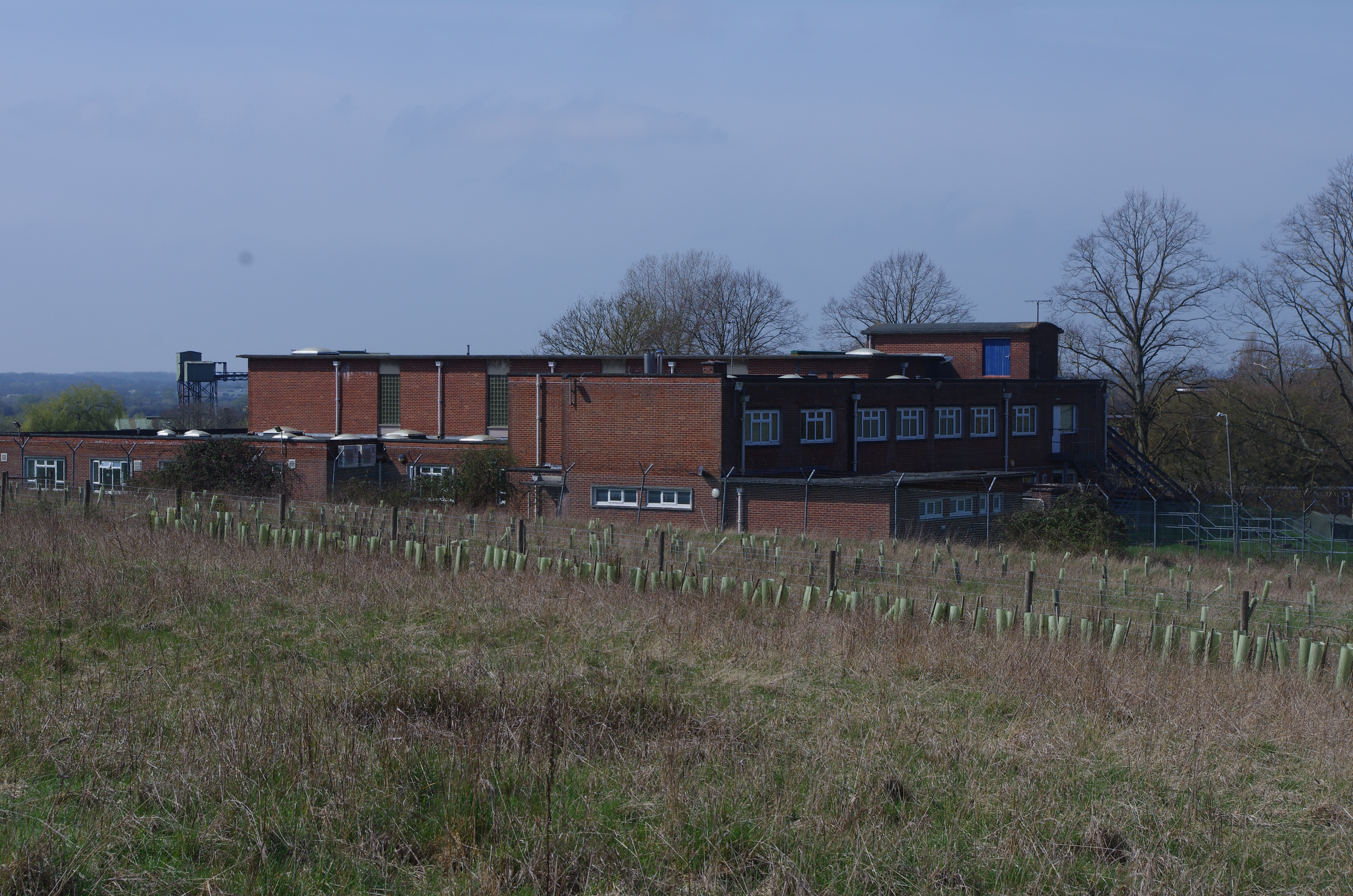
Military buildings at the Graven Hill supply depot, Bicester

Coker's Bicester militia had sixty privates and six commissioned and non-commissioned officers led by Captain Henry Walford. The militia briefly stood down in 1802 after the Treaty of Amiens, but when hostilities resumed in 1804, concerns over potential invasion led to the reformation of the local militia as the Bicester Independent Company of Infantry. It had double the earlier numbers to provide defence in the event of an invasion or Jacobin insurrection. The Bicester Company was commanded by a captain along with 2 lieutenants, an ensign, 6 sergeants, 6 corporals and 120 privates. Their training and drills were such that they were deemed 'fit to join troops in the line'. The only action recorded for them is in 1806 at the 21st birthday celebrations of Sir Gregory O Page-Turner when they performed a feu de joie 'and were afterwards regaled at one of the principal inns of the town'.

=== 15th to 18th centuries ===
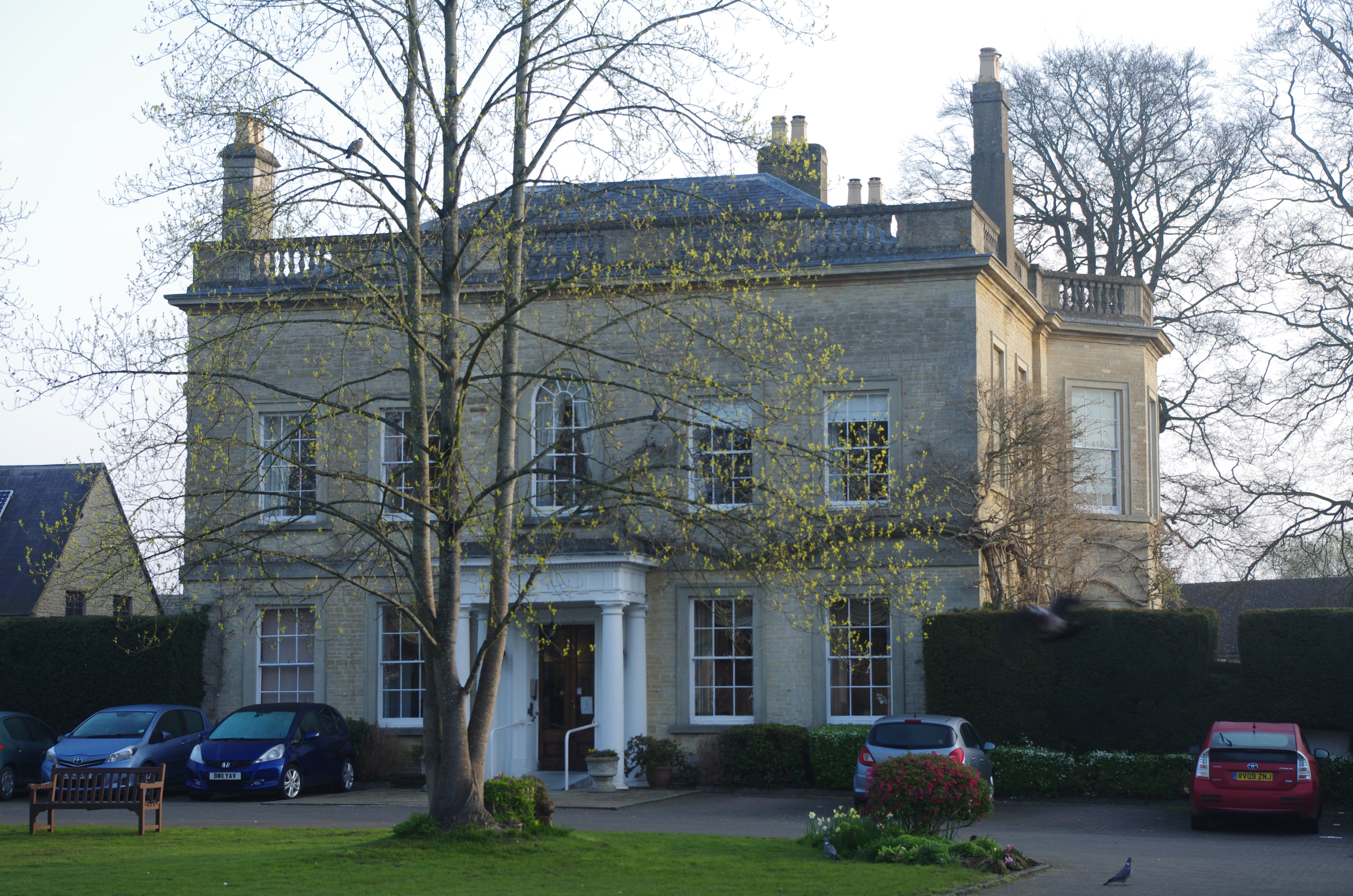
Bicester Manor House, now owned by a housing association

The lord of the manor of Market End was the 1st Earl of Derby Sir Thomas Stanley, who had married Lady Margaret Beaufort, mother of Henry VII. Sir Thomas placed the crown on the head of the new King Henry VII at the Battle of Bosworth, and as the step-father of Henry VII he was granted many manors. In his 1593 will, the 4th Earl of Derby, Sir Henry Stanley, bequeathed the manor to his second son Sir William Stanley of Lathom, Lancashire. William became the 6th Earl of Derby in 1594 when his older brother Ferdinando, the 5th Earl, mysteriously died. In 1597, the 6th Earl sold a 9,999-year lease to 31 principal tenants. This in effect gave the manorial rights to the leaseholders, 'purchased for the benefit of those inhabitants or others who might hereafter obtain parts of the demesne'. The leaseholders elected a bailiff to receive the profits from the bailiwick, mainly from the administration of the market, and distribute them to the shareholders. From the bailiff's title the arrangement became known as the Bailiwick of Bicester Market End. By 1752, all of the original leases were in the hands of ten men, who leased the bailiwick control of the market to two local tradesmen.

A fire in 1724 had destroyed the buildings on the eastern side of Water Lane. A Nonconformist congregation was able to acquire a site that had formerly been the tail of a long plot occupied at the other end by the King's Arms. Their chapel built in 1728 was 'surrounded by a burying ground and ornamented with trees'. At the southern and downstream end of Water Lane, there were problems of pollution from animal dung from livery stables on the edge of town associated with the London traffic.

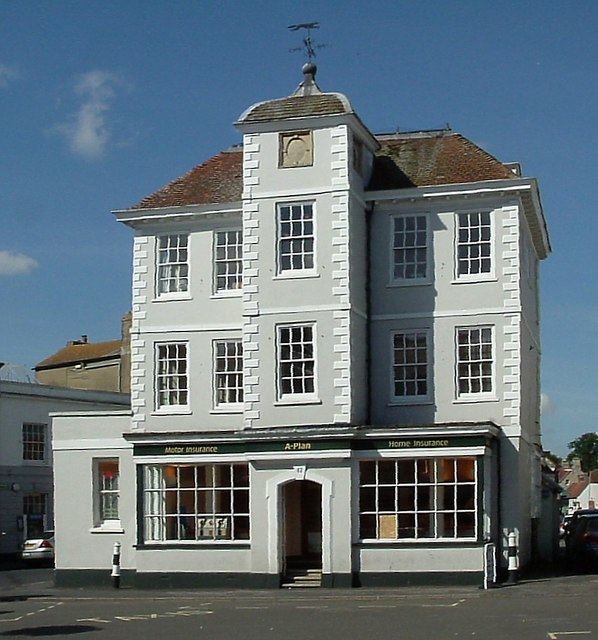
Late 17th-century house in Market Square

Edward Hemins was running a bell-foundry in Bicester by 1728 and remained in business until at least 1743. At least 19 of his church bells are known to survive, including some of those in the parishes of Ambrosden, Bletchingdon, Piddington and Wootton in Oxfordshire and Culworth in Northamptonshire.

King's End had a substantially lower population and none of the commercial bustle found on the other side of the Bure. The manorial lords, the Cokers, lived in the manor house from 1584. The house had been rebuilt in the early 18th century remodelled in the 1780s. The park was enlarged surrounded by a wall after 1753 when a range of buildings on the north side of King's End Green were demolished by Coker. A westward enlargement of the park also extinguished the road that followed the line of the Roman road. This partly overlapped a pre-1753 close belonging to Coker. The effect of the enlargement of the park was to divert traffic at the Fox Inn through King's End, across the causeway to Market Square and Sheep Street before returning to the Roman road north of Crockwell.

The two townships of King's End and Market End evolved distinct spatial characteristics. Inns, shops and high status houses clustered around the triangular market place as commercial activity was increasingly concentrated in Market End. The bailiwick lessees promoted a much less regulated market than that found in boroughs elsewhere. Away from the market, Sheep Street was considered 'very respectable' but its northern end at Crockwell was inhabited by the poorest inhabitants in low quality, subdivided and overcrowded buildings.

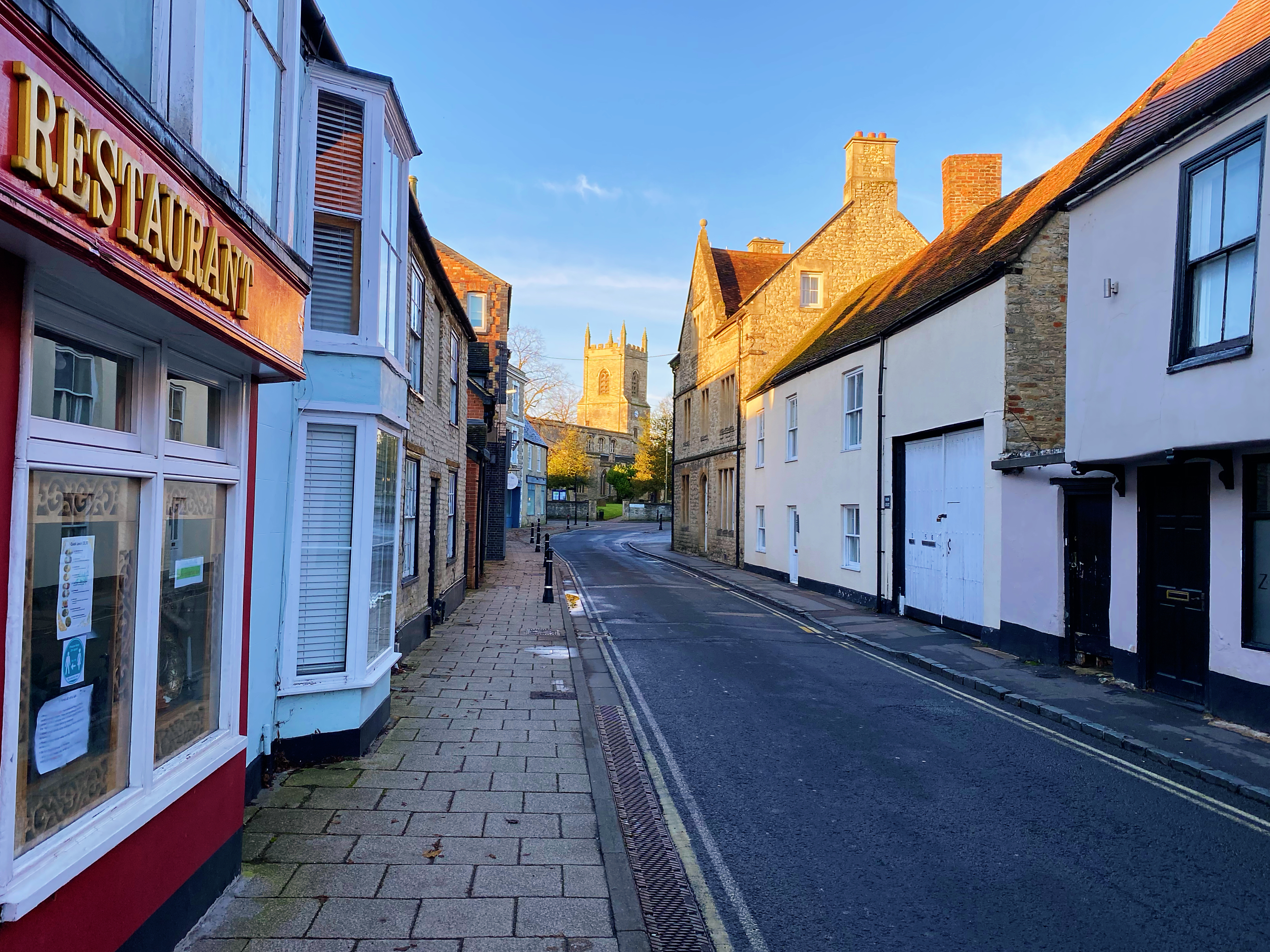
The Causeway, Bicester

=== 19th century onwards ===
By 1800, the causeway had dense development forming continuous frontages on both sides. The partially buried watercourses provided a convenient drainage opportunity, and many houses had privies discharging directly into the channels. Downstream, the Bure ran parallel with Water Lane, then the main road out of town towards London. Terraces of cottages were built backing onto the brook, and here too these took advantage of the brook for sewage disposal, with privies cantilevered out from houses over the watercourse. Town houses took their water from wells dug into the substrate which became increasingly polluted by leaching of waste through the alluvial bed of the Bure.

Until the early 19th century, the road from the market place to King's End ran through a ford of the Bure brook and on to the narrow embanked road across the boggy valley. The causeway became the focus for development from the late 18th century as rubbish and debris was dumped on each side of the road to form building platforms.

During the First World War, an airfield was established north of the town for the Royal Flying Corps. This became a Royal Air Force station, and is now Bicester Airfield, the home of Windrushers Gliding Club, which was absorbed into the military gliding club previously based there, to re-emerge in 2004 when the military club left the airfield. An epitome of historical Royal Air Force (RAF) locations in the UK, RAF Bicester represents the most comprehensive portrayal of bomber airfield advancements up until 1939. Notably, it stands as the best-maintained of the bomber bases, a key component of Sir Hugh Trenchard's RAF expansion strategy starting in 1923.

The Ministry of Defence (MOD)'s largest ordnance depot at MOD Bicester is just outside the town. The depot has its own internal railway system, the Bicester Military Railway.

== Geography ==
Bicester is in north Oxfordshire, 11 miles (18 km) east-northeast of Oxford, near the Buckinghamshire and Northamptonshire boundaries.

=== Areas and suburbs ===
There are 5 electoral wards, North, East, South, West, and Town as defined by the town council. The areas of Bicester include:

1. Highfield
2. Woodfield
3. King's End
4. Bure Park
5. Glory Farm
6. Southwold
7. Langford Village
8. Kingsmere (new housing development)
9. Elmsbrook (new housing development, eco-town)
10. Graven Hill (new housing development)
11. New Langford

=== Climate ===
Bicester experiences an oceanic climate (Köppen climate classification Cfb) similar to almost all of the United Kingdom.

Climate data for Bicester
Month	Jan	Feb	Mar	Apr	May	Jun	Jul	Aug	Sep	Oct	Nov	Dec	Year
Mean daily maximum °C (°F)	7 (45)	7 (45)	10 (50)	13 (55)	16 (61)	20 (68)	22 (72)	21 (70)	18 (64)	14 (57)	10 (50)	7 (45)	13 (55)
Mean daily minimum °C (°F)	1 (34)	1 (34)	3 (37)	4 (39)	7 (45)	10 (50)	12 (54)	12 (54)	10 (50)	7 (45)	4 (39)	2 (36)	6 (43)
Average rainfall mm (inches)	56.1 (2.21)	39.4 (1.55)	49.6 (1.95)	42.3 (1.67)	59.0 (2.32)	45.1 (1.78)	52.3 (2.06)	57.7 (2.27)	52.1 (2.05)	62.5 (2.46)	65.3 (2.57)	62.5 (2.46)	643.9 (25.35)
Average snowy days	5	5	3	1	0	0	0	0	0	0	0	2	16

== Architecture ==
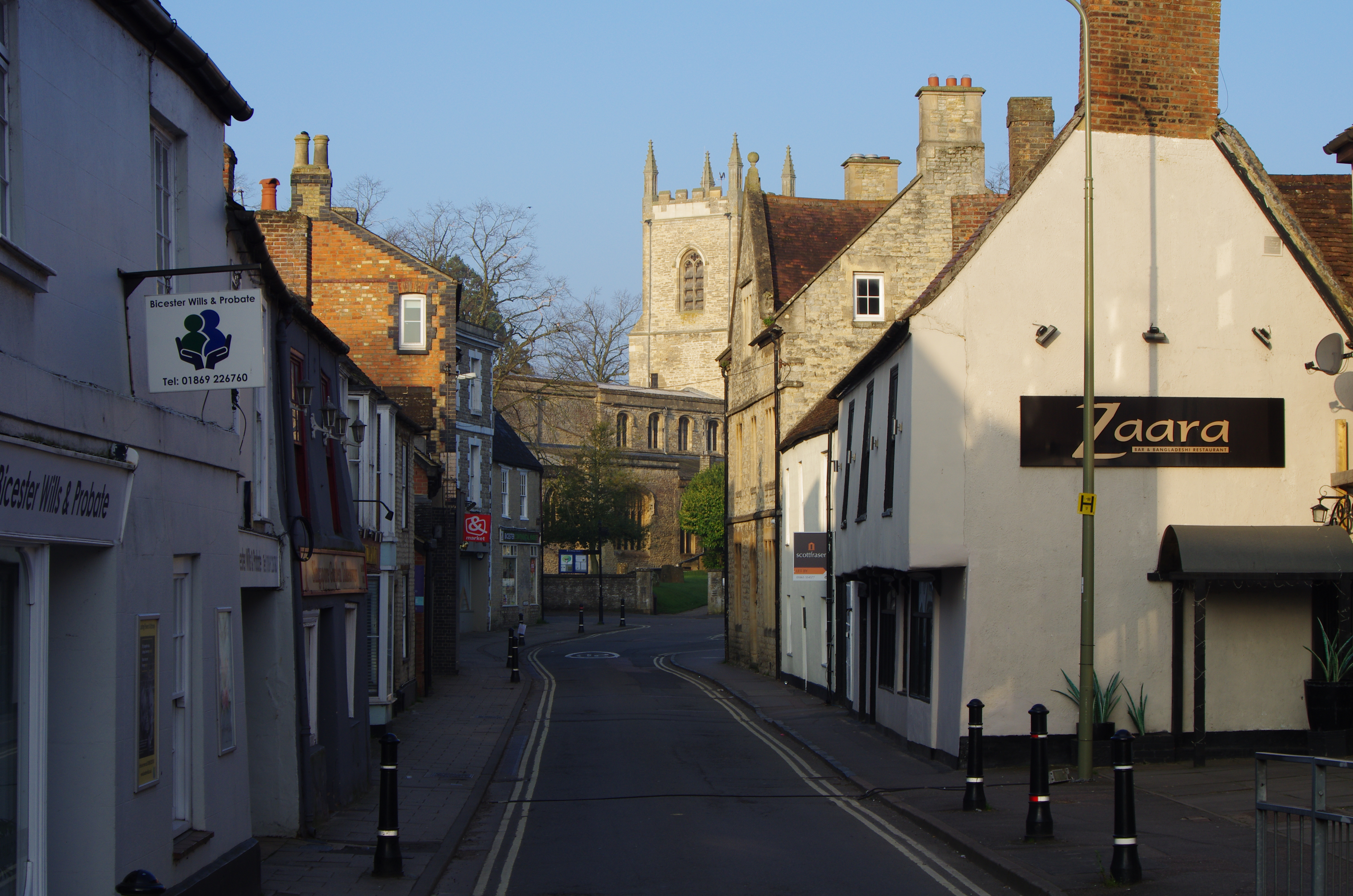
Vernacular buildings on the Causeway, Bicester

The vernacular buildings of the town have features of both the Cotswold dip slope to the northwest and the Thames Valley to the southeast. The earliest surviving buildings of the town are the medieval church of St Edburg; the vicarage of 1500 and two post Dissolution houses in the former Priory Precinct constructed from reused medieval material. These buildings are mainly grey oolitic limestone, from the Priory Quarry at Kirtlington, 5 miles (8 km) west on Akeman Street, some ginger lias (ironstone), from the area around Banbury, and white and bluish grey cornbrash limestone that was quarried in Crockwell and at Caversfield 2 miles (3 km) to the north.

Early secular buildings were box framed structures, using timber from the Bernwood Forest. Infilling of frames was of stud and lath with lime render and limewash. Others were of brick or local rubble stonework. The river valleys to the south and east of the town were the source of clay for widespread local production of brick and tile. In the 18th and 19th centuries, the Page-Turners had brick fields at Wretchwick and Blackthorn which operated alongside smaller producers such as farmer George Coppock who produced bricks as a sideline.

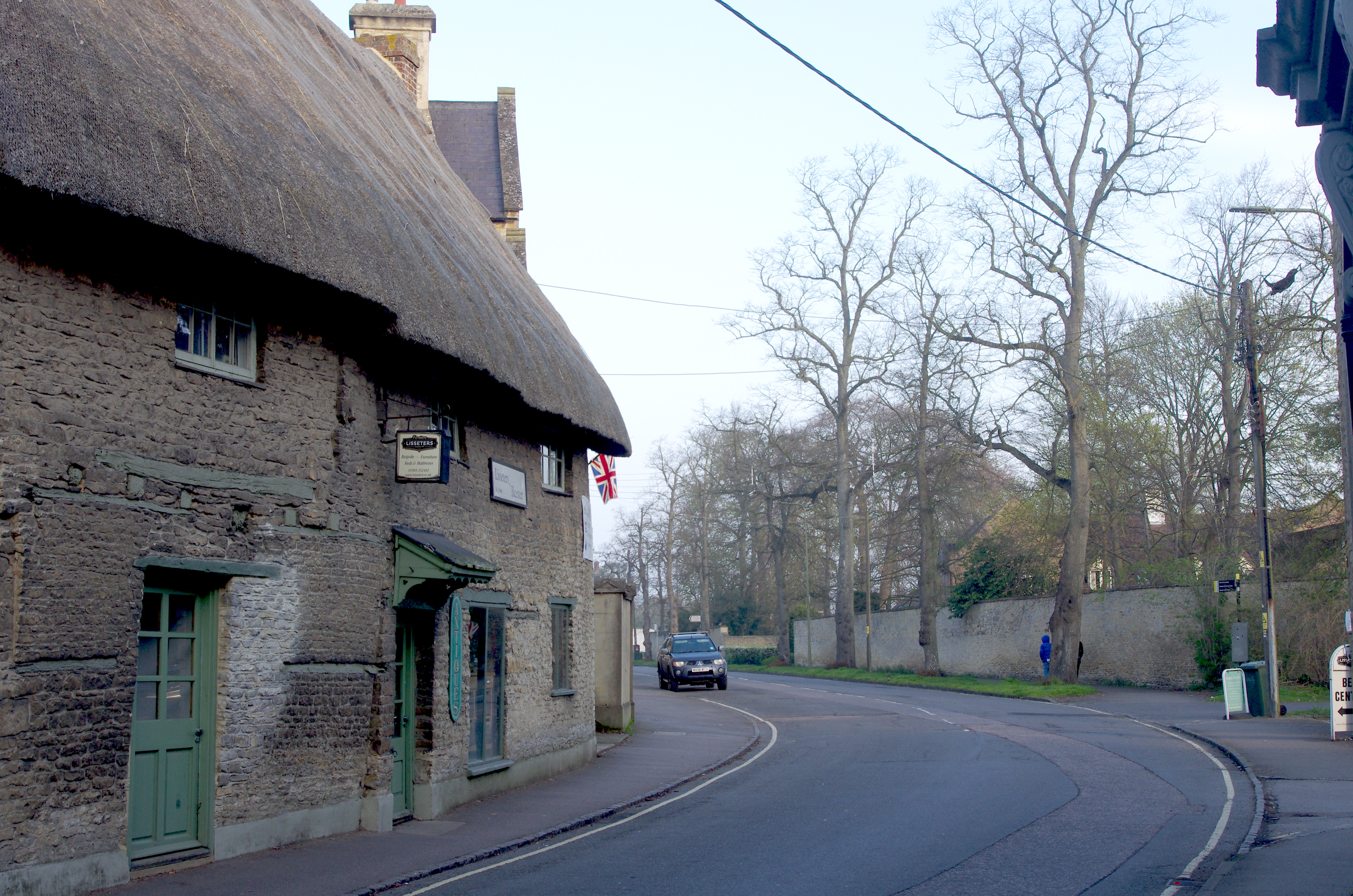
Thatched Building in King's End, Bicester

Local roofing materials included longstraw thatch, which persisted on older and lower status areas on houses and terraced cottages. Thatch had to be laid at pitches in excess of 50 degrees. This generated narrow and steep gables which also suited heavy limestone roofs made with Stonesfield slate or other roofing slabs from the Cotswolds. The other widespread roofing material was local red clay plain tiles. 19th century bulk transport innovations associated with canal and railway infrastructure allowed imports of blue slate from north Wales. These could be laid at much more shallow pitches on fashionable high status houses.

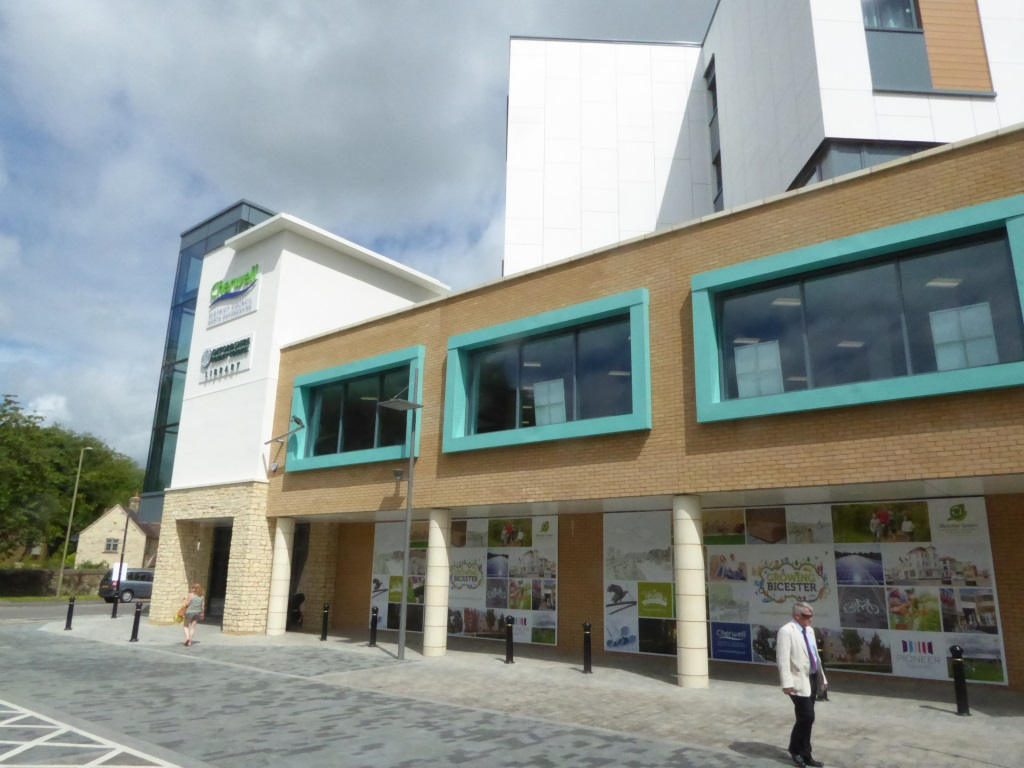
Bicester Library

Apart from imported slate, a striking characteristic of all of the new buildings of the early 19th century is the continued use of local vernacular materials, albeit in buildings of non-vernacular design. The new buildings were constructed alongside older wholly vernacular survivals and sometimes superficially updated with fashionable applied facades, fenestration or upper floors and roofs.

== Transport ==
=== Road ===
The town's nearest motorway is the M40 motorway, which is served by junction 9 to the south, an interchange with the A34 towards Oxford and the A41 for Bicester and Aylesbury. Bicester has a ring road which is made up of the A41, A4095, A4421, and the newly completed Vendee Drive which forms part of the B4030.

Its flat topography and compact sizing make it well-suited to walking and cycling. Coupled with an active cycle campaign, this attracted significant focus on further developing the active travel infrastructure as part of a £14 million central government grant to Oxfordshire County Council through the 'Active Travel Fund'.

=== Rail ===
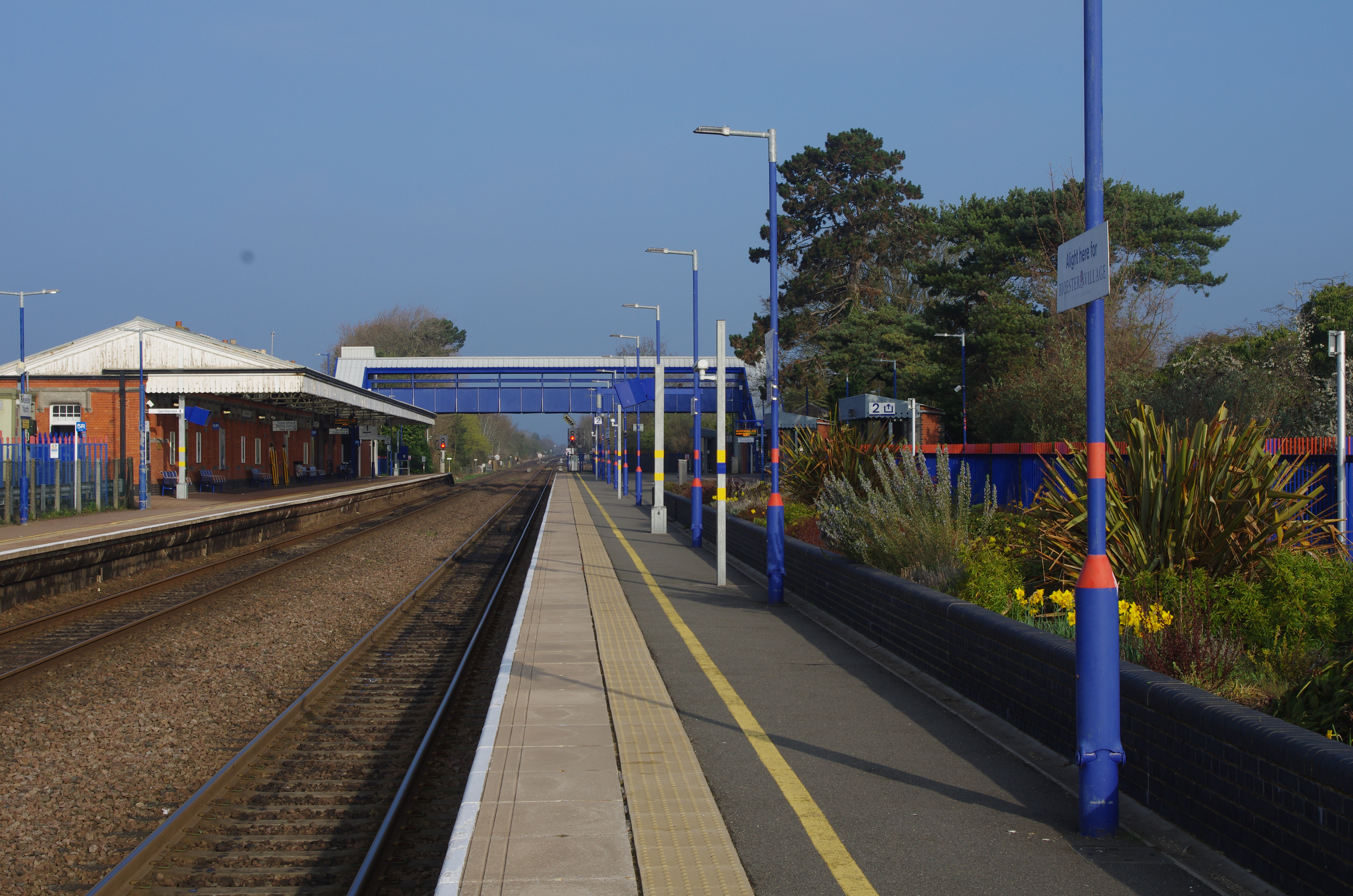
Bicester North Railway Station, opened 1905, on the Birmingham - London line

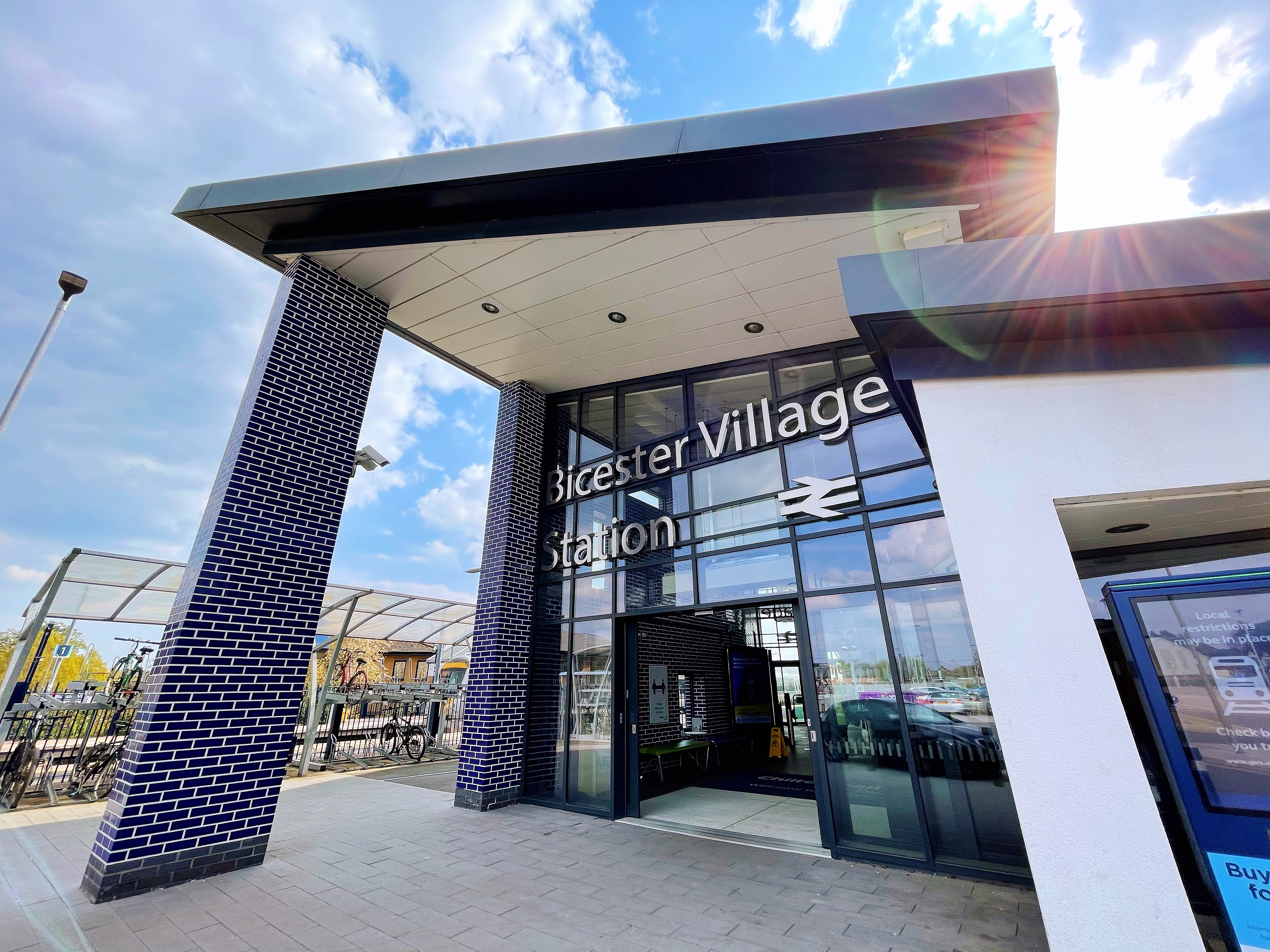
Bicester Village railway station, previously called Bicester Town railway station, re-opened on 26 October 2015 as part of the Oxford - Bicester - London Marylebone line.

Bicester benefited from the Railway Mania of the 1840s. The Buckinghamshire Railway was fully opened between Bletchley and Oxford on 20 May 1851, running through the eastern side of Bicester, with "a neat station at the bottom of the London road" being opened on 1 October 1850 to serve the town. Bicester's first fatal railway accident occurred at this station on 6 September 1851. Six people were killed and 18 injured. The station was renamed Bicester London Road station in March 1954 and Bicester Town station in May 1987.

The Great Western Railway sought to shorten its mainline route from London Paddington to Birmingham Snow Hill and, in 1910, opened the Bicester cut-off line through the north of the town, to complete a new fast route between the two cities and a large railway station on Buckingham Road named Bicester North, which was opened on 1 July 1910. The final slip coach on the British Railways network was "slipped" at Bicester North on 10 September 1960.

The Bletchley - Oxford line was closed on 1 January 1968, but partly reopened on 11 May 1987, when a shuttle service was instituted between Bicester Town and Oxford. The line towards Bletchley remains closed. In 2011, funding for East West Rail was approved, with a plan to restore passenger services between Oxford and Bletchley via Bicester in 2017, then continuing to Milton Keynes Central or Bedford. A further proposal was to extend the route through Cambridge as far as Ipswich and Norwich, but that did not materialise. At the end of 2017, the Department for Transport announced further government funding and a private company to build and operate the line by 2025.

Bicester has also benefited from the Chiltern Evergreen 3 project, which created a new mainline allowing trains to run from London Marylebone to Oxford via Bicester. The station was completely rebuilt and, despite objection by some local residents, renamed Bicester Village, after the large retail centre nearby. The station opened in October 2015.

The London to Birmingham line was run down in the 1970s. With the threat of partial closure, stretches of the line singled and trains rerouted into London, Marylebone. Following privatisation, Chiltern Railways was awarded the franchise. It reinstated the double track and considerably boosted the number of services, resulting in a substantial increase in patronage.

=== Bus ===
Stagecoach East route X5 links Bicester with Bedford, Milton Keynes and Oxford. Stagecoach in Oxfordshire buses link Bicester with Oxford, Banbury, Brackley, Headington, HM Prison Bullingdon and some local villages. Grayline and Diamond South East (previously Hallmark Connections) provide some local bus services, and Langston & Tasker runs a limited service between Bicester and Buckingham. In late 2022, Diamond announced that service 250 which connected Bicester with Oxford via a number of villages would cease operating on Saturday 11 February 2023. A partial replacement will be provided by new Grayline service 24 from Monday 13 February 2023.

=== Air ===
Bicester is within an hour's drive of three major airports and 8 miles (13 km) from Oxford Airport. Luton Airport is the nearest major airport, 43 miles (69 km) by road, taking around 1 hour 5 minutes. Due to the town's location beside the M40 motorway, it is a slightly shorter journey time of 51 minutes to Heathrow Airport which is 54 miles (87 km) away and 54 minutes to Birmingham Airport which is 52 miles (84 km) away. Bicester Airfield, available for private flights, is located adjacent to the town of Bicester to the north.

== Governance ==
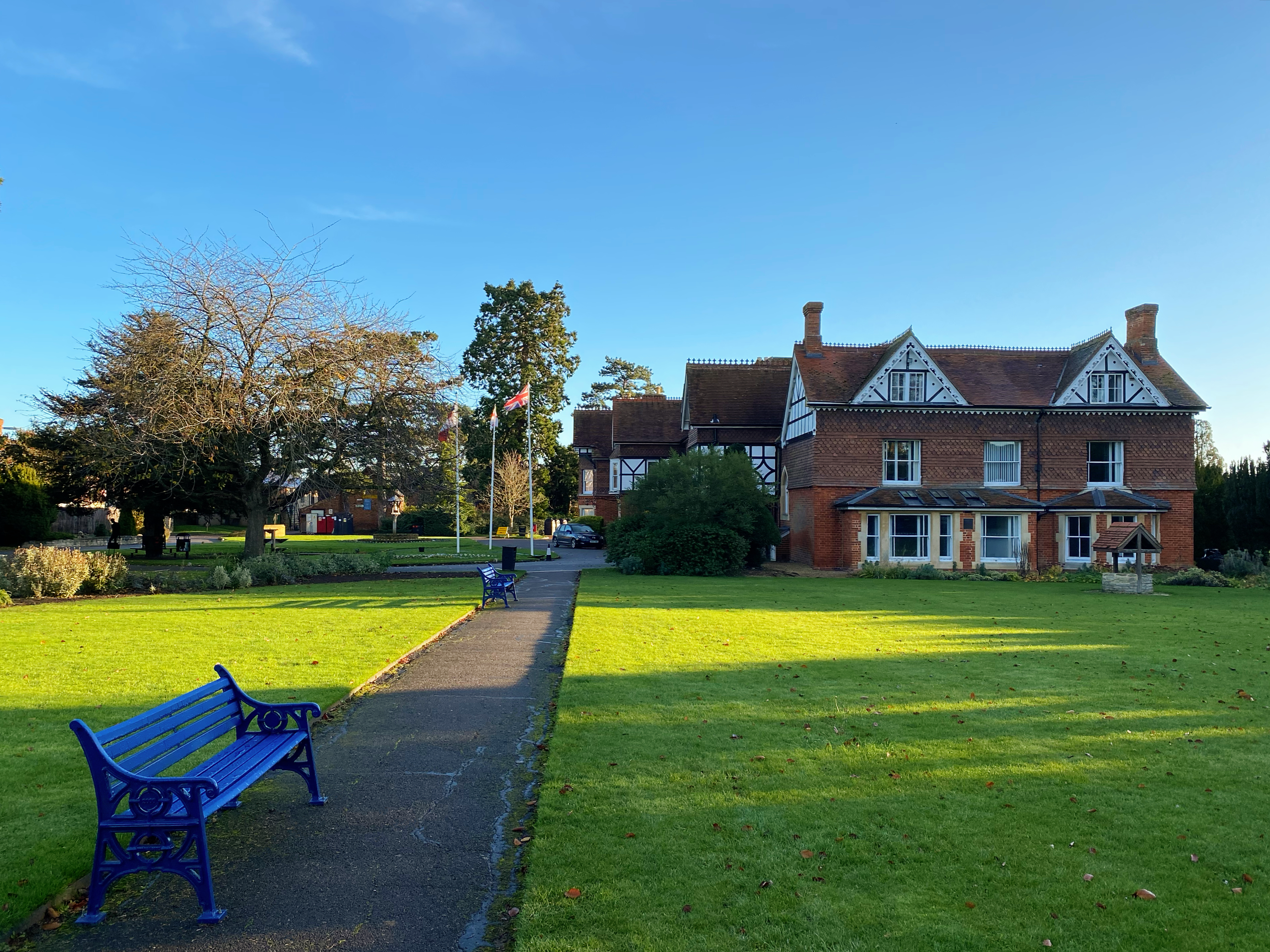
The Garth, a former hunting lodge, now offices of Bicester Town Council. The surrounding Garth Park is now a public park, playground, skate park, and café

There are three tiers of local government covering Bicester, at civil parish (town), district and county level: Bicester Town Council, Cherwell District Council and Oxfordshire County Council. The town council is based at The Garth on Launton Road.

=== Administrative history ===
Bicester was an ancient parish. It was subdivided into two townships, called King's End and Market End. Such townships became civil parishes in 1866. The parish historically also included Stratton Audley, which was a chapelry of Bicester until it was made a separate parish around 1455.

An attempt to establish a local government district covering the whole parish of Bicester was rejected at a public meeting in 1858. Instead, separate local government districts were established for King's End in 1859 and Market End in 1862, with each district having its own local board responsible for providing services including water supply, sewage treatment and street maintenance. The government merged the two districts into a single Bicester district in 1875. Such local government districts were reconstituted as urban districts under the Local Government Act 1894.

In 1946, Bicester Urban District Council bought The Garth, a large 1840s house, for £6,500. The main building was converted into the council's headquarters, and the grounds were opened to the public as Garth Park. Bicester Urban District was abolished in 1974 under the Local Government Act 1972. District-level functions passed to the new Cherwell District Council. A successor parish called Bicester covering the area of the abolished urban district was created as part of the 1974 reforms, with its parish council adopting the name Bicester Town Council.

== Schools ==
Bicester has three secondary schools: The Bicester School, the Cooper School, and Whitelands Academy. There are a number of primary schools including: Langford Village Primary; Glory Farm Primary School; Southwold; Brookside Primary School; St Edburg's; Five Acres; Longfields; St Mary's Primary School; King's Meadow, Bure Park Primary and Gaglebrook Primary School. The new Kingsmere development (south of Bicester) is due to create a two-form primary school.

== Media ==
Local news and television programmes are provided by BBC South and ITV Meridian. Television signals are received from the Oxford TV transmitter.

Bicester's local radio stations are BBC Radio Oxford on 95.2 FM, Heart South on 102.6 FM, Capital Mid-Counties on 107.6 FM, Greatest Hits Radio South on 106.4 FM, Hits Radio Oxfordshire on 107.9 FM, and community based radio station 3Bs Radio that broadcast to the town as well as Buckingham and Brackley.

The Bicester Advertiser is the town's weekly local newspaper.

== Sport and leisure ==
Bicester and North Oxford Cricket Club play at Akeman Street, Chesterton. It was formed in 1996 from a merger of Bicester Town, (founded in 1871) and the North Oxford Cricket Clubs which until 1929 shared the Oxford Road ground with the town's football club. As of the 2014 season, the senior teams play in the Cherwell League. Bicester Rugby Club was founded in 1947, originally playing on land provided by the King's Head pub. The club is presently based at the Akeman Street Ground. The senior teams play in the Berks/Bucks & Oxon Premier.

Bicester Town Football Club was founded in 1896 and until the 2010–11 season played in the Hellenic League. Bicester Colts F.C. organises teams from ages 5 through to 17 at facilities based at Akeman Street, Chesterton. Bicester Blue Fins Amateur Swimming Club was established in 1950 and has been based at Bicester Leisure Centre since 1971. Bicester Blue Fins is 'SWIM 21' accredited and affiliated to the Oxfordshire & North Buckinghamshire ASA and the ASA South East Region.

The Bicester Leisure Centre, which opened in 1970, comprises a swimming pool, fitness, gym facilities and all-weather pitches. Other popular sports and pastimes include tennis, which is played at the Bicester Tennis Club based at the Garth. It is affiliated to the Oxfordshire and Thames Valleys LTAs. Lawn bowls is organised by the Bicester Bowls Club which was founded in 1862 and since 1951 has been at the Garth. There are two 18-hole golf courses, at the Bicester Hotel and Bicester Country Club. The traditional game of Aunt Sally, widespread in Oxfordshire, is popular in the town and is organised under the auspices of the Bicester and District Aunt Sally League.

Bicester Town Council provides a wide range of sport and leisure facilities for local residents and sports team on sites at Pingle Field and Sunderland Drive.

Bicester is home to the McLaren Formula E Team, and the Technology Centre for the Sauber Formula 1 team (soon to be Audi F1 Team). Racing Bulls also operate a wind tunnel facility in Bicester, however they are in the process of moving to a new facility in Milton Keynes.

== Shopping ==
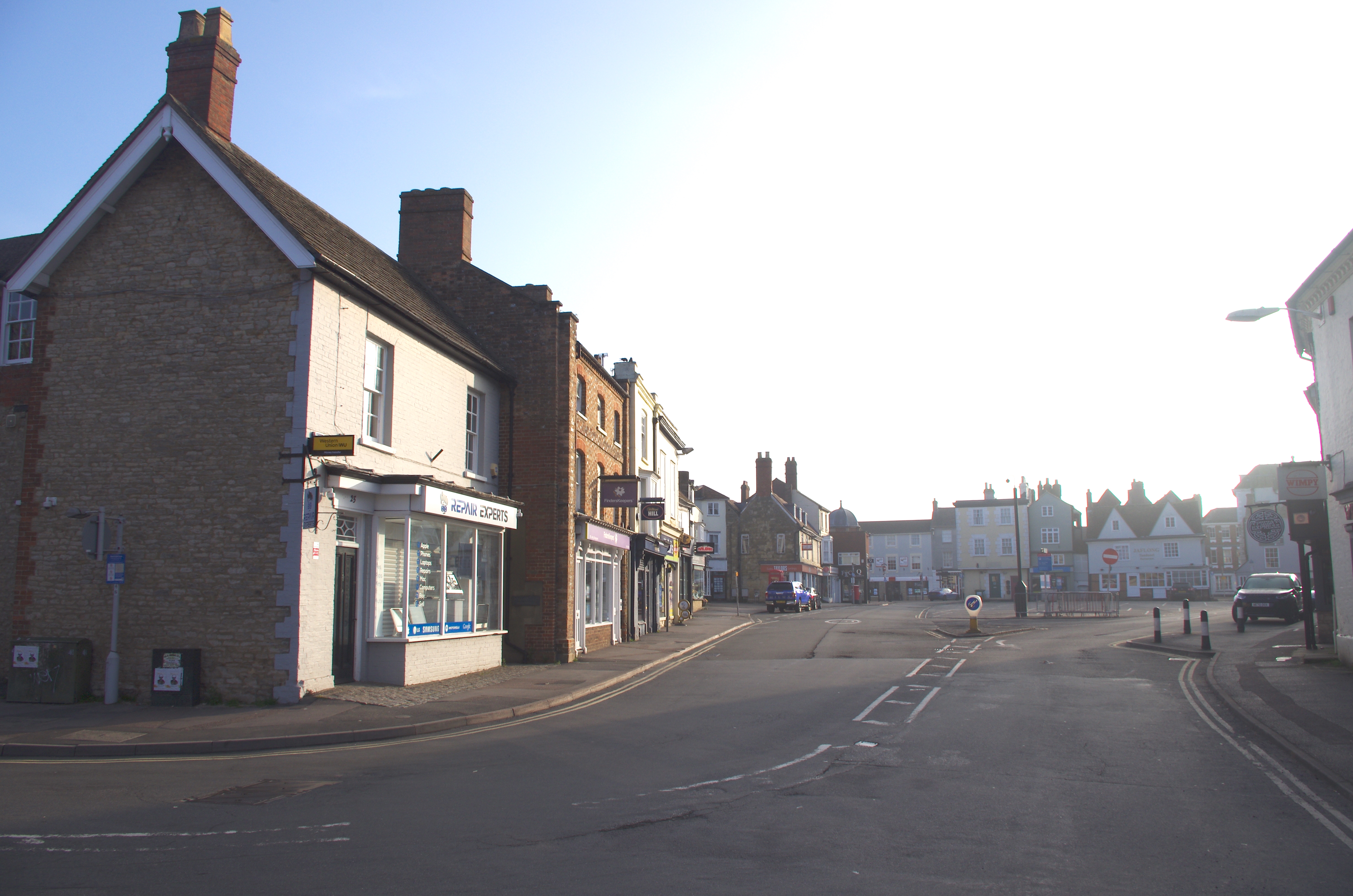
The Market Square, Bicester

The historic shopping streets, particularly Sheep Street and Market Square, have a range of independent and national shops together with cafés, pubs and restaurants. Sheep Street is now pedestrianised, with car parks nearby. There are weekly markets on Fridays in the town centre along with farmers' markets and an occasional French market.

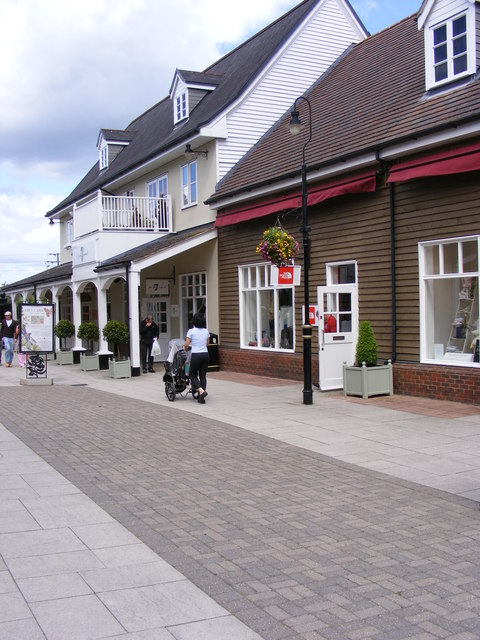
Part of Bicester Village

A £70 million redevelopment of the part of the town centre, originally planned to start in 2008, was delayed by the onset of the credit crunch; Sainsbury's developed the project itself, commencing in January 2009. The development, since named Pioneer Square, is now complete and opened on 9 July 2013, offering a Sainsbury's supermarket, 7 screen Vue Cinemas and many smaller retail units and restaurants such as Nando's and Prezzo. In early 2023, Cherwell District Council announced plans to pedestrianise the Market Square to create a continental style plaza.

South of Bicester, beyond Pingle Field, is discount brand outlet Bicester Village, and beyond that is Bicester Avenue Home & Garden Centre, one of the largest garden centres in the UK.

== Churches ==
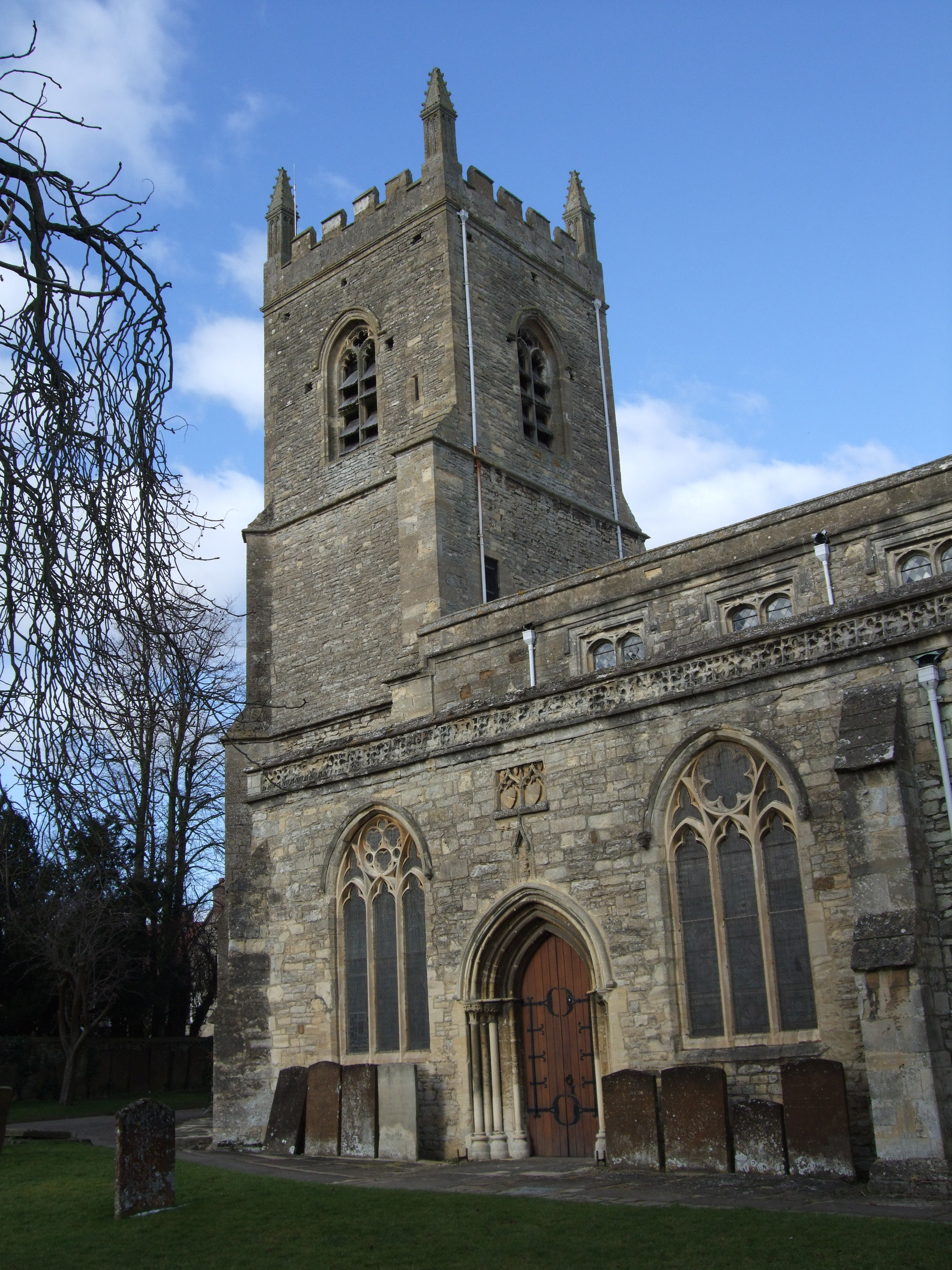
Tower of St Edburg's Parish Church

Most churches in Bicester belong to an informal local group Churches in Bicester. This enables them to work together and share responsibilities, for example the Bicester Food Bank and the Bicester Refugee Support Group.

Member churches include: Journey Communities (Pioneers in missional church); St Edburg's Parish Church (Church of England); Emmanuel Church (Church of England, which meets in a modern building at Barberry Place); Bicester Community Church (meeting in the Salvation Army Hall); Bicester Methodist Church; The Redeemed Christian Church of God, Impact Centre; The Church of the Immaculate Conception (Roman Catholic); Elim Lighthouse Church (Pentecostal – meeting in Bicester Methodist Church); Orchard Baptist Church (meeting in Cooper School); and the Salvation Army. Churches independent of Churches in Bicester are: Bicester Baptist Church (meeting in Southwold Community Centre); and Hebron Gospel Hall.

== Future developments ==
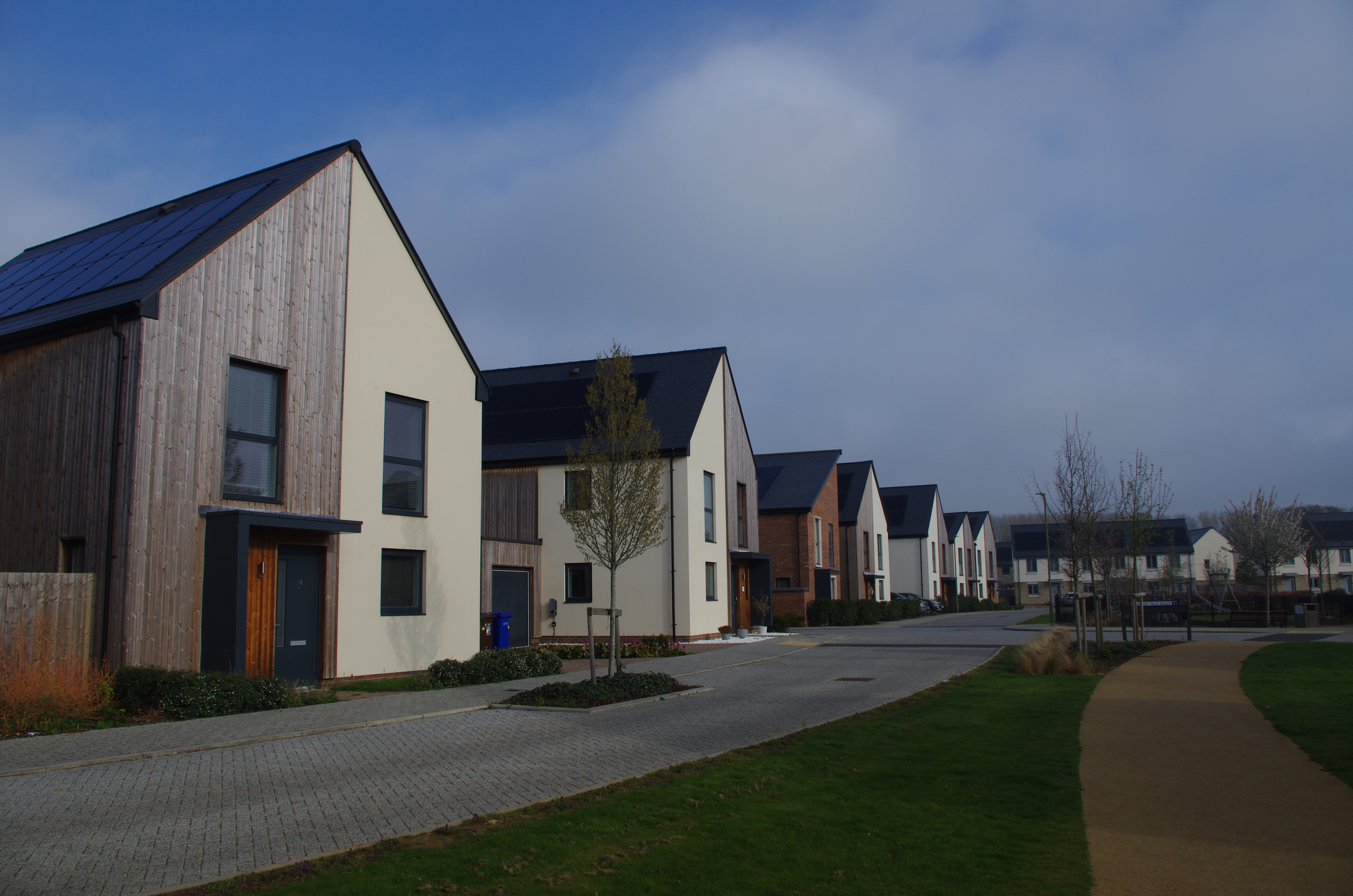
Elmsbrook Eco Town, Bicester

Bicester is in the midst of several construction projects the most recent of these completed is the new Tesco superstore which replaces the former site in Pingle Drive. The Pingle Drive site will be used to expand the Bicester village outlet centre by an additional quarter in size.

On 1 December 2014, it was announced that Bicester had been chosen as the site for the Coalition government's second new garden city. Up to 13,000 new homes could be built in the town, as part of plans to help deal with the UK's housing shortage. The former Bicester Town railway station was reopened as Bicester Village Station, to serve the expanded population as part of rail plans previously detailed by Deputy Prime Minister Nick Clegg. The station will also serve the planned East West Rail Project, connecting Oxford to Cambridge, via Milton Keynes and Bedford.

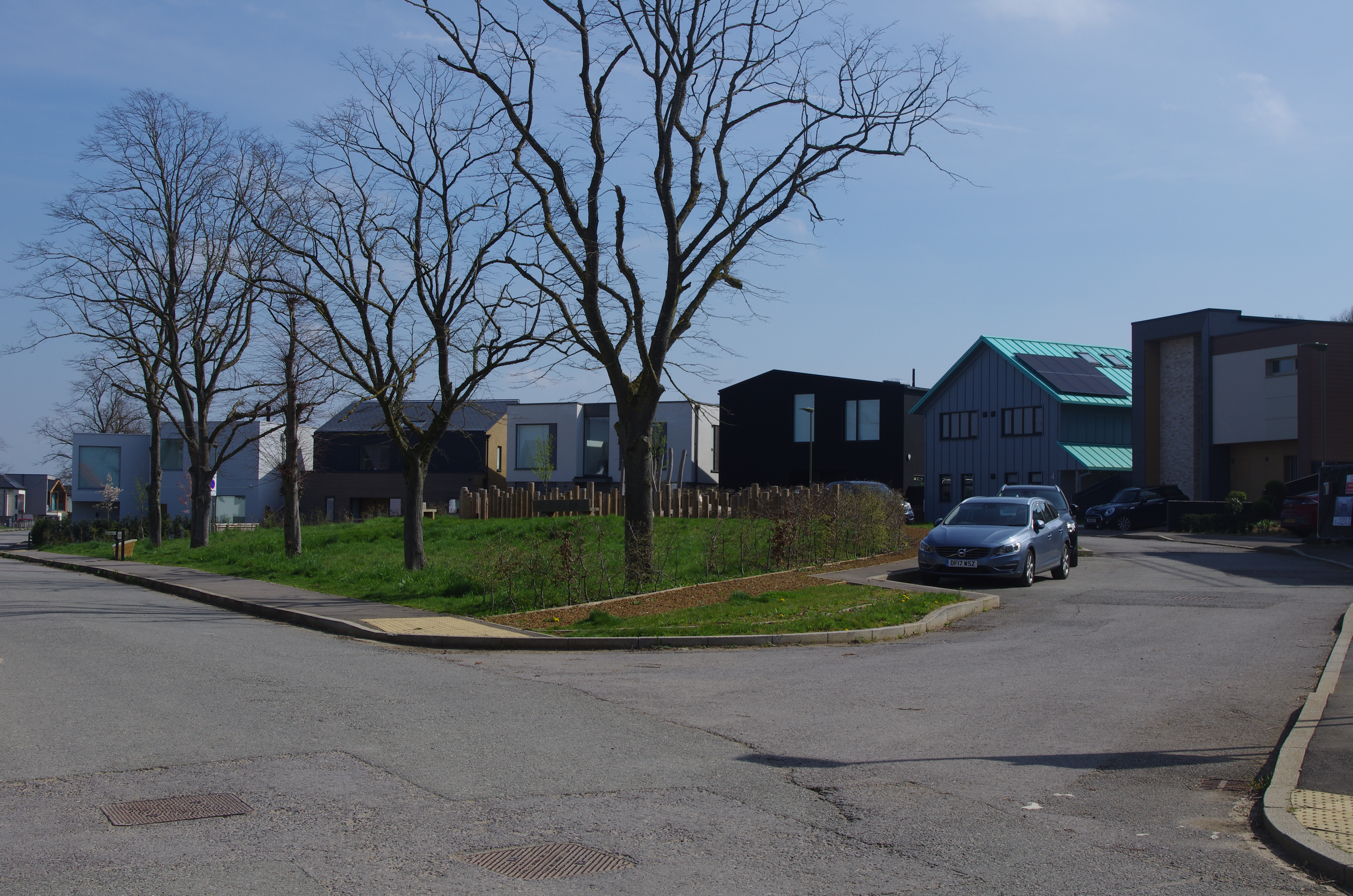
Self-Build Homes, at Graven Hill, Bicester

In accordance with the award of garden town status, the 6,000 home Eco-Town development has been constructed at Elmsbrook, to the northwest of Bicester. These comprise homes constructed with high environmental standards and environmentally friendly technology such as photovoltaic electrical panels, rainwater harvesting, and district heating. The first residents moved into the Eco-Town development in May 2016.

Similarly, 1,585 homes (phase 1) and 709 homes (phase 2) have been built in the southwesterly development named Kingsmere. Cherwell District Council established a self-build neighbourhood at the former Ministry of Defence estate at Graven Hill, to the south of Bicester, delivered through a wholly owned subsidiary company, the Graven Hill Village Development Company. 1,900 homes were due to be built, the majority to be self-build homes with the intention of offering an alternative to the mass build volume units being constructed in the rest of the town. The first ten self-builders were featured on the Channel 4 television show Grand Designs: The Street. However, controversy has arisen through the company's recent decision to pivot to constructing mass build volume units itself, marketed as 'custom build', with residents complaining that the company is now delivering 'volume build, identikit, energy inefficient' units.

== Twin towns ==
Bicester is twinned with:

- Neunkirchen-Seelscheid, Germany
- Czernichów, Poland
- Essarts-en-Bocage, France

== Notable residents and natives ==
- Brian Blessed OBE, actor, completed his national service in the RAF Regiment, Bicester
- Chloe Burrows, Television personality, born in Bicester
- Jenson Button, racing driver; Formula One World Champion 2009
- Ian Cognito (21 November 1958 – 11 April 2019), comedian, died in Bicester while performing, aged 60.
- John Dunkin (1782–1846), topographer and local historian, who wrote The History and Antiquities of Bicester.
- Andy Gomarsall, played Rugby Union for Bicester Rugby Club until 1993, going on later to play for England.
- Alun Howkins, professor of history at Sussex University. Wrote and presented the BBC TV series Fruitful Earth. Attended Bicester Highfield Secondary Modern School.
- Freddie Jones, actor, The Elephant Man (1980), Young Sherlock Holmes (1985), Emmerdale (2005-2018), died at Bicester in 2019 aged 91.
- Albert Freeman Africanus King, (born at Ambrosden) doctor who took care of Abraham Lincoln when he was shot
- Sam Long, professional footballer for Oxford United.
- Ian Paice, percussionist, lived in Bicester from age 6 to 18, before becomming a drummer with rock group Deep Purple.
- Charlie Ross (BBC television antiques expert); Active performer of the Bicester Choral & Operatic Society.
- Kenneth Williams actor, Carry On films (1958-1978), evacuated to Bicester during The Blitz.

== Arms ==
Coat of arms of Bicester
Notes Granted to Bicester Urban District Council, 30 October 1959 Crest On a wreath of the colours in front of a fox's mask two stalks of wheat in saltire leaved Proper. Escutcheon Barry nebuly Or and Gules a hurt charged with a fleur de lys Gold. Motto Ut Tibi Sic Aliis (Unto Thyself So To Others)

== Sources and further reading ==
- Beesley, Alfred (1841). The History of Banbury. Vol. 16 OxLSC (Extra illustrated ed.).
- Blomfield, J.C. (1882). History of the present deanery of Bicester. Oxford: Parker and Co.
- Bond, C.J. (1980). "The Small Towns of Oxfordshire in the Nineteenth Century". In Rowley, T (ed.). The Oxford Region. pp. 55–79.
- Dannatt, G.H. (1961–1962). "Bicester in the Seventeenth and Eighteenth Centuries". Oxoniensia. XXVI–XXVII. Oxford: Oxfordshire Architectural and Historical Society: 244–311.
- Dunkin, John (1816). The History and Antiquities of Bicester; a market town in Oxfordshire.
- Dunkin, John (1823). History and Antiquities of the hundreds of Bullingdon and Ploughley.
- Kennett, White (1818) [circa 1718]. Parochial Antiquities Attempted in the History of Ambrosden, Burchester, and other adjacent parts in the counties of Oxford and Bucks. Vol. 1 (expanded ed.). Oxford: Clarendon Press. pp. xvii, 582.
- Kennett, White (1818) [circa 1718]. Parochial Antiquities Attempted in the History of Ambrosden, Burchester, and other adjacent parts in the counties of Oxford and Bucks. Vol. 2 (expanded ed.). Oxford: Clarendon Press. pp. 526, un-numbered indices of names and places, extensive glossary.
- Lawton, E.R.; Sackett, M.W. (1992). The Bicester Military Railway. Oxford Publishing Co. ISBN 0-86093-467-5.
- Lobel, Mary D., ed. (1959). Victoria County History: A History of the County of Oxford: Volume 6. pp. 14–56.
- Martin, Jon (2011). "Prehistoric, Romano-British and Anglo-Saxon Activity at Whitelands Farm, Bicester". Oxoniensia. LXXVI. Oxfordshire Architectural and Historical Society: 173–240. ISSN 0308-5562.
- Mitchell, V.; Smith, K. (2005). Oxford to Bletchley. Country Railway Routes. Middleton Press. ISBN 1-904474-57-8.
- Page, W.H., ed. (1907). A History of the County of Oxford. Victoria County History. Vol. 2: Ecclesiastical History, etc. Westminster: Archibald Constable & Co. pp. 93–95, 154.
- Parkinson, R. (2007). Continuity and Change in an Oxfordshire Market Town – Bicester 1801–1861. Oxford: unpublished dissertation, Kellogg College, Oxford.
- Quick, Michael (2019). Railway passenger stations in Great Britain: a chronology (PDF) (5th ed.). Railway and Canal Historical Society. Archived from the original (PDF) on 15 November 2019.
- Sherwood, Jennifer; Pevsner, Nikolaus (1974). Oxfordshire. The Buildings of England. Harmondsworth: Penguin Books. pp. 452–456. ISBN 0-14-071045-0.
- A Pictorial and Descriptive Guide to Oxford and District. London: Ward Lock & Co. 1928.
