= Dry Sandford =

Village in Oxfordshire, England

Coordinates: 51.697°N 1.333°W

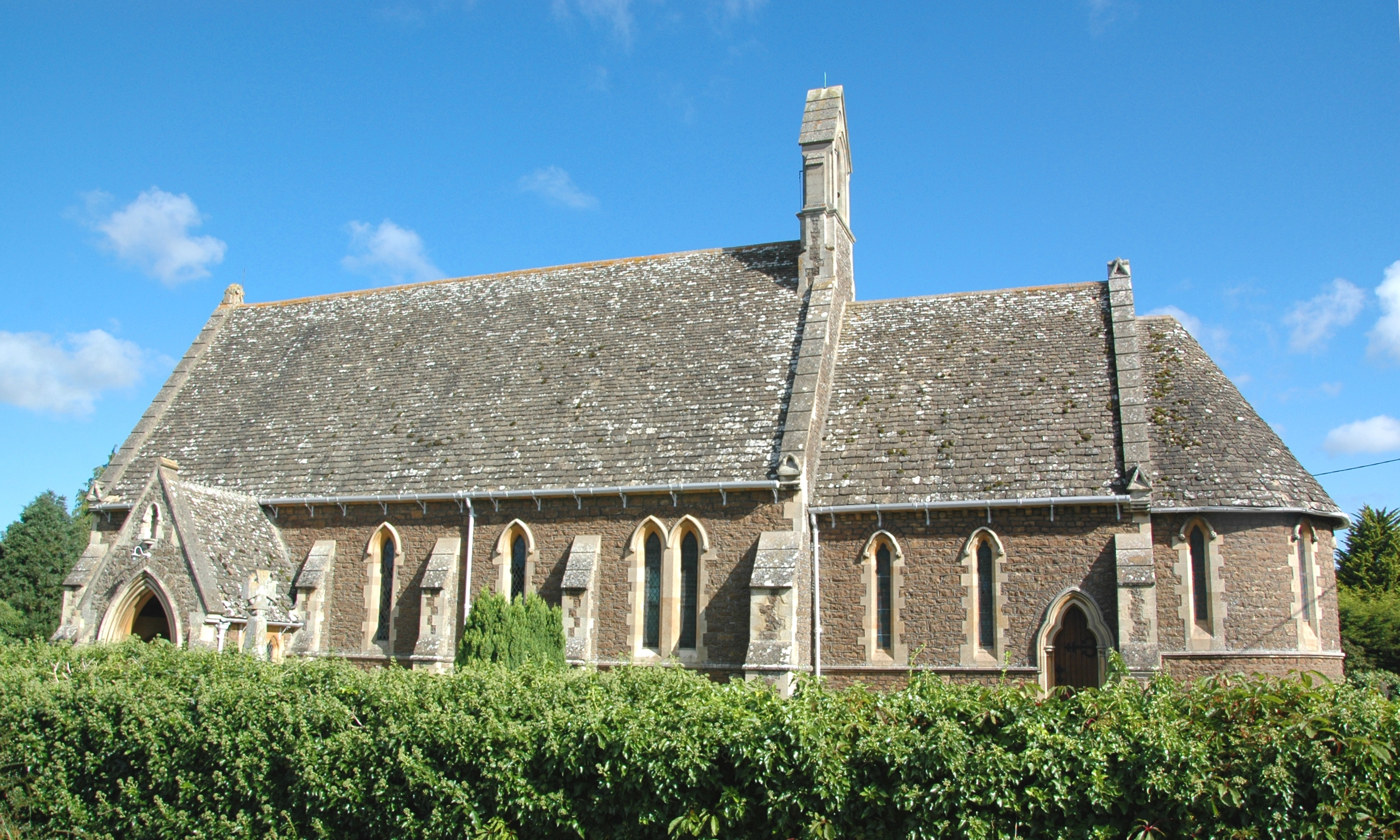
- St. Helen's parish church

- Location within Oxfordshire
- OS grid reference: SP4600
- Civil parish: St Helen Without
- District: Vale of White Horse
- Shire county: Oxfordshire
- Region: South East
- Country: England
- Sovereign state: United Kingdom
- Post town: Abingdon
- Postcode district: OX13
- Dialling code: 01865
- Police: Thames Valley
- Fire: Oxfordshire
- Ambulance: South Central
- UK Parliament: Oxford West and Abingdon
- Website: Wootton and Dry Sandford

Dry Sandford is a village in the Vale of White Horse district of England, about 3 miles (5 km) north-west of Abingdon. It is one of two villages in the civil parish of St Helen Without. It was part of Berkshire until the 1974 boundary changes transferred the Vale of White Horse to Oxfordshire.

== Manor ==
The Domesday Book of 1086 records the place as Sandford. The "sandy ford" must have been across the stream now known as Sandford Brook, a tributary of the River Ock, once known as the Lucringe. The village became known as Dry Sandford by the 18th century. Dry Sandford was a manor in the parish of St Helen's, Abingdon, and was held by Abingdon Abbey until the Dissolution in 1538.

== Parish church ==
The Church of England parish church of Saint Helen is a 13th-century-style Gothic Revival building designed by J.B. Clacy of Reading and built in 1855. St. Helen's has lancet windows, a nave, chancel, rib-vaulted apse and a bellcote on the gable above the chancel arch. St. Helen's was made a separate ecclesiastical parish in 1867, but was united in a single benefice with St. Peter's, Wootton in 2000.

== Amenities ==
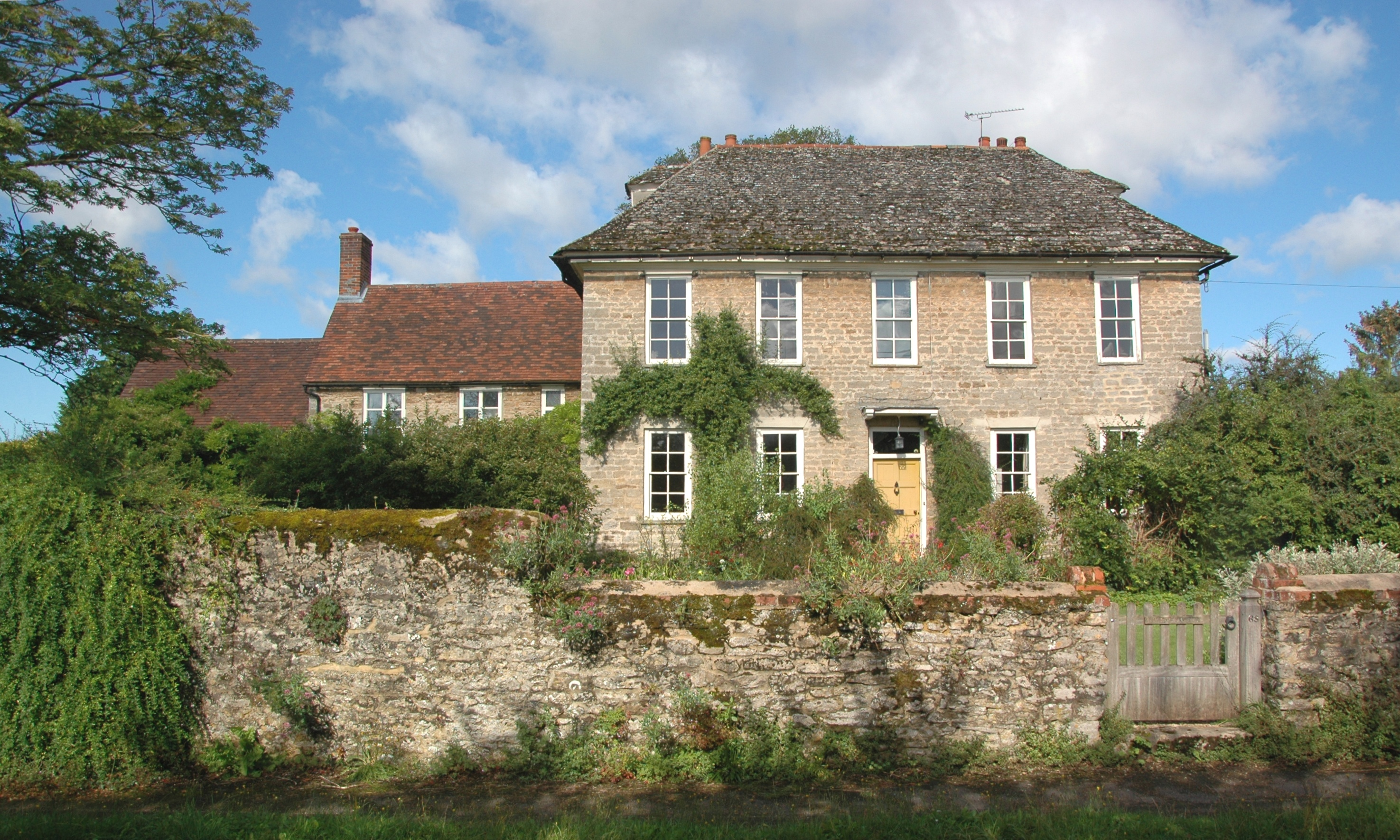
The east front of Church Farmhouse, added in 1718

Dry Sandford Pit is a nature reserve just south of the village managed by the Berks, Bucks and Oxon Wildlife Trust. The site is of geological importance for its exposure of Corallian beds, and is designated a Site of Special Scientific Interest.

== Sources ==
- Brodie, Antonia; Felstead, Alison; Franklin, Jonathan; Pinfield, Leslie; Oldfield, Jane, eds. (2001). Directory of British Architects 1834–1914, A–K. London & New York: Continuum. p. 375. ISBN 0-8264-5513-1.
- Page, W.H.; Ditchfield, P.H., eds. (1924). "St. Helen's". A History of the County of Berkshire, Volume 4. Victoria County History. London: Institute of Historical Research. pp. 416–421.
- Pevsner, Nikolaus (1966). Berkshire. The Buildings of England. Harmondsworth: Penguin Books. p. 130.
