= Abingdon bun throwing =

Throwing of buns

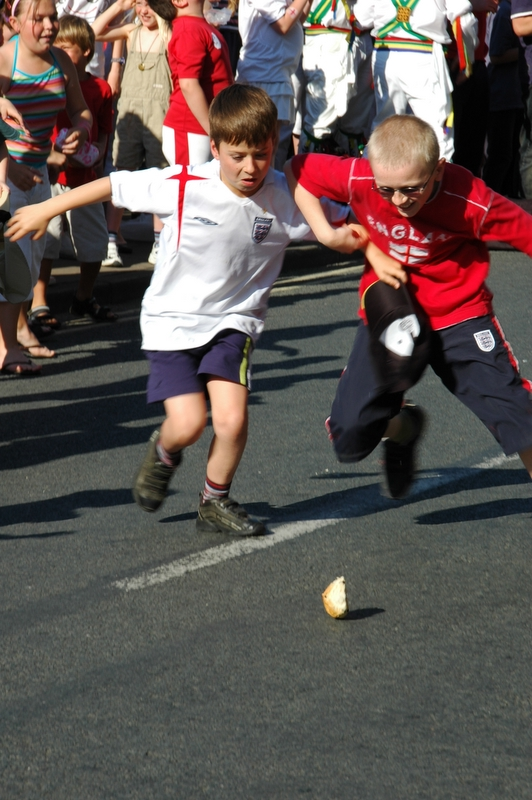
Two boys chase down a bun at the 2006 event.

A bun throwing is held in Abingdon-on-Thames, England, to mark special and royal occasions. During the event thousands of currant buns are thrown from the roof of the County Hall by members of the Abingdon Town Council. The council states that the event has a 400-year history, though the first known throwing took place in 1760 or 1761 to mark the accession or coronation of George III and Charlotte. The buns are sometimes marked with insignia related to the event being commemorated and are often kept as mementoes.

== Description ==
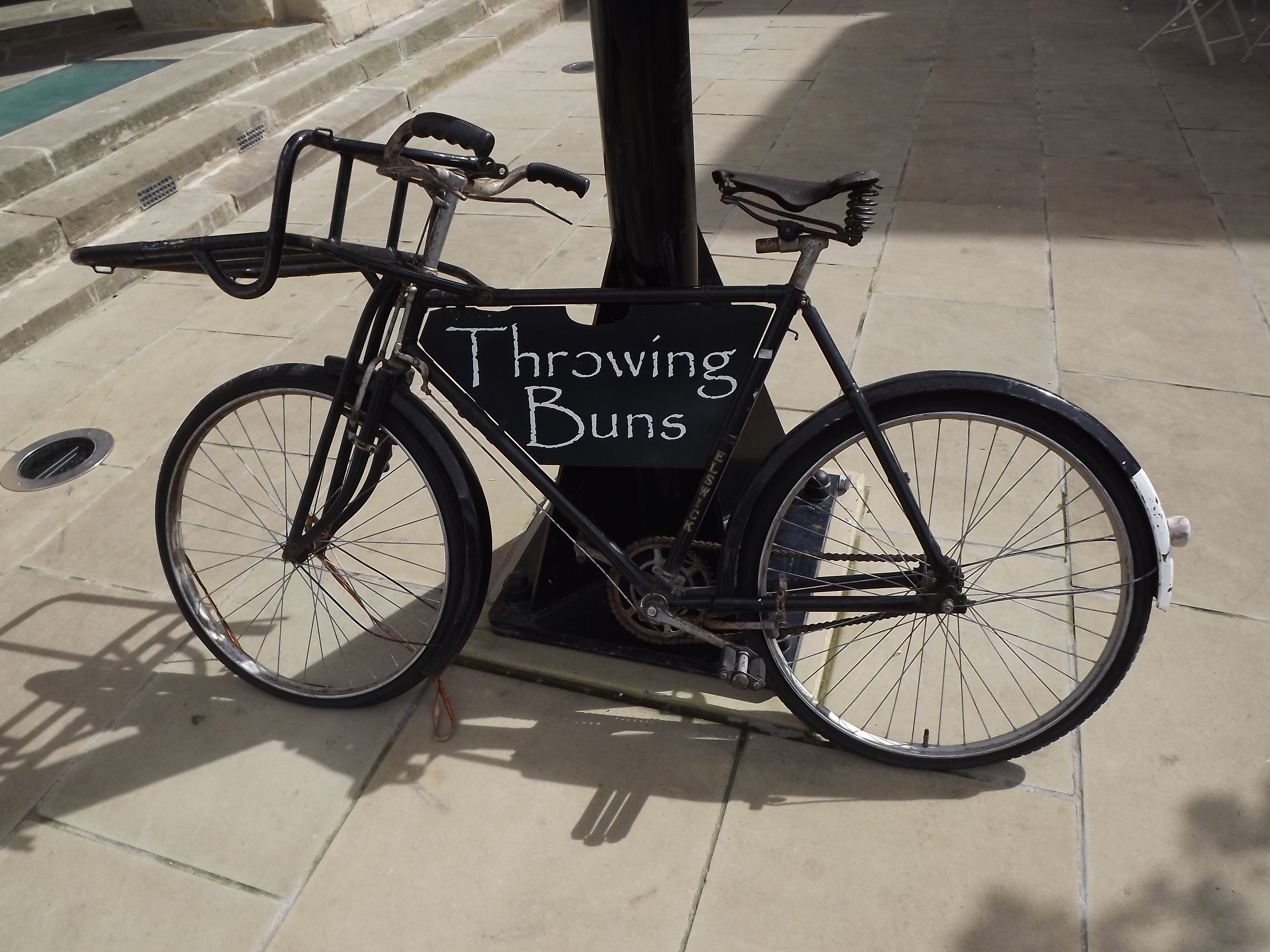
Sign for the café named after the event

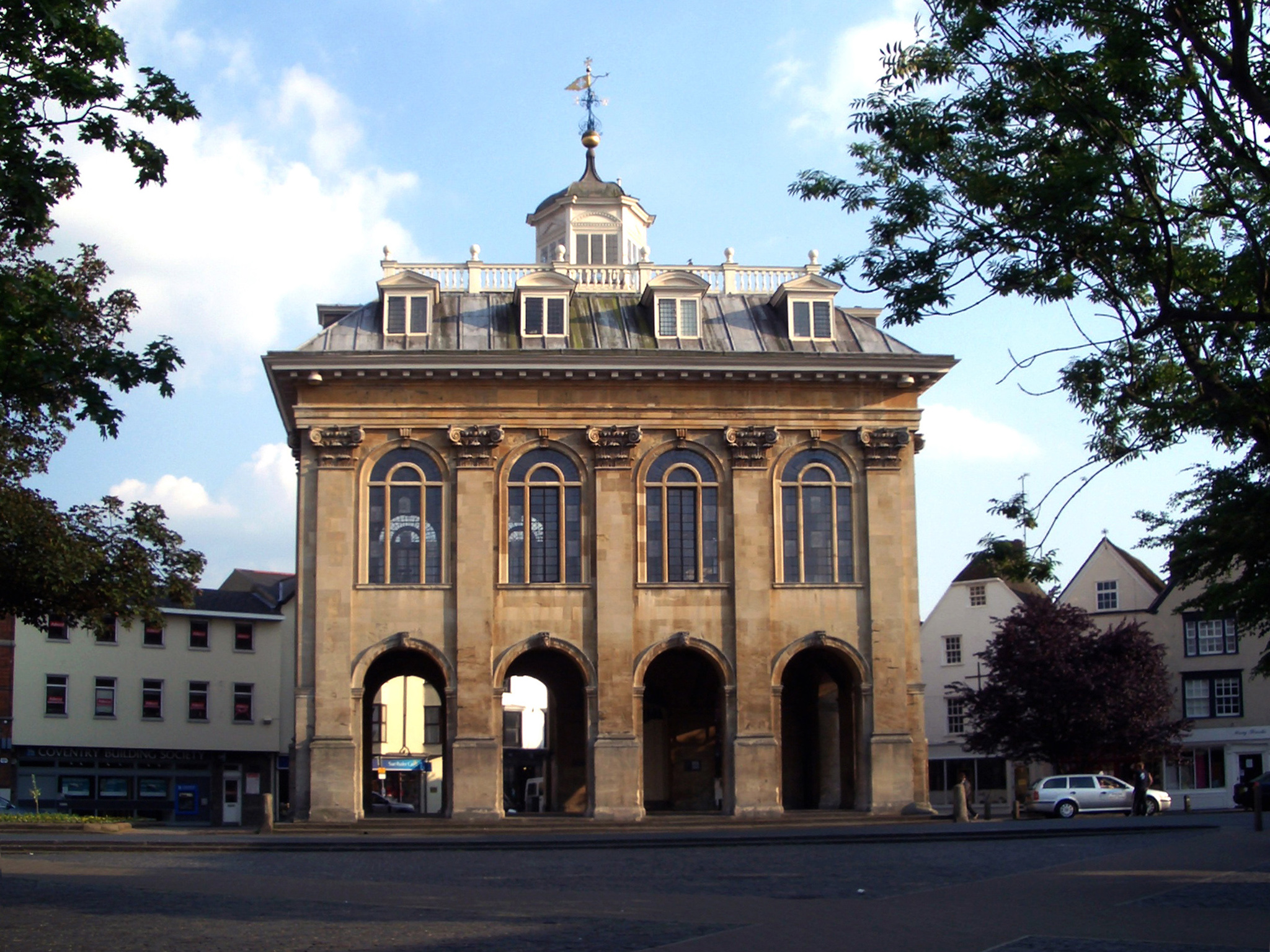
The County Hall from which the buns are thrown

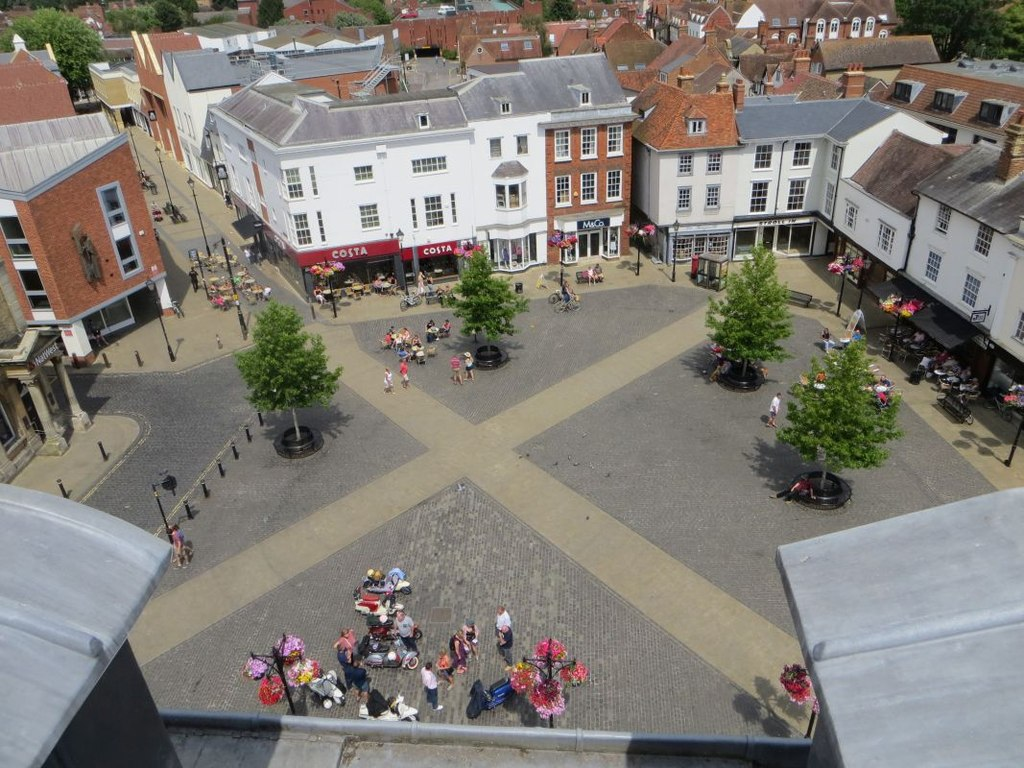
A bun-thrower's view from the roof

The Abingdon Town Council (the local parish council), states that the event has a 400-year history, though their own list of bun throwings begins with the Coronation of George III and Charlotte in 1761. The event is held to mark royal and special occasions and involves the town councillors donning ceremonial robes and regalia and throwing currant buns from the roof of the County Hall in the town's market place. Its origins are given by the town council as being "a gesture of loyalty and goodwill to the monarch" though it is also seen as "a way to reward the public on special occasions". The town council votes whether to hold a bun throwing for individual royal and special occasions.

In early years hundreds of buns were thrown but in modern events thousands are used; 6,000 were thrown in 2012 to mark the Diamond Jubilee of Elizabeth II (100 per year of her reign), 5,000 were thrown in 2018 to mark the 100th anniversary of the end of the First World War and 5,000 in 2022 for the Platinum Jubilee of Elizabeth II. The buns are all edible and currently made to a hot cross bun recipe, but without the distinctive cross design. Sometimes insignia are included specific to the event, for example 500 of the 5,000 buns thrown to mark the Platinum Jubilee of Elizabeth II in 2022 were marked with the number "70". In 2016 all 4,500 buns were marked with "90" for Elizabeth II's 90th birthday and in 2011 the buns were marked CW for the Wedding of Prince William and Catherine Middleton. In recent years the buns have been baked by local company Millets Farm, with a team of bakers starting work at 2 am on the day of the event. The quantity of buns is ten times the quantity of goods normally baked by the firm in a day.

The throwings are attended by thousands of residents who chant "WE WANT BUNS!" while waiting. In the past a musket shot marked the start of the throwing. Other items have been thrown, in 2022 six knitted buns, made by a Didcot-based yarn bomber were thrown. As well as being thrown buns have been launched by catapults and propelled by tennis racquets. For the 2012 event TV presenter James May developed a launching system on his series Man Lab. Those who catch the buns often preserve them as mementoes of the occasion. The use of umbrellas to catch large numbers of buns was banned in 2022. The Abingdon County Hall Museum holds a number of buns from past throwings in its collection. A local cafe is named after the tradition.

A BBC report from 2010 said that it is "thought the custom is unique to Abingdon", though Harwich in Essex holds an annual kitchel (bun) throwing on the third Thursday of each May to celebrate the town's mayor. A bun throwing on 7 May 2023, attended by a crowd in the thousands, marked the coronation of Charles III and Camilla on the previous day.

== List of bun throwings ==
- 1761 – Coronation of George III and Charlotte (though also might have been his accession in 1760)
- 1809 – Recovery of George III from illness (source claims this was the first event), though the buns are recorded as being "distributed" so might not have been thrown.
- 1810 – Golden Jubilee of George III
- 1821 – Coronation of George IV
- 1831 – Coronation of William IV and Adelaide
- 1837 – Coronation of Queen Victoria
- 1856 – Declaration of peace at the end of the Crimean War
- 1863 – Wedding of Prince Albert Edward and Princess Alexandra
- 1887 – Golden Jubilee of Queen Victoria
- 1897 – Diamond Jubilee of Queen Victoria
- 1902 – Coronation of Edward VII and Alexandra
- 1911 – Coronation of George V and Mary
- 1935 – Silver Jubilee of George V
- 1937 – Coronation of George VI and Elizabeth
- 1946 – First anniversary of Victory in Europe Day
- 1953 – Coronation of Elizabeth II
- 1956 – Visit of Elizabeth II to Abingdon
- 1966 – Abingdon International Week
- 1974 – Abolition of Abingdon Borough Council (the current town council is its successor)
- 1977 – Silver Jubilee of Elizabeth II
- 1980 – 80th birthday of Queen Elizabeth The Queen Mother
- 1981 – Wedding of Prince Charles and Lady Diana Spencer
- 1986 – Wedding of Prince Andrew and Sarah Ferguson
- 1987 – 40th wedding anniversary of Elizabeth II and Prince Philip, Duke of Edinburgh
- 1990 – 90th birthday of Queen Elizabeth The Queen Mother
- 1995 – 50th Anniversary of Victory in Europe Day
- 1997 – 50th Wedding Anniversary of Queen Elizabeth II
- 2000 – Millennium celebrations
- 2000 – 100th birthday of Queen Elizabeth The Queen Mother
- 2002 – Golden Jubilee of Elizabeth II
- 2006 – 450th Anniversary of the town's royal charter/Elizabeth II's birthday
- 2006 – 450th Anniversary of the town's royal charter/visit by Anne, Princess Royal
- 2011 – Wedding of Prince William and Catherine Middleton
- 2012 – Diamond Jubilee of Elizabeth II
- 2016 – 90th Birthday of Elizabeth II
- 2018 – 100th anniversary of the end of the First World War
- 2022 – Platinum Jubilee of Elizabeth II
- 2023 – Coronation of Charles III and Camilla

== See also ==
- Chelsea Bun House
- Horns of Ock Street
