= Larkmead =

Larkmead may refer to:

- Larkmead, West Virginia, United States
- Larkmead School in Abingdon, Oxfordshire, England
