= Abingdon Learning Trust =

Multi-academy trust based in Abingdon, Oxfordshire, England

ALT Trust
- Formerly: Rush Common Academy Trust (2012–2016); Abingdon Learning Trust (2016–2026)
- Type: Company limited by guarantee
- Founded: 1 February 2012; 14 years ago in Abingdon, Oxfordshire, England, UK
- Headquarters: Abingdon, Oxfordshire, England, UK
- Key people: Fiona Hammans (CEO); Jacqui Canton (Chair of Members); Jonathan Hopkins (Chair of Trustees)
- Members: 4 (2025)
- Number of employees: 316 (2024)
- Website: abingdonlearningtrust.org

ALT Trust (formerly Abingdon Learning Trust) is a multi-academy trust, exempt charity and company limited by guarantee, based in Abingdon-on-Thames, Oxfordshire, England. Four academies are part of the trust, two secondary schools: John Mason School and Fitzharrys School (including their shared sixth form, JMF6 Abingdon), and two primary schools: Rush Common School and St Michael's Church of England Primary School.

The Trust announced in July 2026 that it would be known as "ALT Trust" from September. This name change became official on 18 September 2026.

== History ==
=== Early formation ===
The Abingdon Learning Trust was formed in Abingdon-on-Thames, Oxfordshire on 1 February 2012 as the Rush Common Academy Trust. It was announced in 2016 that John Mason, Fitzharrys, and Rush Common School planned to join together as the ALT, and the company's name was officially changed on 9 August 2016.

=== Governance ===
As of March 2025, the Abingdon Learning Trust has four members and twelve trustees (including one associate trustee).

On 20 April 2020, Sarah Brinkley, who had been headteacher at John Mason School since 2015, became Executive Headteacher and Director of Secondary Education at the Trust. Brinkley left her role as Executive Headteacher in 2022, remaining the Director of Secondary Education until her resignation on 2 July 2023.

The Trust's Head of Governance is Jane Johnson. The Deputy Head of Governance is Debbie Brooks.

The Trust's CEO is Fiona Hammans. Zoe Bratt was named the CFO of the Trust on 1 March 2012. Bratt is also the Trust's COO. The chair of the Trust's members is Jacqui Canton.

=== Joining of St Michael's ===
On 18th September 2024, it was announced that St Michael's Church of England Primary School in Steventon, Oxfordshire is to join the Abingdon Learning Trust in December 2024. It had been previously announced that the school was looking to become an academy and join a multi-academy trust. They had a four-week consultation period for this, from 15 April–10 May 2024, where those affected were able to send their thoughts to the school. The school had an open meeting on 17th April, in which the Trust spoke about why they believed it beneficial for the school to join them.

St Michael's said they had also considered joining the Ridgeway Education Trust (RET) and the Vale Academy Trust, but had chosen the Abingdon Learning Trust due for a number of reasons, including already being part of the Abingdon Partnership, ALT aligning more closely to the school's values, and RET and Vale being large and currently not in a position to accept more schools. On 1 December 2024, St Michael's officially joined the Abingdon Learning Trust.

=== Name change ===
Abingdon Learning Trust announced in July 2026 that they would be known as "ALT Trust" from September. They cited the fact that "its work now extends across a wider geographical area" as the reason for the change. The name change was filed on 8 June, and was set to take place on either 1 September, or when the Trust received written consent of the change from the Department for Education, whichever was later. The name was officially changed on 18 September 2026.
