= Shippon =

Village in Oxfordshire, England

Coordinates: 51.675°N 1.303°W

- Location within Oxfordshire
- OS grid reference: SU4898
- Civil parish: St Helen Without
- District: Vale of White Horse
- Shire county: Oxfordshire
- Region: South East
- Country: England
- Sovereign state: United Kingdom
- Post town: Abingdon
- Postcode district: OX13
- Dialling code: 01235
- Police: Thames Valley
- Fire: Oxfordshire
- Ambulance: South Central
- UK Parliament: Oxford West and Abingdon

Shippon is a village in Oxfordshire, England, 1 mile west of Abingdon. It is the largest village in the civil parish of St. Helen Without, in Vale of White Horse District. It was in Berkshire until it was transferred to Oxfordshire in 1974. The Dalton Barracks are located in the village. The name was recorded in the Domesday Book as Scipene, meaning "cattle-shed". It was a manor in the large parish of St Helen's, Abingdon, and was held by Abingdon Abbey until the Dissolution in 1538. It was then acquired by the Duchy of Cornwall, which still owns it. Shippon became a separate ecclesiastical parish in 1865. The parish church of St Mary Magdalene was built in 1855 to a design of Gilbert Scott.
