= Osse Stream =

Stream in Oxfordshire

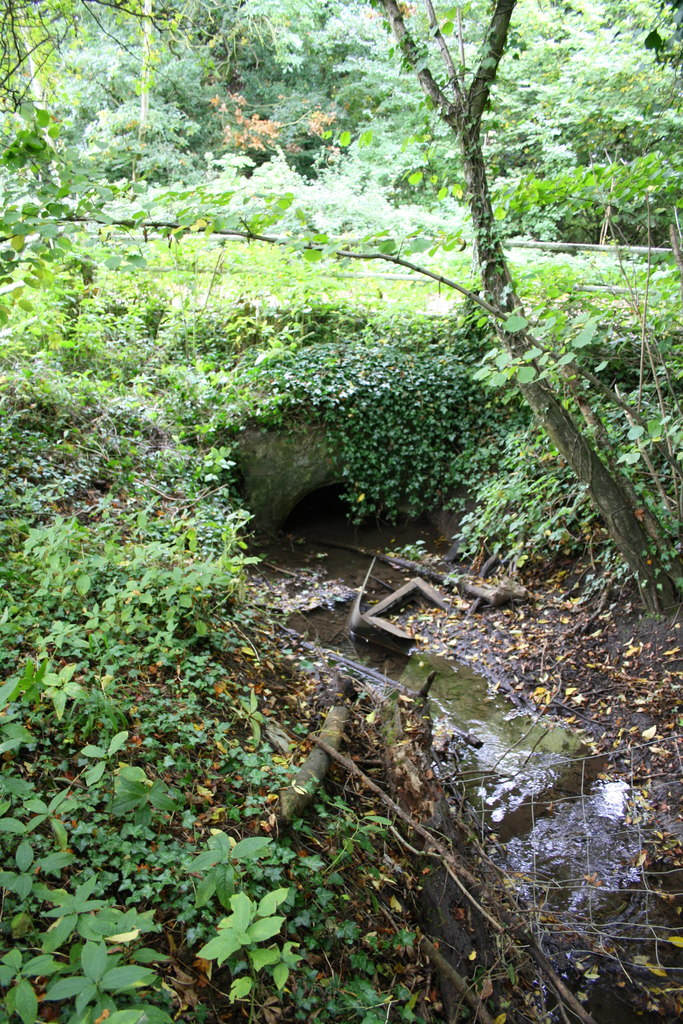
The Osse Stream near Besselsleigh

The Osse Stream or Osse Ditch, otherwise known as the Appleton Brook, is a small stream in the Vale of White Horse in Oxfordshire (historically in Berkshire).

The stream is a tributary of the River Ock, with its confluence near Marcham Mill. The stream rises at a pond in Cumnor, flowing past Besselsleigh, Appleton, Fyfield, Frilford and Marcham.

== Name ==
The hydronym Osse appears to be derived from the Old English word Wase, meaning 'mud'.

== See also ==
- Tributaries of the River Ock
- List of rivers of England
