= Abingdon Preparatory School =

Independent school in Oxfordshire, England

Location
- Kingston Road; Frilford, Oxfordshire, OX13 5NX; England; 51°40′18″N 1°21′54″W

Information
- Type: Preparatory School
- Religious affiliations: Christian, Church of England
- Established: 1956
- Founder: Evelyn Farrell
- Headmaster: Craig Williams
- Staff: 41
- Gender: Mixed
- Age: 4 to 13
- Enrolment: c. 250
- Houses: 4
- Colour: Navy blue/turquoise
- Website: https://www.abingdon.org.uk/prep/

Abingdon Preparatory School (known as Josca's until 2007, and informally known as Abingdon Prep) is an independent preparatory school in the rural setting of Frilford, near Abingdon, Oxfordshire, England. It is part of the Abingdon Foundation – a collective name for it and Abingdon School following a merger.

It is a preparatory school receiving the highest rating of 'Excellent' in inspections undertaken by the Independent Schools Inspectorate (ISI) branch of the Independent Schools Council.

== History ==
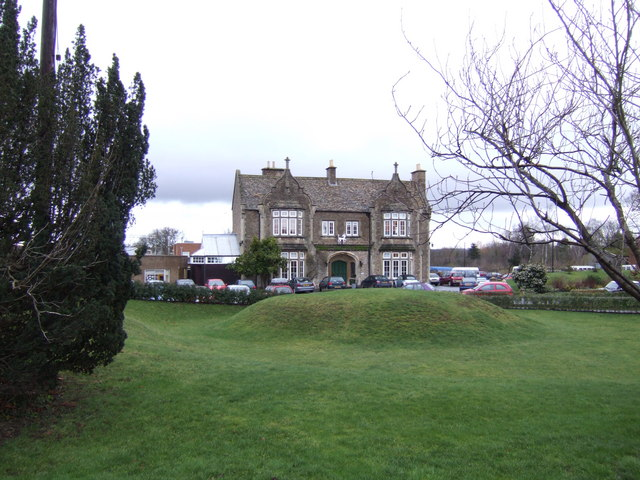
Abingdon Preparatory School main building

The school was founded by Evelyn Farrell in 1956 with 5 pupils; it now has around 250 pupils. From 1963 to 1999 the school was run by Tony and Gillian Savin.

In 1998, it merged with Abingdon School, with both schools becoming part of the Abingdon Foundation. In 2007, development costing £3 million – bringing a new sports hall, changing rooms, class rooms, and an art room – was completed. The school has a large sports field – especially large considering the size of the school. The area is known as Cox's Field West and Cox's Field East following a donation from Richard Cox, an Old Abingdonian. In recent years, a bridge over the busy A415 road has been built connecting the school on one side of the road to its sports fields on the other.

Craig Williams, took up the position of Headmaster in September 2017. In 2020, the school constructed a new building housing a science laboratory, music school, design and technology area and classrooms.

In 2024, the school announced that it would admit girls for the first time, consisting of Pre-prep from September 2024 and to Years 3 to 6 from September 2025.
