= Fitzharrys School =

Location
- Northcourt Road; Abingdon-on-Thames, Oxfordshire, OX14 1NP; England; 51.68171°N 1.28403°W

Information
- Type: Academy
- Local authority: Oxfordshire
- Department for Education URN: 146392 Tables
- Ofsted: Reports
- Head teacher: Will Speke
- Gender: Coeducational
- Age: 11 to 18
- Enrolment: 591 students (Years 7–11; 2025)
- Sixth form students: 88 students (2025)
- Colours: Blue, White and Gold
- Website: fitzharrys.oxon.sch.uk

Fitzharrys School is a coeducational secondary school and sixth form located in Abingdon-on-Thames, Oxfordshire, England. There are about 650 students attending. The headteacher since March 2020 is Will Speke, who took over from Jonathan Dennett. The school emblem that adorns the gateway and uniform badges depicts three harriers on a light blue background.

== School status ==
Until November 2018, it was a community school administered by Oxfordshire County Council. It joined John Mason School and Rush Common School to form the Abingdon Learning Trust (now called the ALT Trust) converting to an Academy.

Since 2005, Fitzharrys School has held the status of a specialist school for technology. The specialist school status is a joint partnership between the three state secondary schools in Abingdon: Fitzharrys, John Mason School and Larkmead School.

== Notable former pupils ==
- Kate Garraway (Good Morning Britain (ITV) presenter) attended the school.
- Professor Kathy Sykes, Collier Chair For Public Engagement in Science and Engineering at the University of Bristol, studied at Fitzharrys.
