= Helenstowe Nunnery =

Nunnery in Abingdon, England

Coordinates: 51.6676°N 1.2829°W

Helenstowe Nunnery was an Anglo-Saxon nunnery at Abingdon in the English county of Berkshire (now Oxfordshire).

Helenstowe is said to have been founded by a certain Lady Cilla in the 670s. It was probably the nuns' part of a double monastery along with her brother's abbey on Boar's Hill. It is believed to have stood on the site of St Helen's Church.
