= St Nicolas Church, Abingdon =

Coordinates: 51.670473°N 1.281133°W

St Nicolas's Church
- Parish Church of St Nicolas
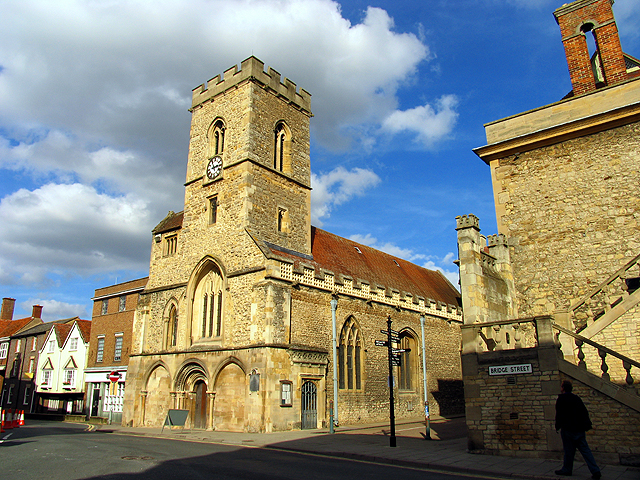
- St Nicolas's Church in Bridge Street
- St Nicolas's Church
- OS grid reference: SU 49843 97082
- Country: England
- Denomination: Church of England
- Website: St. Nicolas's Church, Abingdon

History
- Dedication: Saint Nicolas

Architecture
- Style: Norman, Decorated Gothic, Perpendicular Gothic

Administration
- Province: Canterbury
- Diocese: Oxford

The Church of Saint Nicolas is a Church of England parish church in Abingdon in the English county of Oxfordshire (formerly within Berkshire).

== History ==
The church was added to the gateway of the already-existing Benedictine Abbey of Saint Mary around the year 1170, although the oldest remaining piece is reportedly from 1180. While the monks used the abbey church, St Nicolas's was built for their lay servants and tenants. The Normans propagated the cult of Saint Nicholas and many English churches are named after him. The earliest documentary evidence of this church's existence is in a ruling about tithes in 1177 by Pope Alexander III. Saint Edmund of Abingdon revered there as a child and his mother was initially buried there. From its early years, there is evidence that a school used a room in St Nicolas which has links with the founding of Abingdon School. A tower was added and the chancel rebuilt in the 15th century.

== Parish ==
The church became a parish church in 1372, when the parish of St Nicholas was carved out of the parish of St Helen's. The new parish consisted of scattered pieces of land at Fitzharris, Northcourt and Bayworth, which were granges of the Abbey, as well as a mill on the River Ock and the precincts of the Abbey itself. The purpose of the new parish was to provide an income to the Abbey, after the devastation caused by the Black Death and the sacking of the Abbey in 1327. The two parishes were reunited in 1989 to form the single ecclesiastical parish of Abingdon.

For civil purposes the parish joined Abingdon St Helen's to form the civil parish of Abingdon in 1894.
