= John Mason School =

School in Abingdon-on-Thames, Oxfordshire, England

Location
- Wootton Road; Abingdon-on-Thames, Oxfordshire, OX14 1JB; England; 51.6764°N 1.2884°W

Information
- Former name: John Mason High School
- Type: Academy converter
- Established: c. September 1960
- Department for Education URN: 140580 Tables
- Ofsted: Reports
- Head teacher: Alastair West
- Staff: 123 (2017)
- Gender: Mixed
- Age: 11 to 18
- Enrolment: Yrs. 7–11: 859 students (2025)
- Capacity: 1040 students
- Sixth form students: 133 students (2024)
- Houses: Thames; Ock; Stert
- Colour
- Website: johnmason.oxon.sch.uk

John Mason School (JMS) is a secondary school with sixth form in the town of Abingdon-on-Thames, Oxfordshire. Named after English diplomat and spy Sir John Mason, the school opened in September 1960. It shares its sixth from, JMF6 Abingdon, with Fitzharrys School, another secondary school in Abingdon. As of November 2025, the school has an enrollment of 859 students in Years 7–11, and 133 students in its sixth form as of December 2024.

== History ==
John Mason School, located on Wootton Road, opened as a grammar school in September 1960, to 69 students. The school is named after sixteenth-century intellectual, diplomat and spy Sir John Mason. He was born in Abingdon and educated at the nearby Abingdon School. Coincidentally, the first Headteacher of John Mason School, Derrick Hurd, went on to become Head at Easthampstead Park School based on the estate of which Sir John Mason was the keeper in 1548.

The school was previously in a four-way partnership of Abingdon schools known as 14:19 Abingdon. The other members were Larkmead School, Fitzharrys School and Abingdon and Witney College. The four partners shared sixth form lessons. John Mason is now part of the Abingdon Learning Trust, together with Fitzharrys School, Rush Common School, and St Michael's Church of England Primary School, and shares its sixth form, JMF6 Abingdon, with Fitzharrys. In December 2024, John Mason had approximately 869 students in Years 7–11, and 133 students in its shared sixth form. As of November 2025, the school has 859 students in Years 7–11.

Sarah Brinkley, previously the deputy headteacher, became the school's new headteacher in September 2015. On 20 April 2020, she was succeeded as headteacher by Adrian Rees, and instead became the Executive Headteacher and Director of Secondary Education of the Abingdon Learning Trust. In 2022, Brinkley left her role as Executive Headteacher, and remained the Director of Secondary Education until she resigned on 2 July 2023. Rees' departure from the school was announced in February 2023, and he officially left the school in March, being replaced by Kirsty Rogers, who was the school's deputy head teacher and worked as acting headteacher until September, when, after eight years at the school, she left John Mason School to become headteacher at Aureus School in Didcot, and Alastair West became the new headteacher.

JMS is part of the OX14 Partnership, along with Fitzharrys School, Larkmead School, Radley College, Abingdon School, and St Helen and St Katharine. The partnership was officially launched on 19 November 2021, and allows the seven schools to coordinate opportunities, extra-curricular activities, and support with mental health.

Because of the discovery of reinforced autoclaved aerated concrete (RAAC) in the school's main block, John Mason School announced on 8 September 2023 that the school was to be fully closed to all students on Monday 11th, and that the school would have a reduced capacity for the rest of the week, with many students set to work from home. The United Kingdom government stated earlier in 2023 that areas where RAAC was identified should be evacuated and shut down until remedies could be put in place. The school had had multiple surveys for the material in 2022, and found no RAAC within any of the buildings. Despite this, the school stated on 8 September that it had been given "further information", and that there was indeed RAAC on the site. The reduced capacity restrictions continued for another week, though with more students on site. On Friday 22nd, it was announced that, after an additional survey from a surveyor commissioned by the Department for Education, the school was to reopen to all students from Monday 25th.

=== Specialist school and academy status ===
The school was granted specialist school status for visual and performing arts in 2004. In 2006, JMS built and opened the 06 Gallery using funding provided after receiving its specialist status. The 06 Gallery contains much of the students' artwork.

Previously run by the Oxfordshire County Council (OCC), on 1 February 2014, John Mason School became the first school in Abingdon to convert to an academy, giving it more control over its admissions, finances, and curriculum. While now directly funded by the Department for Education, JMS continues to work with the Oxfordshire County Council for certain aspects of education.

== Trust ==
John Mason School, along with Fitzharrys School, Rush Common School, and St Michael's Church of England Primary School, belongs to the multi-academy trust, the ALT Trust (formerly the Abingdon Learning Trust). Formed in 2012 as the Rush Common Academy Trust, it was in 2016 it was announced that the three schools planned to join as the ALT, and officially changed their name.

== Houses ==
The school has three houses, Stert, Ock, and Thames, of the colours red, green and blue respectively. There was a fourth house, Isis, but this was dissolved in 1993. The houses are named after watercourses in the town of Abingdon.

== Academic performance ==
According to the Department of Education 2011 breakdown of A-level results, John Mason were the sixth best in the UK for performance in mathematics, with 38% of students getting A* grade. In 2013, then-Education Secretary Michael Gove praised John Mason as "a school that, under a particularly inspirational head, is taking very very positive steps to provide students with a range of qualifications and the type of education that is relevant to the modern world."

In 2017, Ofsted reported its quality of teaching, learning and assessment, outcomes for pupils and overall effectiveness all required improvement; the second lowest grade. The school was inspected again in 2019, and was rated good in all categories, except its sixth form - which was rated outstanding, the highest grade. Ofsted returned in December 2024 and performed an ungraded inspection. They stated that "aspects of the school’s work may not be as strong as at the time of the previous inspection", and that they would return to the school and perform a graded inspection.

== The Welsh Farm ==
The school owns a farm, generally known as the Welsh Farm, at Troedyrhiwgellifawr near the village of Pumsaint and the town of Llandovery in Wales. Students commonly undertake a four-day trip. The John Mason Association owns and runs the farm.

== Notable former staff and pupils ==
Paul Mayhew-Archer (a writer on The Vicar of Dibley and My Hero) was formerly a teacher at JMS.

Famous former pupils include West End actor and singer Oliver Tompsett, BBC and Channel 5 news presenter Katie Ledger, and Dr Mike Leahy, who presents his own TV programme Invasion of the Bodyscratchers and has appeared in many other medical programmes.
