= St Helen's Church, Abingdon =

St Helen's Church
- Parish church of Abingdon-on-Thames
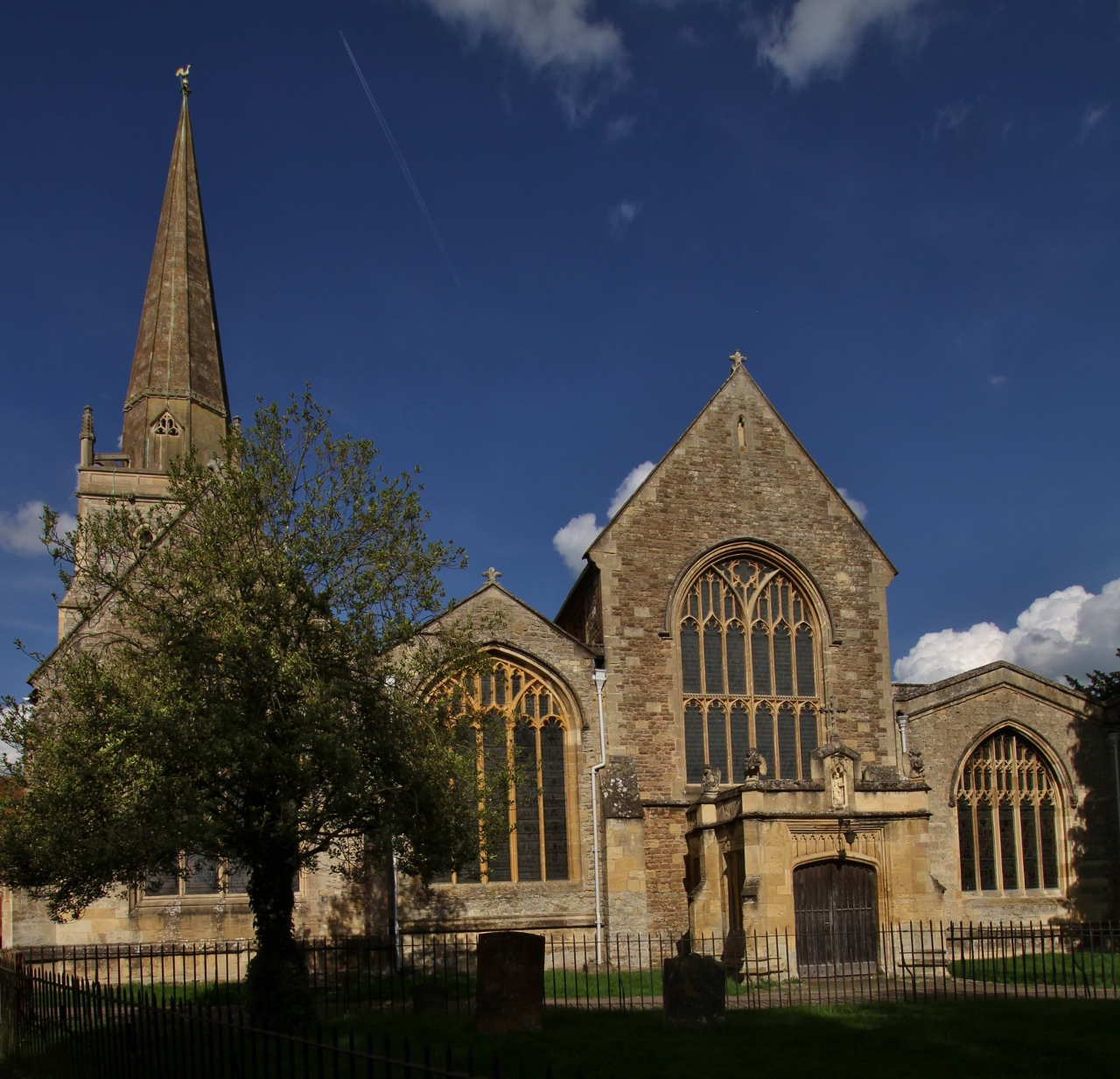
- spire (left) and west front
- St Helen's Church
- 51.6676°N 1.2829°W
- OS grid reference: SU 49694 96775
- Location: Abingdon, Oxfordshire
- Country: England
- Denomination: Church of England
- Website: St Helen's Church

History
- Status: church
- Dedication: Saint Helen

Architecture
- Functional status: active
- Heritage designation: Grade I listed
- Designated: 19 January 1951
- Style: English Gothic
- Years built: 13th–16th centuries

Specifications
- Materials: stone

Administration
- Province: Canterbury
- Diocese: Oxford
- Parish: Abingdon-on-Thames

Clergy
- Rector: Dr Charles Miller

Listed Building – Grade I
- Official name: Church of St Helen
- Designated: 19 January 1951
- Reference no.: 1210759

St Helen's Church is a Church of England parish church in Abingdon on the bank of the River Thames in Oxfordshire (formerly Berkshire), England. The church is thought to occupy the site of the Anglo-Saxon Helenstowe Nunnery.

== Building ==
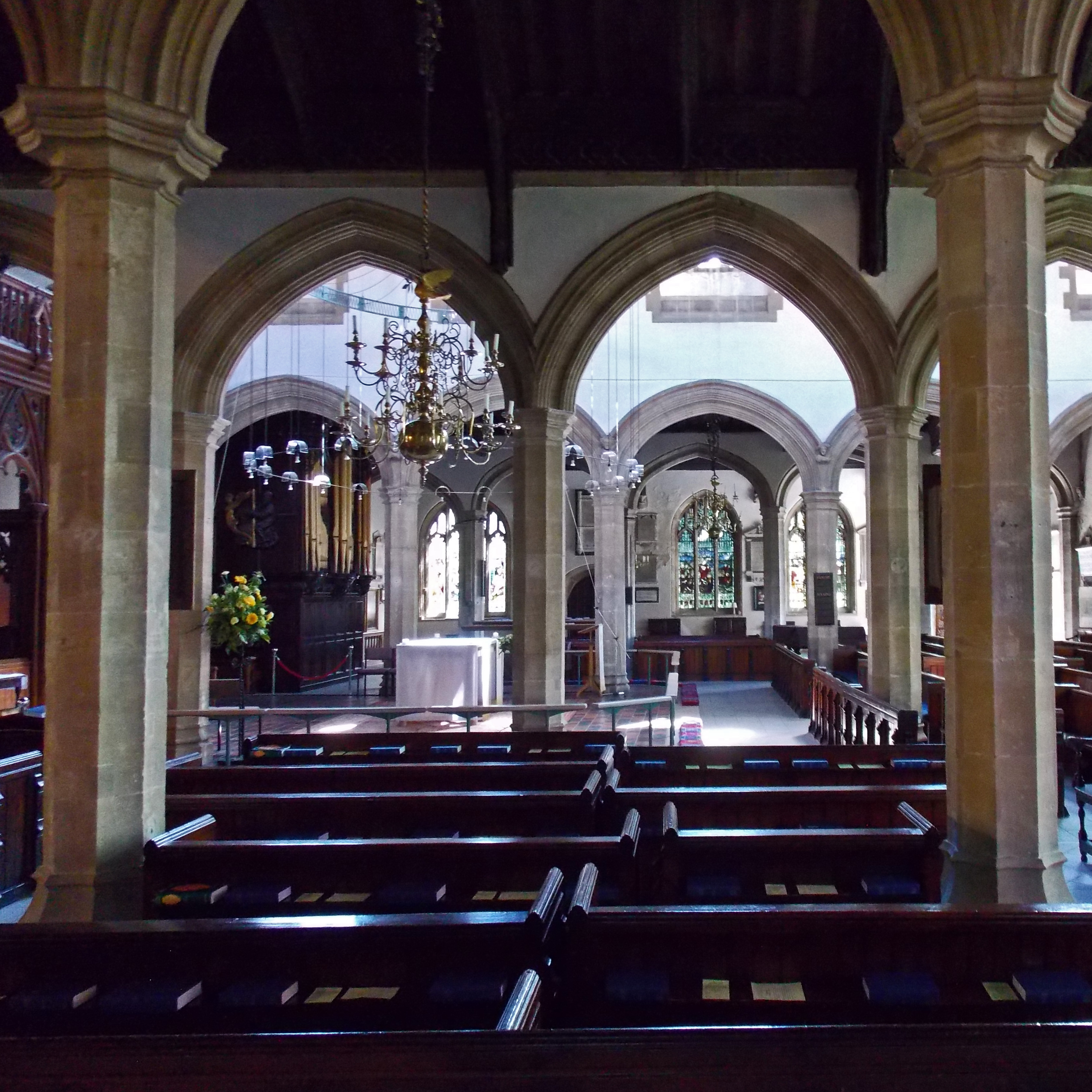
Inside St Helen's, looking south from the outer north aisle through all four arcades to the outer south aisle

The church spire is a landmark of the town. The earliest parts of the church are late 12th- or early 13th-century. Some of the windows are 14th-century and the building was remodelled in the 15th and 16th centuries. The building was restored in 1869–73 to plans by the Gothic Revival architect Henry Woodyer. Of note within the church are the painted ceiling panels of the north aisle, dating from about 1390 and representing the Tree of Jesse. The church is a Grade I listed building.

Around the churchyard are three sets of almshouses: Long Alley Almshouses built in 1446, Twitty's Almshouses of 1707 and Brick Alley Almshouses of 1718. The architectural historian Nikolaus Pevsner declared "No other churchyard anywhere has anything like it."

== Bells ==
The northeast tower has a ring of ten bells. The remains of a ring of eight cast by Lester and Pack of Whitechapel in 1764, several were later recast when the ring was augmented to ten and the 7th was recast in 1970. The Whitechapel Bell Foundry cast ten new bells in 2005, the old bells being found new homes elsewhere. The new bells were hung by local bellhangers Whites of Appleton. St Helen's has also a sanctus bell cast by Ellis I Knight of Reading, Berkshire in 1641. The church clock has a single bell cast by Henry Bond of Burford in 1902, this having formerly been the 8th bell of the ring of ten at Long Crendon, Bucks, and the former 8th of the Abingdon ring taking its place at Long Crendon.

== Parish ==
The parish of St Helen's was large, extending well beyond the town of Abingdon. It included the villages of Shippon, Dry Sandford, Radley, Kennington and Drayton, as well as Abingdon itself. In 1372 the parish of St Nicolas was carved out of the parish, so that Abingdon was divided between two ecclesiastical parishes until they were reunited in 1989. Radley (with Kennington) and Drayton, although nominally in the parish until the 19th century, were for practical purposes independent. Shippon and Dry Sandford became separate ecclesiastical parishes in 1865 and 1867 respectively.

When civil parishes were created in the 19th century, Radley and Drayton were made separate civil parishes. In 1894 St Helen's civil parish was divided. The part within Abingdon joined the civil parish of St Nicholas to form the civil parish of Abingdon, and the rest of the parish became the civil parish of St Helen Without.

== J. M. W. Turner ==
The spire of St Helen's appears in a painting of around 1806 by J. M. W. Turner (1775–1851) called Abingdon, although the main scene depicted is believed to be a view of Dorchester on Thames, several miles away.

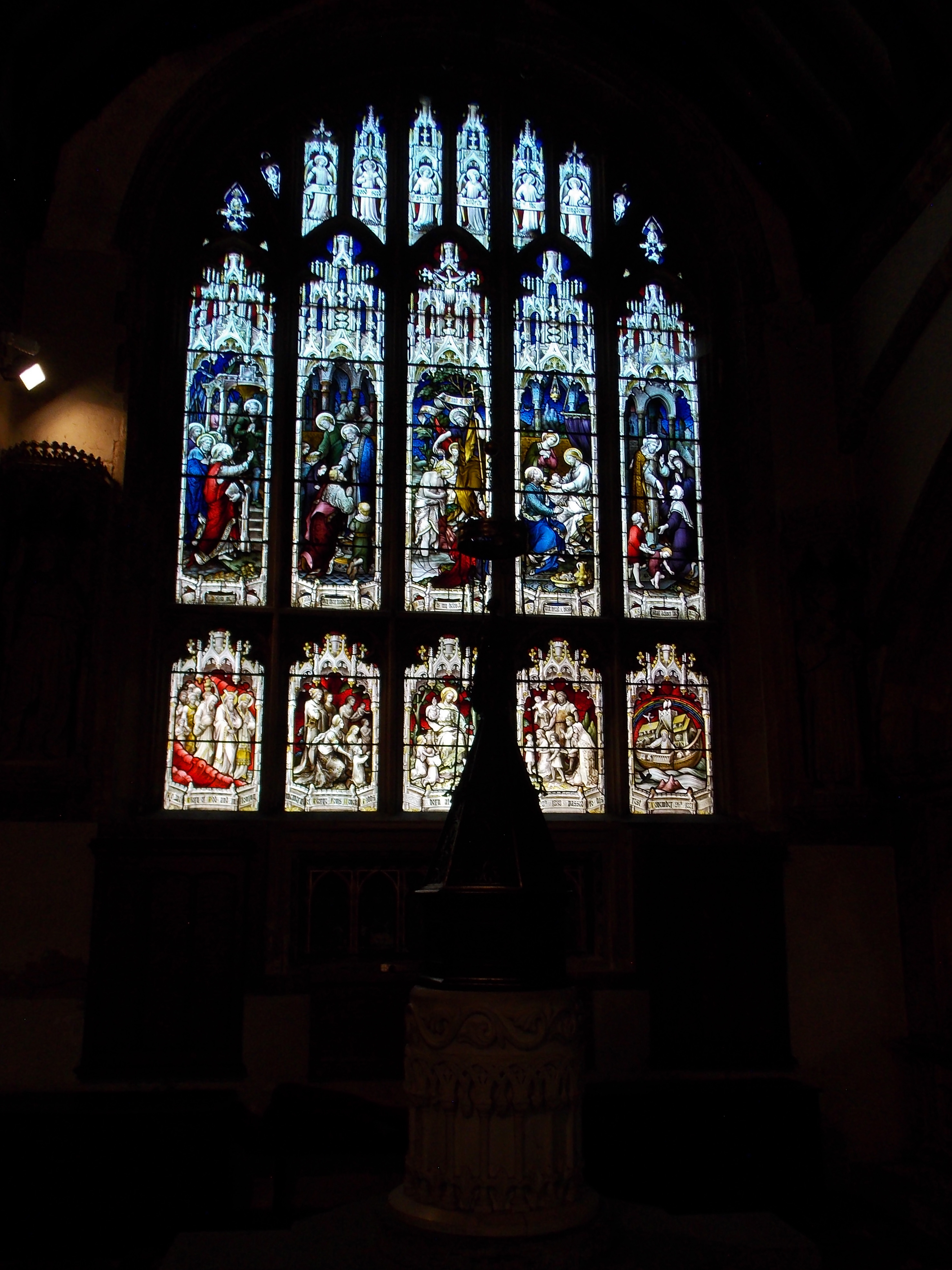
A stained glass window behind the baptismal font

== William Lee memorial painting ==
A memorial tablet depicts the family tree of William Lee (1545–1637), five times mayor of Abingdon, and his descendants. The memorial is referred to in Jerome K. Jerome's Three Men in a Boat:

"...and in St. Helen's Church, it is recorded that W. Lee, who died in 1637, "had in his lifetime issue from his loins two hundred lacking but three." If you work this out you will find that Mr. W. Lee's family numbered one hundred and ninety-seven. Mr. W. Lee – five times Mayor of Abingdon – was, no doubt, a benefactor to his generation, but I hope there are not many of his kind about in this overcrowded nineteenth century."

== Sources ==
- Page, WH; Ditchfield, PH, eds. (1924). A History of the County of Berkshire. Victoria County History. Vol. 4. assisted by John Hautenville Cope. London: The St Katherine Press. pp. 416–421.
- Pevsner, Nikolaus (1966). Berkshire. The Buildings of England. Harmondsworth: Penguin Books. pp. 51–53, 59.
