= St. Helen Without =

Civil parish in Oxfordshire, England

Coordinates: 51°41′21″N 1°18′51″W

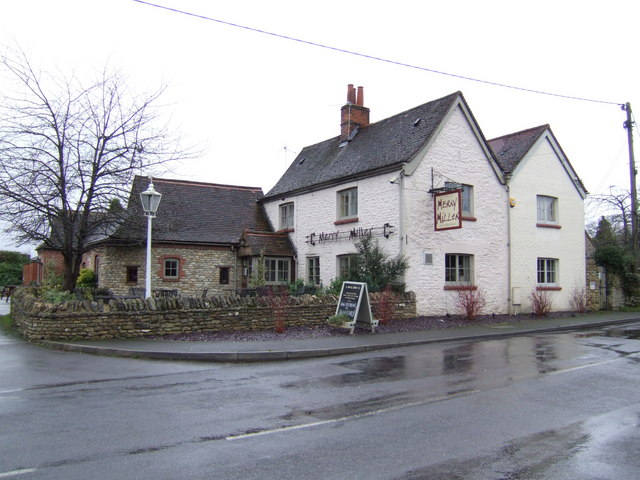
- The Merry Miller

- Location within Oxfordshire
- Population: 2,623 (2001 census)
- Civil parish: St. Helen Without
- District: Vale of White Horse
- Shire county: Oxfordshire
- Region: South East
- Country: England
- Sovereign state: United Kingdom
- UK Parliament: Oxford West and Abingdon

St Helen Without is a civil parish in the Vale of White Horse district in the English county of Oxfordshire. In 1974 it was transferred from Berkshire. It is immediately west of Abingdon and includes the villages of Dry Sandford and Shippon. A large part of the parish is occupied by Dalton Barracks and its associated airfield (formerly RAF Abingdon). According to the 2001 census the parish had a population of 2,623. The parish was created by the Local Government Act 1894, by the division of the parish of Abingdon St. Helen. The part inside Abingdon Municipal Borough became part of Abingdon parish, whilst that part outside became St. Helen Without. It became part of the Abingdon Rural District of Berkshire in 1894, and then part of the Vale of White Horse in Oxfordshire under the Local Government Act 1972.

== Sources ==
- Page, W.H; Ditchfield, D.H, eds. (1924). "Parishes: St. Helen's". A History of the County of Berkshire: Volume 4. Institute of Historical Research.
