= FitzHarris Castle =

Castle in the United Kingdom

- Oxfordshire, England
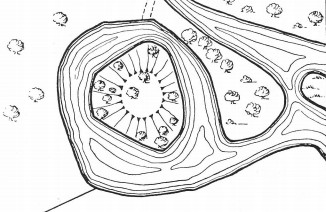
- Plan of the castle

Site information
- Type: Motte
- Owner: Local authority
- Open to the public: Yes
- Condition: Earthworks

Location
- Shown within Oxfordshire
- Coordinates: 51.6746°N 1.2833°W
- Grid reference: grid reference SU496975

Site history
- Built: between 1071 and 1084
- Built by: Owen
- In use: 1084 – c. 1247
- Fate: Demolished

FitzHarris Castle was a medieval castle located near Abingdon, Oxfordshire, England.

== History ==
FitzHarris Castle was built near Abingdon between 1071 and 1084 in the aftermath of the Norman invasion of England by a probable Norman knight called Owen. The castle formed a motte, 78 by 68 feet (24 by 21 m) across, protected by a stream that flowed around the motte to produce a moat. In due course the castle was supplemented by the nearby manor house called FitzHarry's, but a keep remained on the motte as late as 1247, probably for defensive purposes.

The castle is now owned by the local authority but is considered by English Heritage to be at risk from erosion due to visitor numbers. The site is a scheduled monument.

== See also ==
- Castles in Great Britain and Ireland
- List of castles in England

== Bibliography ==
- Preston, A. E. (1934) "A Moated Mound at Abingdon, Berks," The Berkshire Archaeological Journal 38, pp. 167–170.
