= King's Academy Easthampstead Park =

Location
- Ringmead; Bracknell, Berkshire, RG12 8FS; England
- 51.39851°N 0.7827°W

Information
- Type: Academy
- Established: 1972
- Local authority: Bracknell Forest
- Trust: King's Group Academies
- Department for Education URN: 149365 Tables
- Ofsted: Reports
- Executive Headteacher: David Littlemore
- Gender: Coeducational
- Age: 11 to 18
- Website: http://www.epschool.org/

King's Academy Easthampstead Park (formerly Easthampstead Park Community School) is a coeducational secondary school and sixth form located in Bracknell, Berkshire, England.

The school was opened in 1972 at which time it occupied the mansion that is now Easthampstead Park Conference Centre. Its first Headteacher was Derrick Hurd who had previously been the first Headteacher at John Mason School in Abingdon.

In 1995 the school moved into its current site

It was designated as a Sports College in 2009, and also won The Diana Anti Bullying award. for their work in peer mentoring.

The Executive Headteacher is David Littlemore and the Head of School is Matt Hall.

Previously a community school administered by Bracknell Forest Council, in November 2022 Easthampstead Park Community School converted to academy status and was renamed King's Academy Easthampstead Park. The school is now sponsored by the King's Group Academies.
