= Horns of Ock Street =

Insignia of the Abingdon Traditional Morris Dancers from Oxfordshire

The Horns of Ock Street are the insignia of the Abingdon Traditional Morris Dancers from the English county of Oxfordshire (formerly Berkshire).

They date from 1700. The road from Abingdon town centre to the north is called the Vineyard (because it passed through Abingdon Abbey's vineyard); that leading to the west, running parallel to the River Ock, is called Ock Street. Following a celebration in 1700, when an ox was roasted on the marketplace in the town centre, the "Vineyard men" fought with the "Ock Street men" for possession of the ox's horns. The Ock Street men won. Since then, the original Ock Street Horns, mounted in a carved wooden ox's head emblazoned with the date 1700, have served as the insignia of Abingdon's morris dancing side, and also of the independent spirit and character of the inhabitants of Ock Street. The original horns are only brought out for special occasions, like the mock-election of the Mayor of Ock Street. Instead a replica set from 1979 is used. Since 1976, the election of Mayor of Ock Street is held on the Saturday closest to June 19 and the mayor serves as a spokesperson for the area when the residents feel that the actual mayor isn't addressing their concerns.

A public house called The Ock Street Horns traded for many years in Ock Street boasting a large pair of replica horns above its front door. On its closure in 1960 these were moved to another Ock Street public house, the White Horse, where they are now on display.
