= Abingdon Schools Group =

Coordinates: 51°40′18″N 1°17′03″W

Abingdon Schools Group is a collective name for three merged independent schools based in and near Abingdon, Oxfordshire. It consists of Abingdon Preparatory School (formerly Josca's) as well as the Manor Prep School and Abingdon School. Collectively they offer education from age 4 to 18.

== Abingdon Preparatory School ==
The school is based in Frilford, Oxfordshire. It is a boys' school that offers education for pupils from 4 to 13. Until recently it was known as Josca's, but changed its name to integrate more with Abingdon School.

== Abingdon School ==
Abingdon School is based in Abingdon, Oxfordshire, and offers education from 11 to 18.
