= 12 Regiment RLC =

Regiment of the British Army's Royal Logistic Corps

12 Logistic Support Regiment
- Active: 2006 - 2013
- Country: United Kingdom
- Branch: British Army
- Role: Logistical Support Regiment
- Size: Regiment
- Part of: Royal Logistic Corps
- Garrison/HQ: Princess Royal Barracks
- Engagements: Northern Ireland; Iraq War

12 Regiment RLC was a regiment of the British Army's Royal Logistic Corps.

== History ==
From its formation in 2006 to its disbandment in 2013 the regiment was a logistic support regiment for the 4th Mechanized Brigade. In 2010 and again in 2012 the regiment deployed to Afghanistan as the Close Support Logistic Regiment on Herrick 12 and 17 respectively. During its six-month tour the regiment was tasked as a Combat Logistic Patrol.

== Structure ==
Organization of the regiment;

- 25 Headquarters Squadron
- 6 Close Support Squadron
- 11 General Support Squadron
- 43 Close Support Squadron
- Royal Electrical and Mechanical Engineers Light Aid Detachment
