= Frilford =

Hamlet in Oxfordshire, England

Coordinates: 51.671°N 1.362°W

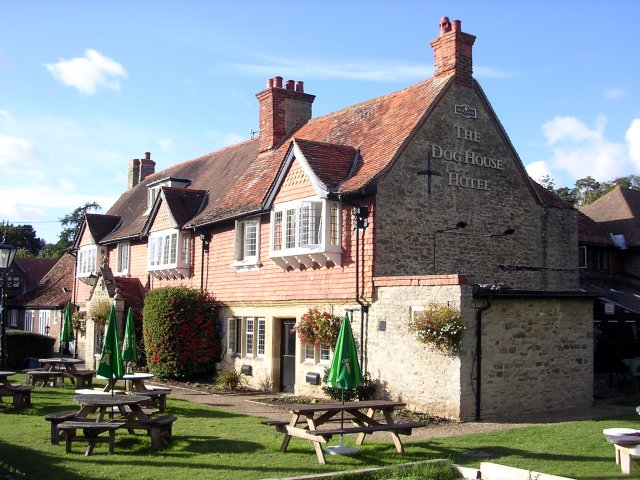
- Dog House Hotel, near Frilford Heath

- Location within Oxfordshire
- Population: 212 (2001 census)
- OS grid reference: SU4397
- Civil parish: Frilford
- District: Vale of White Horse
- Shire county: Oxfordshire
- Region: South East
- Country: England
- Sovereign state: United Kingdom
- Post town: Abingdon
- Postcode district: OX13
- Dialling code: 01865
- Police: Thames Valley
- Fire: Oxfordshire
- Ambulance: South Central
- UK Parliament: Witney

Frilford is a hamlet and civil parish in the Vale of White Horse district of Oxfordshire, England. It is about 3 miles (4.8 km) west of Abingdon at the junction of the A415 and A338 roads. It was part of Berkshire until it transferred to Oxfordshire in the 1974 boundary changes.

== Archaeology ==
The parish of Frilford has two significant archaeological sites: a Roman villa, and a cemetery on Frilford Heath that appears to include both Roman and Saxon burials. A further complex of remains, including a Roman shrine and amphitheatre, is often referred to as being in Frilford but lies to the south of the village, just inside the boundary of Marcham parish.

== Churches ==
Frilford is part of the Church of England parish of Marcham. It has no Church of England parish church of its own, but a Congregational chapel was built at Frilford in 1841.

== Amenities ==
Frilford Heath Golf Club is to the east of the village. Abingdon Preparatory School at Frilford, formerly Joscas, is a preparatory school.

== Transport ==
Three Stagecoach in Oxfordshire bus routes serve Frilford. Route 15 to Witney and Abingdon. Routes S8 (via Abingdon) and S9 (via Cumnor) to Wantage and Oxford.

== People ==
Notable people from Frilford include Dr Gary Botting, born at Oakley House Maternity Hospital on 19 July 1943, who became a noted Canadian extradition lawyer.

== Sources & further reading ==
- Akerman, 1865. Report on excavations in an ancient cemetery at Frilford. Proceedings of the Society of Antiquaries of London, 3, 136–41
- Bradford, J.S.P.; Goodchild, R.G. (1939). "Excavations at Frilford, Berks, 1937-8" (PDF). Oxoniensia. 4: 1–80.
- Haverfield, F. 1897. A Roman villa at Frilford. Archaeological Journal, 54, 340–54
- Page, W.H.; Ditchfield, P.H., eds. (1924). A History of the County of Berkshire, Volume 4. Victoria County History. pp. 354–360.
- Pevsner, Nikolaus (1966). Berkshire. The Buildings of England. Harmondsworth: Penguin Books. p. 144.
- Rolleston, G. 1869. Researches and excavations at an ancient cemetery at Frilford. Archaeologia, 42, 417-85 doi:10.1017/S0261340900003301
- Rolleston, G. 1880. Further researches in an Anglo-Saxon cemetery at Frilford. Archaeologia, 45, 405-10
