= Larkmead, West Virginia =

Larkmead
- Unincorporated community
- Location within the state of West Virginia Larkmead (the United States)
- Coordinates: 39°14′54″N 81°35′31″W
- Country: United States
- State: West Virginia
- County: Wood
- Elevation: 617 ft (188 m)
- Time zone: UTC-5 (Eastern (EST))
  - Summer (DST): UTC-4 (EDT)
- GNIS ID: 1554913

Larkmead is an unincorporated community in Wood County, West Virginia, United States.
