= River Ock =

River in Oxfordshire, England

Coordinates: 51°40′N 1°17′W

Ock
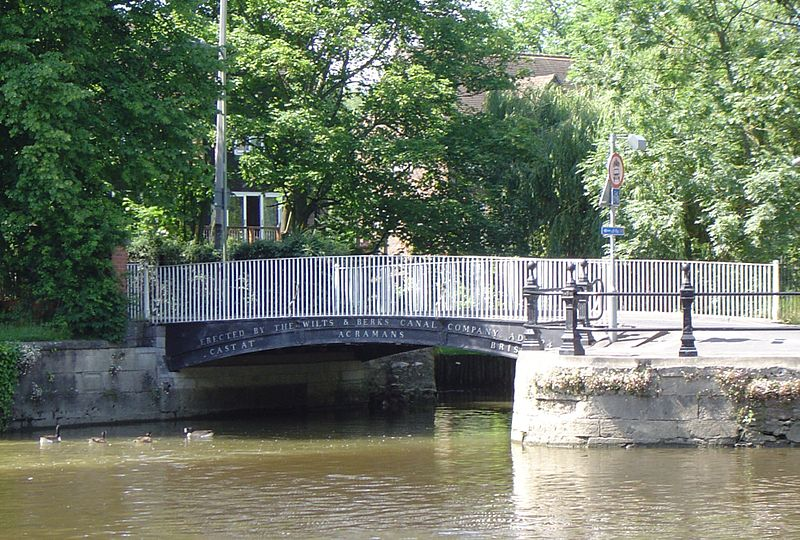
- Bridge across the River Ock as it flows into the Thames at Abingdon

Location
- Country: England
- Counties: Oxfordshire
- Towns: Abingdon-on-Thames

Physical characteristics
- Source
  - location: Little Coxwell, White Horse Hills
- Mouth: River Thames
  - location: Abingdon-on-Thames, Oxfordshire
- Length: 34 km (21 mi)
- Discharge
  - location: Abingdon-on-Thames
  - average: 1.52 m^{3}/s (54 cu ft/s)
  - minimum: 0.11 m^{3}/s (3.9 cu ft/s)23 August 1976
  - maximum: 15.8 m^{3}/s (560 cu ft/s)6 March 1972

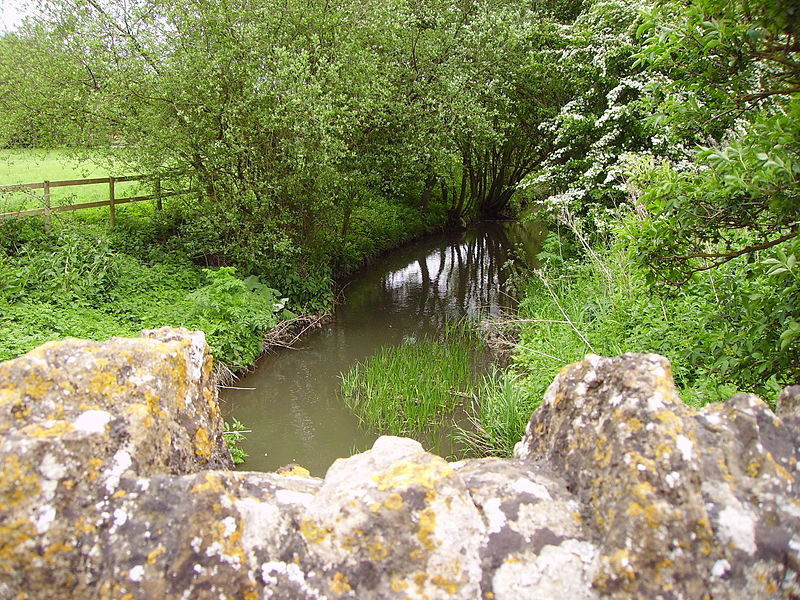
The River Ock heads towards Abingdon, from the bridge at Charney Bassett

The River Ock is a small English river which is a tributary of the River Thames. It has as its catchment area the Vale of White Horse, a low-lying and wide valley in south Oxfordshire, and flows into the River Thames, at Abingdon on the reach above Culham Lock.

== Course ==
The River Ock rises near the village of Little Coxwell. It collects tributaries from each village along the base of the White Horse Hills, where springs emanating from the chalk hills allowed settlements to flourish in former times. Among these tributaries is the Osse Stream, rising in Cumnor.

From Little Coxwell, the Ock runs around Longcot and flows past Stanford in the Vale, where it is about 10 feet (3 m) wide. The name of Stanford comes from stony ford, possibly alluding to the Ock crossing at Stanford Mill. Thence it runs past Charney Bassett, Lyford, Garford and Marcham Mill, before losing its identity and its waters to the Thames at Abingdon by the old Hygienic Laundry building. An iron bridge crosses at the junction which was built by the Wilts & Berks Canal Company. This gives the erroneous impression that the Ock is that canal, but in fact the original canal entrance a few yards downstream is now blocked up. This has been replaced under a restoration project by a newer entrance closer to Culham Lock.

The soils through which the River Ock flows are the Jurassic sedimentary series (Greensands, Gault, Kimmeridge Clay and corallian limestone), while some of its tributaries arise in chalk springs. Until recent times, native crayfish and many freshwater fish species inhabited the river. Increased housing in the Vale, with the resultant surface drainage, may have threatened these species but surveys have not yet been performed in the 21st century.

Although normally placid, the Ock can flood low-lying areas of south Abingdon after persistent heavy rainfall; this recently occurred in April 2023, January 2024, September 2024 and November 2024.

== Name ==
The hydronym Ock appears to be derived from a Celtic word for 'salmon'.

== See also ==
- Tributaries of the River Thames
- List of rivers of England

Next confluence upstream	River Thames	Next confluence downstream
Hinksey Stream (south)	River Ock	Wilts & Berks Canal (south)
