= Larkmead School =

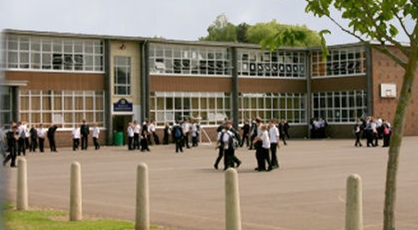
- Larkmead School, Abingdon, Oxfordshire.

Location
- Faringdon Road; Abingdon-on-Thames, Oxfordshire, OX14 1RF; England; 51.677°N 1.300°W

Information
- Type: Academy
- Established: 1956
- Local authority: Oxfordshire County Council
- Trust: Vale Academy Trust
- Department for Education URN: 143890 Tables
- Ofsted: Reports
- Gender: Coeducational
- Age: 11 to 18
- Enrolment: c. 800
- Website: larkmead-school.com

Larkmead School is a co-educational secondary school and sixth form situated on Faringdon Road, in Abingdon-on-Thames, Oxfordshire, England.

== History ==
At the close of the Second World War in 1945, and the introduction of primary and secondary education under R.A. Butler's Education Act 1944, Abingdon borough decided that a larger school was needed. The names Larkhill and Willowside were originally suggested for the school, but in the end the name 'Larkmead' was settled upon.

The school's buildings were completed by Easter 1956, and on 8 June the school was officially opened by Sir John Douglas Cockcroft. Several additions were made to the school over the coming years, including a kitchen in 1958, a caretaker's bungalow and swimming pool in 1960, and a new Design Technology building in 1969.

In 1972, with the school preparing for comprehensive status, it was deemed necessary to update and extend the school's buildings. A new collection of buildings were built away from the main teaching areas to house the administrative centre of the school, where the office and Learning Resource Centre were situated.

Since its inception the school has made several additions to its buildings, including a music centre with a performance room and several practice and technology rooms, which is now shared by the Abingdon Music Centre.

Previously a community school administered by Oxfordshire County Council, in January 2017 Larkmead School converted to academy status. The school is now sponsored by the Cambrian Learning Trust (previously Vale Academy Trust).
