= Abingdon-on-Thames =

Market town in Oxfordshire, England

Coordinates: 51°40′18″N 01°16′42″W

Abingdon-on-Thames: Abingdon
- Market town
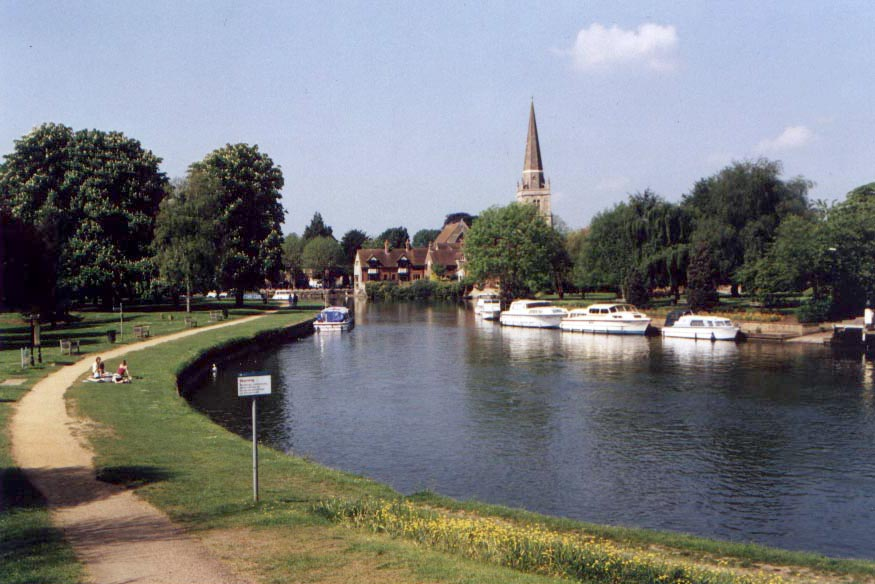
- The River Thames at Abingdon looking towards St. Helen's parish church

- Coat of arms of Abingdon: Vert a Cross patonce Or between four Crosses pattée Argent

- Location within Oxfordshire
- Area: 9.09 km^{2} (3.51 sq mi)
- Population: 37,931 (2021 census)
  - Density: 4,173/km^{2} (10,810/sq mi)
- OS grid reference: SU4997
  - London: 51.1 mi (82.2 km)
- Civil parish: Abingdon on Thames
- District: Vale of White Horse
- Shire county: Oxfordshire
- Region: South East
- Country: England
- Sovereign state: United Kingdom
- Post town: Abingdon
- Postcode district: OX14
- Dialling code: 01235
- Police: Thames Valley
- Fire: Oxfordshire
- Ambulance: South Central
- UK Parliament: Oxford West and Abingdon
- Website: abingdon.gov.uk

Abingdon-on-Thames (/ˈæbɪŋdən/ AB-ing-dən), commonly known as Abingdon, is a historic market town and civil parish on the River Thames in the Vale of the White Horse district of Oxfordshire, England. The historic county town of Berkshire, the area was occupied from the early to middle Iron Age and the remains of a late Iron Age and Roman defensive enclosure lies below the town centre. Abingdon Abbey was founded around 676 AD, giving its name to the emerging town. In the 13th and 14th centuries, Abingdon was an agricultural centre with an extensive trade in wool, alongside weaving and the manufacture of clothing. Charters for the holding of markets and fairs were granted by various monarchs, from Edward I to George II.

The town survived the dissolution of the abbey in 1538 and by the 18th and 19th centuries, with the building of Abingdon Lock in 1790 and the Wilts & Berks Canal in 1810, Abingdon was on important routes for goods transport. In 1856 the Abingdon Railway opened, linking the town with the Great Western Railway. The canal was abandoned in 1906 but a voluntary trust is now working to restore and reopen it. Abingdon railway station was closed to passengers in September 1963. The line remained open for goods until 1984, its role including serving the MG car factory, which operated from 1929 to 1980.

Abingdon's brewery, Morland, makers of Old Speckled Hen ale, was taken over and closed in 1999; the site of the brewery has been redeveloped into housing. The rock band Radiohead formed in 1985 when its members were studying at Abingdon School, a day and boarding independent secondary school. The 2011 census recorded the parish's population as 33,130.

== History ==
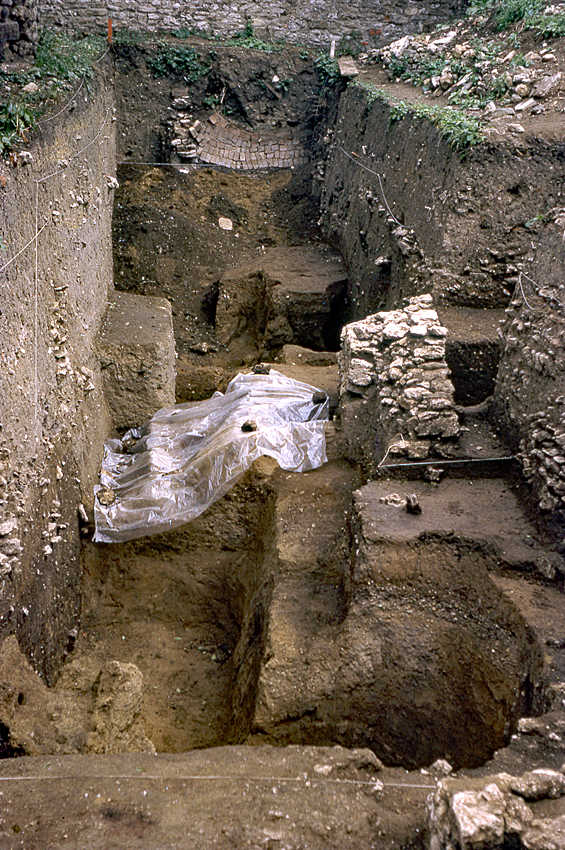
Excavating a Roman villa at Barton Court Farm

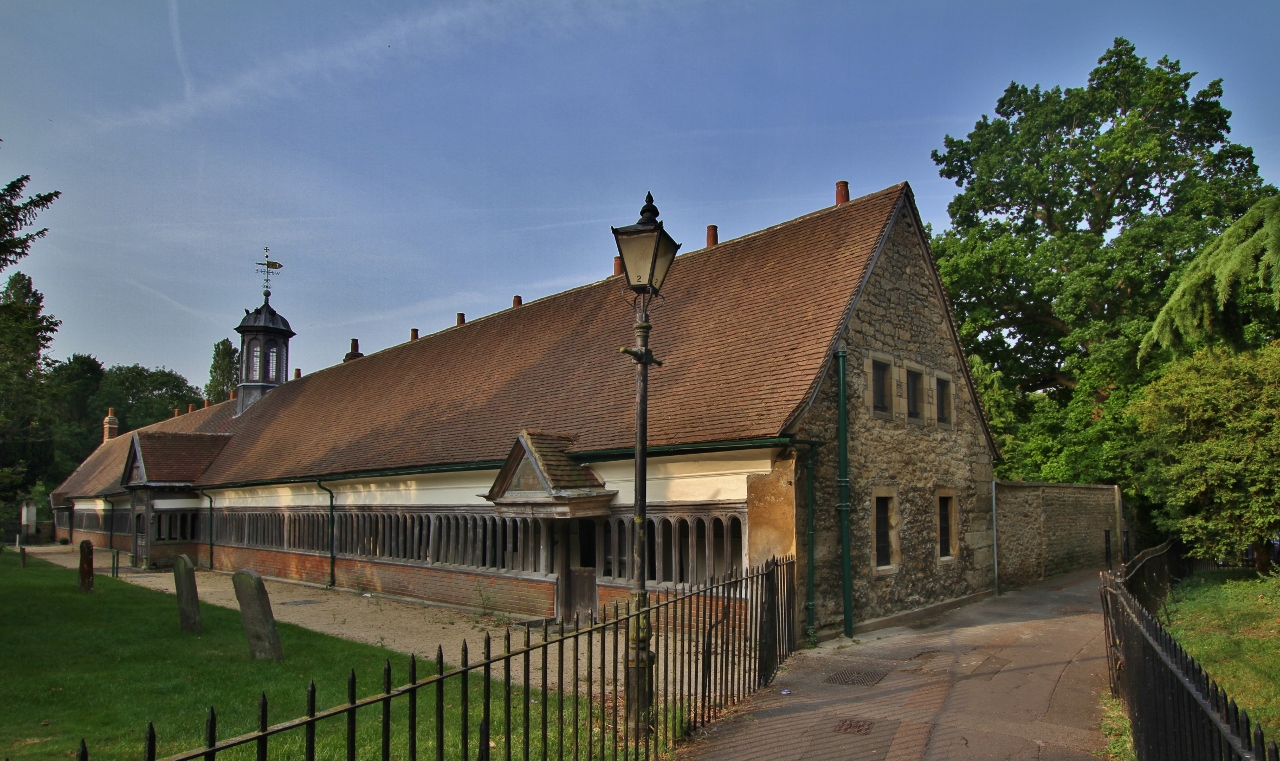
Long Alley Almshouses next to St Helen's parish church

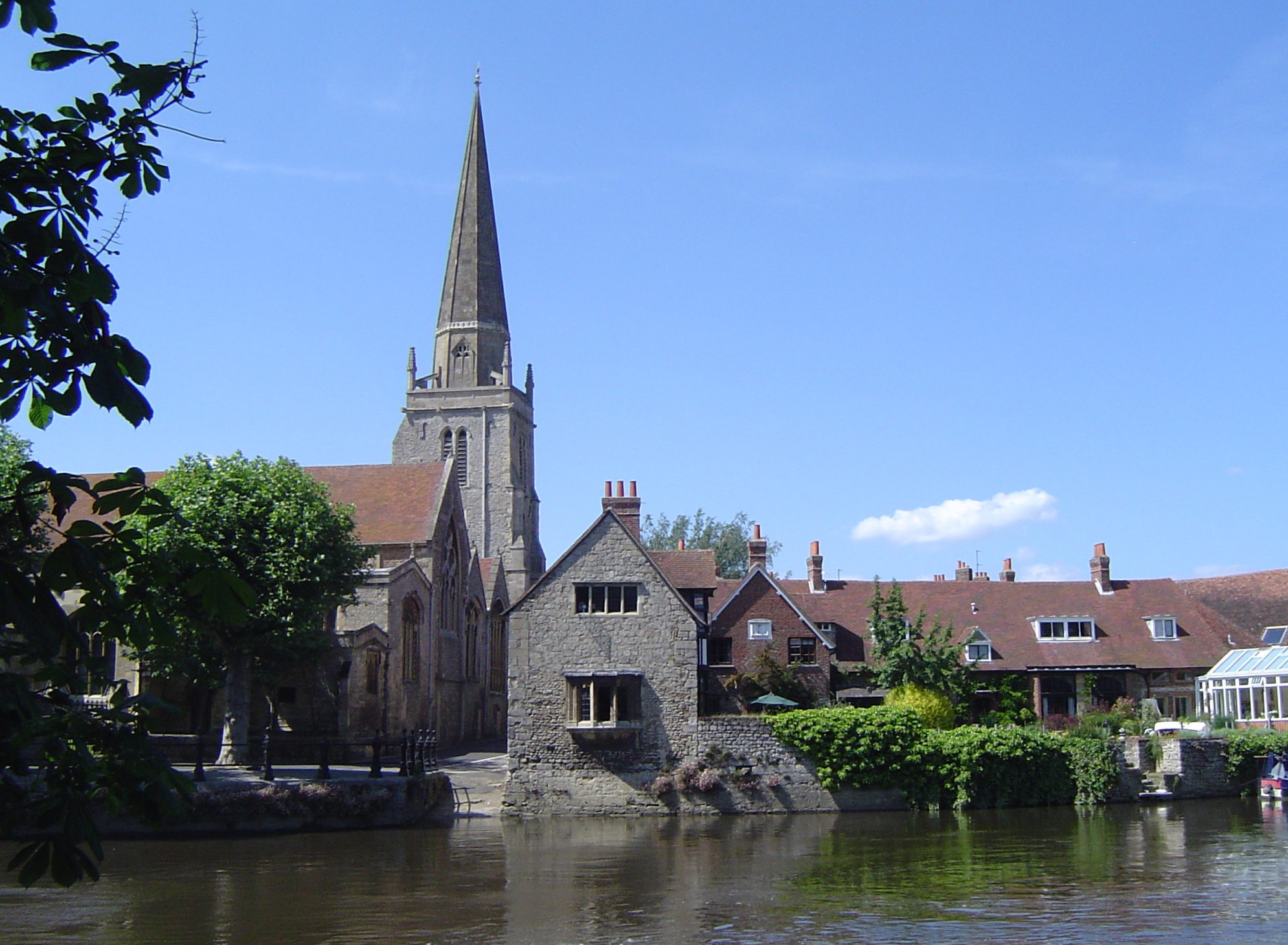
St Helen's parish church from across the Thames

A Neolithic stone hand axe was found at Abingdon. Petrological analysis in 1940 identified the stone as epidotised tuff from Stake Pass in the Lake District, 250 mi (400 km) to the north. Stone axes from the same source have been found at Sutton Courtenay, Alvescot, Kencot and Minster Lovell. A Neolithic causewayed enclosure was found in Abingdon, dating to the 36th or 37th century BC. It was found in 1926 while quarrying for gravel, and was partly excavated in 1926 and 1927 by E.T. Leeds. Subsequent excavations took place in 1954 and 1963.

Abingdon has also been occupied from the early to middle Iron Age and the remains of a late Iron Age defensive enclosure (or oppidum) lie below the town centre. The oppidum was in use throughout the Roman occupation. A Roman villa and subsequent Saxon farmstead buildings have been excavated at Barton Court Farm.

Abingdon Abbey was founded in Saxon times, possibly around 676, but its early history is confused by numerous legends, invented to raise its status and explain the place name. The name seems to mean 'Hill of a man named Æbba, or a woman named Æbbe', possibly the saint to whom St Ebbe's Church in Oxford was dedicated (Æbbe of Coldingham or a different Æbbe of Oxford). However, Abingdon stands in a valley and not on a hill. It is thought that the name was first given to a place on Boars Hill above Chilswell, and the name was transferred to its present site when the Abbey was moved. In 1084, William the Conqueror celebrated Easter at the Abbey and it is possible that his son Henry I received some schooling at the abbey.

In the 13th and 14th centuries, Abingdon was a flourishing agricultural centre with an extensive trade in wool and a famous weaving and clothing manufacturing industry. The abbot seems to have held a market from very early times and charters for the holding of markets and fairs were granted by various sovereigns, from Edward I to George II. In 1337 there was a famous riot in protest at the Abbot's control of this market in which several of the monks were killed. After the abbey's dissolution in 1538, the town sank into decay.

In 1556, upon receiving a representation of its pitiable condition, Mary I granted a charter incorporating the town as a borough, governed by a mayor, two bailiffs, twelve chief burgesses and sixteen secondary burgesses, the mayor to be clerk of the market, coroner and a JP. The present Christ's Hospital originally belonged to the Guild of the Holy Cross, on the dissolution of which Edward VI founded the almshouses instead, under its present name.

The borough elected one member of parliament; this right would continue until the Redistribution of Seats Act 1885. The 1556 charter also catered for the appointment of a town clerk and other officers, and the borough boundaries were described in detail. Later charters, from Elizabeth I, James I, James II, George II and George III, made no considerable change. James II changed the style of the corporation to that of a mayor, twelve aldermen and twelve burgesses.

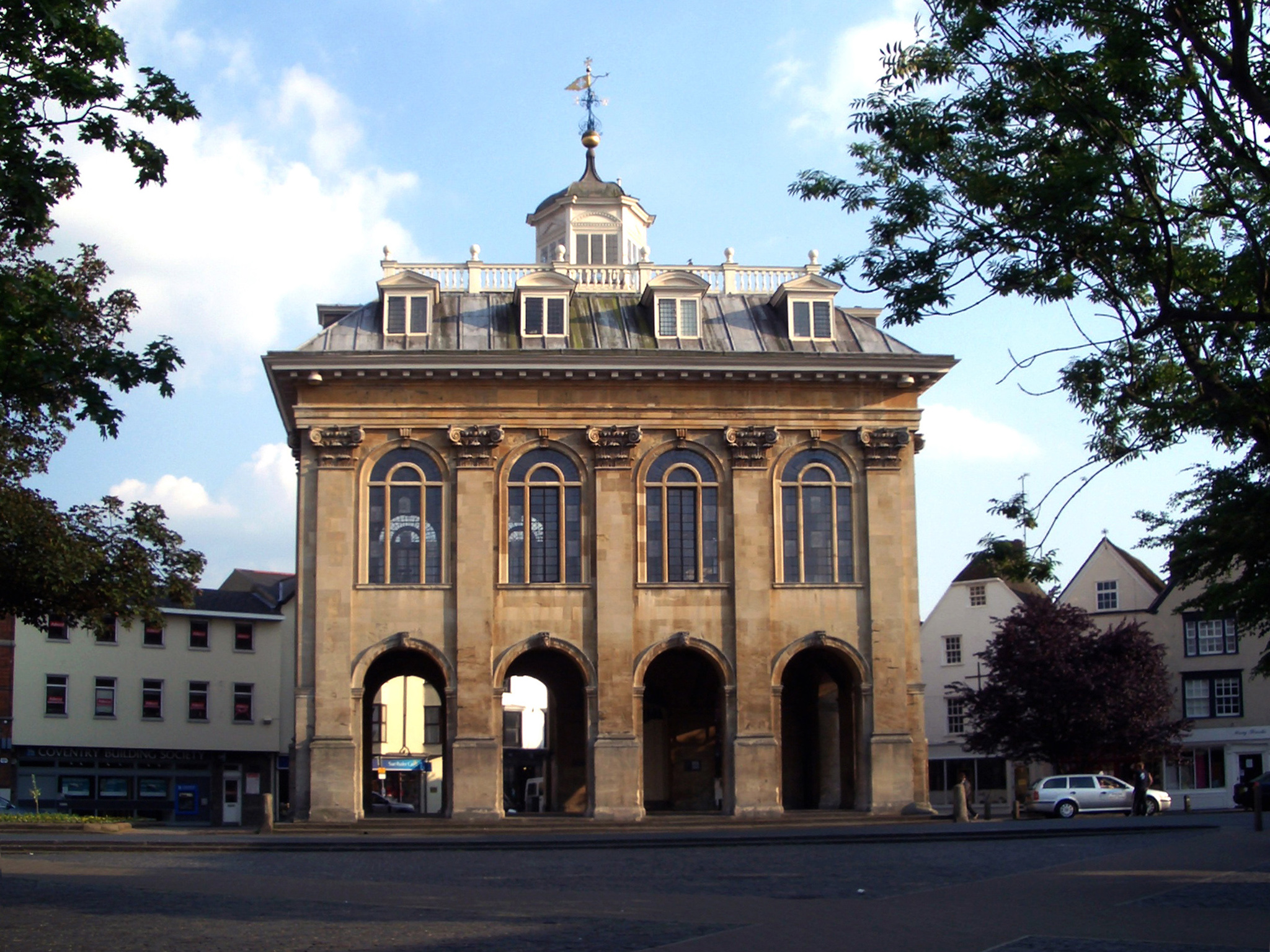
County Hall, completed in 1680

Abingdon became the county town of Berkshire sometime after receiving its charter in 1556. Assize courts were held in Abingdon from 1570, but in the 17th century it was vying with Reading for county town status. The county hall and court house were built between 1678 and 1682, to assert this status. The building, now the Abingdon County Hall Museum, was reputedly designed by Christopher Kempster, who worked with Sir Christopher Wren.

Abingdon borough police was the police force responsible for policing the Borough until 1889. It was formed as a result of the Municipal Corporations Act 1835. The force was amalgamated into the Berkshire Constabulary following the Local Government Act 1888, which required all boroughs with populations of less than 10,000 to amalgamate their police forces with their adjoining county constabulary. Today, the area is policed by the successor to Berkshire Constabulary, Thames Valley Police.

In 1790 Abingdon Lock was built, replacing navigation via the Swift Ditch. In 1810, the Wilts & Berks Canal opened, linking Abingdon with Semington on the Kennet and Avon Canal. Abingdon became a key link between major industrial centres such as Bristol, London, Birmingham and the Black Country. In 1856 the Abingdon Railway opened, linking the town with the Great Western Railway at Radley. However, Abingdon's failure to engage fully with the railway revolution, accepting only a branch line, sidelined the town in favour of Reading which became the County Town in 1869.

The Wilts & Berks Canal was abandoned in 1906 but a voluntary trust is now working to restore and re-open it. Abingdon railway station was closed to passengers in September 1963. The line remained open for goods until 1984, including serving the MG car factory, which opened in 1929 and closed in October 1980 as part of a British Leyland rationalisation plan. The nearest railway station is Radley, two miles (3.2 km) away. Much of the original Abingdon branch line is now a cycle path, whilst the land on which the station stood has been extensively redeveloped, and is now the site of a large Waitrose store and surrounded by a large number of new flats and houses.

The corporation was reformed, under the Municipal Corporations Act 1835, but was abolished under the Local Government Act 1972, which enacted extensive local government reorganisation across England and Wales with effect from 1 April 1974. As a result of this reorganisation, Berkshire County Council's northern boundary was much reduced and Abingdon's governance was transferred to Oxfordshire, with the town becoming the seat of the new Vale of White Horse District Council, and Abingdon becoming a civil parish with a town council. Since the 1980s, Abingdon has played host to a number of information communication companies, with many based in the town's respective business and science parks. As a consequence, and owing to Abingdon's proximity to academic and scientific institutions in Oxford, the town has seen an influx of young professionals taking residence in the town's many residential areas such as Peachcroft.

The town was sometimes historically called "Abingdon-on-Thames", but the official name of the borough (as given in statutes from the Municipal Corporations Act 1835 to the Local Government Act 1972 and all intervening Ordnance Survey maps) was simply "Abingdon". Local councillors voted in November 2011 to change the official name of the town to "Abingdon-on-Thames", and the change took effect on 23 February 2012.

== Leisure and media ==
Sport and recreation facilities include the White Horse Leisure and Tennis Centre, Tilsley Park and the Southern Town Park. Abingdon had four cinemas but all have closed. The last was the Regal, which closed in 1989. It stood derelict for 24 years until it was demolished in 2003 and replaced by housing development, Regal Close. The Unicorn theatre was built in an area called The Checkers Hall in the ruins of the Abbey buildings and shows plays and films on an irregular basis. In addition, a new cinema, called the Abbey Cinema has been built in one of the town council buildings and operates in conjunction with the Regal in Evesham.

The local newspapers are The Oxford Times, Oxford Mail and Abingdon Herald. The Oxfordshire Guardian, a free newspaper, was based in Abingdon for many years and was founded as the South Oxfordshire Courier until its closure in 2018. Local radio and television stations are shared with Oxford, although ITV retains a news gathering centre in nearby Milton Park (formerly having a broadcasting studio in the town) for ITV Meridian. Historically the ITV franchise was ITV Central. Local analogue radio is provided by BBC Radio Oxford, Greatest Hits Radio and Heart South (historically 'Fox FM' and later 'Heart Thames Valley'), while the town is also covered by the Oxfordshire DAB multiplex. There was a Six TV local TV channel until 2009 and the town's further education college was the home to That's TV studios for Oxfordshire until it relocated to Oxford Science Park.

The Tesco Extra store west of the town is the largest supermarket in Abingdon and has historically been one of the most profitable Tesco stores in the country. Nearby is the Fairacres Retail Park, thought to be the first retail park in the UK and recently redeveloped, which includes Argos, Subway, B & M, Dreams and Pets at Home stores. It originally had two long established Abingdon retailers—Vineys Home Furnishings (now part of the Lee Longlands chain but retains its name) and Mays Carpets (now part of the Carpetright chain and has re-branded accordingly). In the town centre, many independent stores, estate agents and charity shops make up the Bury Street shopping centre as major high street names have chosen to go to other towns.

The town centre of Abingdon was renovated in 2012 as part of the council's redevelopment plan, with the 1970s shopping precinct converted to look more modern. The roads around the area have been changed: notably the one-way system around the centre has been partially changed to two-way. While this has slightly reduced traffic within the historic town centre, congestion has greatly increased elsewhere. Local businesses have also complained that the increased traffic has driven shoppers away. Redevelopment of the Old Gaol site, most recently a leisure centre, began in 2010. The first stage was demolishing the 1970s additions and swimming pool extension. The Gaol has been converted into luxury flats, shops and restaurants, with access to the riverside.

== Sport ==
Abingdon has two non-League football teams: Abingdon United F.C., who compete in the Combined Counties League Premier Division North and play at The Armadillo Energy Stadium, and Abingdon Town F.C., who play at Culham Road. Abingdon Golf Club/North Berks Golf Club (now defunct) was first mentioned in 1876. The club disappeared at the time of the Second World War The Oxford Saints American football Club play their games in Abingdon at Tilsley Park and are one of the longest-running American football clubs in the UK, founded in 1983. Abingdon is home to Abingdon Rowing Club, with members from 13 to 80 years old. It has had many successes at local and national races, and also holds its own Abingdon Head race in April, one of the main events in the Abingdon Calendar. Its boathouse is on Wilsham Road. Abingdon Amblers changed its name to Abingdon Athletics Club. They train at Tilsley Park and take part in county cross-country leagues.

Abingdon RUFC was formed at the Queens Hotel on 27 February 1931. During the 1930s the club was based at the Queens Hotel and games were played on the council owned recreation ground at Caldecott Road. Immediately after the Second World War the club moved to outside the RAF camp (now Dalton Barracks) which offered on-site changing facilities and later a pitch inside the camp. At the start of the Suez Crisis in 1956 play temporarily returned to the Caldecott Road site because of security risks. This period saw the formation of the ill-fated Abingdon Sports Club; an amalgamation of the town's rugby, cricket and hockey clubs and the bid to establish a sporting centre at Hales Meadow. In a short time the ground was developed and a pavilion erected but the organisation was plagued with financial difficulties and very soon dissolved with hockey disbanding and Abingdon Rugby remaining at the site as tenants to the cricket club. In the mid-1980s a determined effort was made to acquire grounds and a clubhouse dedicated to rugby. In 2022 Abingdon Women's Rugby Club known as "The Albatrosses" was formed and they currently play in the Inner Warrior League.

The current base at the town's Southern Sports Park was opened by former Abingdon MP John Patten in 1989. Abingdon has had members representing the county, progressing to first-class level and on to international status in the Six Nations Tournament. The Abingdon Sevens traditionally opens the Home Counties' playing season and has attracted sides from throughout the country and beyond. Initiated in 1956 as a one-off tournament to celebrate the town's 400th anniversary of receiving a royal charter, it proved so successful that the competition has been held on an annual basis ever since. Several years ago it was decided to introduce the youngsters of Abingdon to Club Rugby. The Youth Section has 200 playing members from the ages of 6 to 18. In 2013–14 Abingdon RFC's president, Paul Murphy MBE, was also the president of the RFU. Since 2016, Oxford Rugby League have played in Abingdon at Abingdon School's Tilsley Park.

== Economy ==
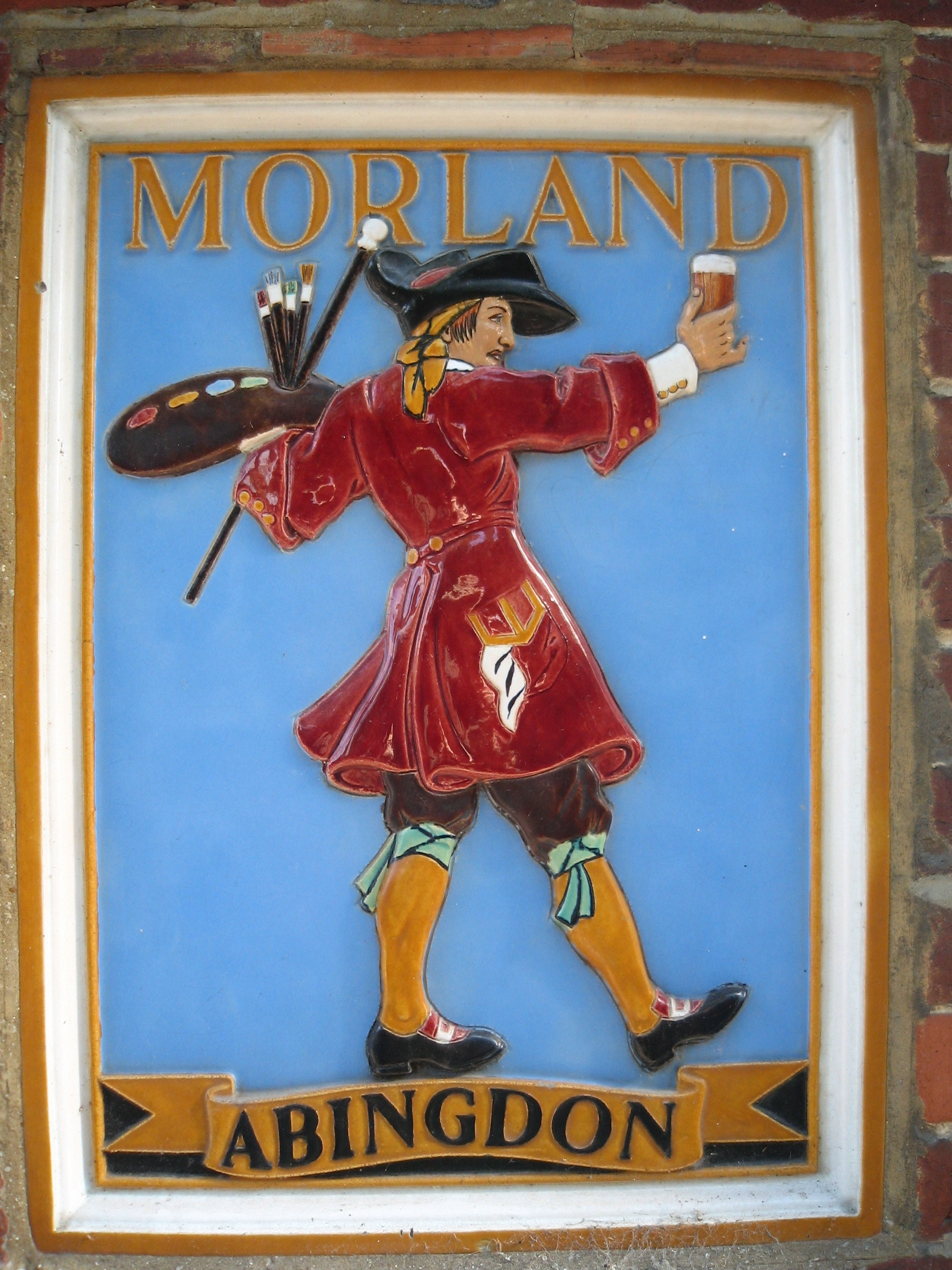
Morland Brewery Painter Ceramic Plaque which graces actual & former Morland Pubs in Abingdon and elsewhere.

Malting and brewing had been carried out for centuries in Abingdon, and by Victorian times there were many malthouses in the town. Eventually, the Morland Brewery predominated. It had been established by a farmer, John Morland in 1711. Morland's most famous ale was Old Speckled Hen, named after an early prototype MG car. Greene King Brewery bought Morland for £182 million in 1999, closed the brewery and moved production to Bury St Edmunds in Suffolk. The site of the brewery has been redeveloped into housing. The Maltings was demolished and is now a mixed residential area and council offices. In 2010, a craft brewery, Loose Cannon, reinstated brewing in the town at the Drayton Road Industrial Estate and sells its beers locally, including on draught at some local pubs.

The Pavlova and Gloria leather works were major employers but both are now closed. Alfred Booth and Company of Liverpool traded with the Pavlova Leather Syndicate from 1860, bought a share in it in 1917–18 and took it over in 1921. In May 1947 at the annual British Industries Fair in Birmingham, Pavlova advertised doe skins, chamois, lambskins and goatskins, much of it as suede, for uses including shoes, gloves and belts. In 1958 Pavlova's site covered 35 acres (14 ha), employed nearly 200 people and included a staff sports field. At that time its factory still processed imported skins of sheep, lamb and goat, mainly to make suede. Garner Group took over the Booth Group in 1979 and became Garner Booth. Pittards plc took over Garner Booth in 1987 and became Pittard Garner. It closed the Pavlova works in 1993.

Hemp-dressing, matting, sackcloth and carpet–weaving were a substantial source of employment in the early 19th century and the first satisfactory yarn and cloth made from jute were produced in Abingdon. There were 22 sacking manufacturers and 3 matting manufacturers in the town in 1830. A carpet factory was built on the island between the Mill race and the river – opposite The Nag's Head. The Abingdon Carpet Manufacturing Company was run by George Shepherd from 1879 and produced carpets, rugs, and rush and coconut-fibre matting. Foreign competition led to its closure in the early 1930s. A clothing business on the West side of the lower end of St. Helen's Street started as a shop in mid 1700s run by John Hyde and was developed into a factory in the early 1800s. The site was owned by a hemp and linen manufacturer called James Varley who had lost much of his business in a fire in 1838 and became the property of John Hyde and Son clothes dealers and frock makers, in about 1844. This business prospered, especially during the American Civil War and lasted until 1931.

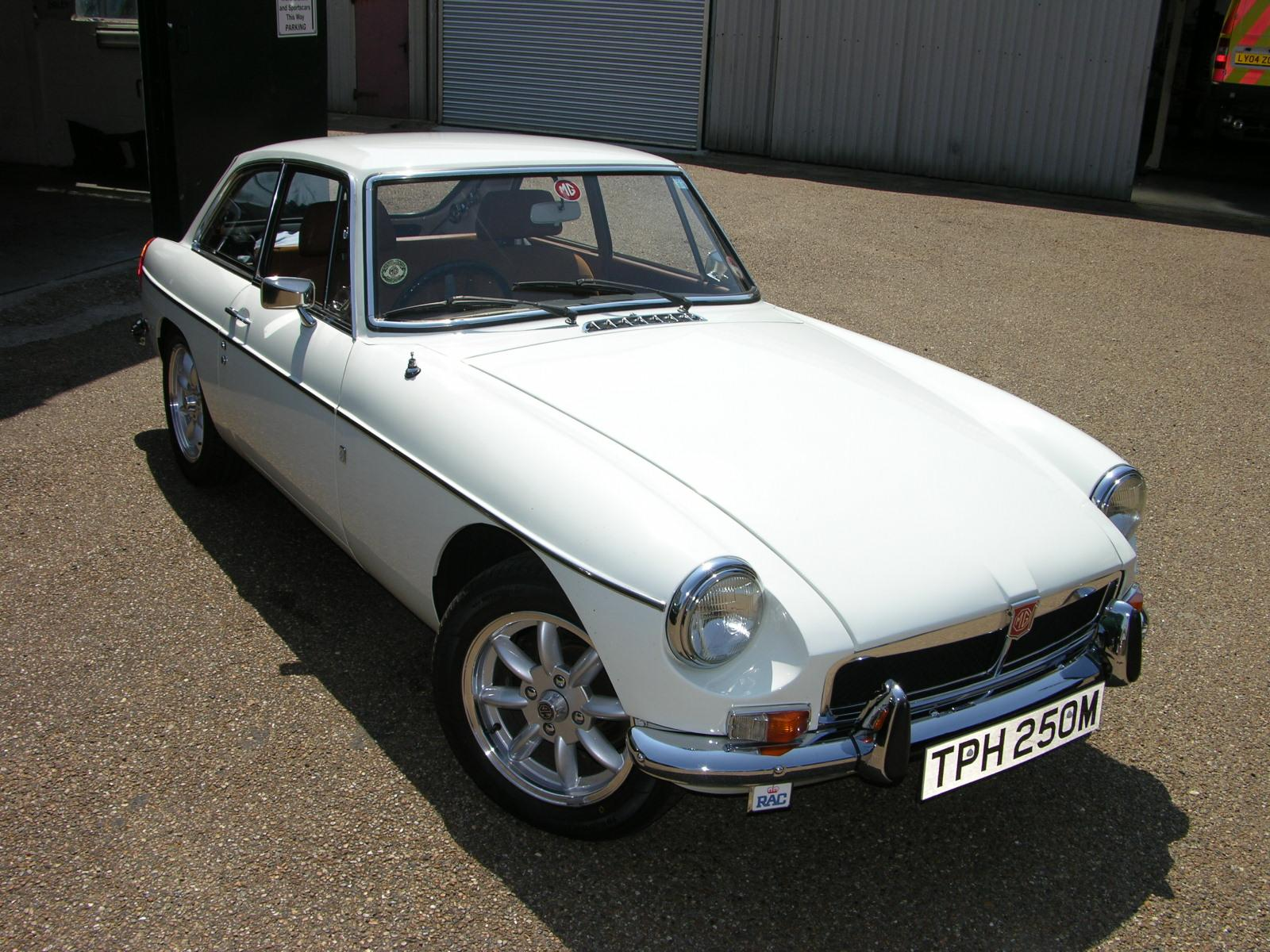
1974 MGB GT sports car

Industrially, Abingdon was best known for the MG car factory, which opened in 1929. 1,155,032 cars were made at the plant over the following 51 years until British Leyland closed it on 24 October 1980. Subsequent cars sold under the MG brand have since been produced either at Longbridge in Birmingham or at SAIC's factories in China. The company was founded in 1924 and moved its business alongside the Pavlova Leather Factory in 1929. By the outbreak of the Second World War, MG was established as one of the most popular brands of sports car in Britain. During the war the factory was used for a variety of war work. After the war, the MG factory continued to turn out increasing volumes of popular sports cars that were available at competitive prices, but it closed in October 1980 on the demise of the ageing but still popular MG MGB range, and was demolished within months. The headquarters of the MG Car Club, founded in 1930, is at 11 & 12 Cemetery Road, next to the old factory offices. A police station was built in its place, which was later extended with the addition of more cells, as Oxford's police station could not be extended further.

The Abingdon Science Park includes the global headquarters of Sophos, an anti-virus company and Penlon Ltd, a medical equipment company, (their previous site, near the former railway station, has been redeveloped as residential housing). Another major employer is the British head office of the German appliance company Miele. RM, an educational computing supplier, commonly refer to themselves as being Abingdon-based, which is technically true—even though their HQ is actually in nearby Milton Park, Milton, they have an Abingdon post code (as does the rest of Milton Park).

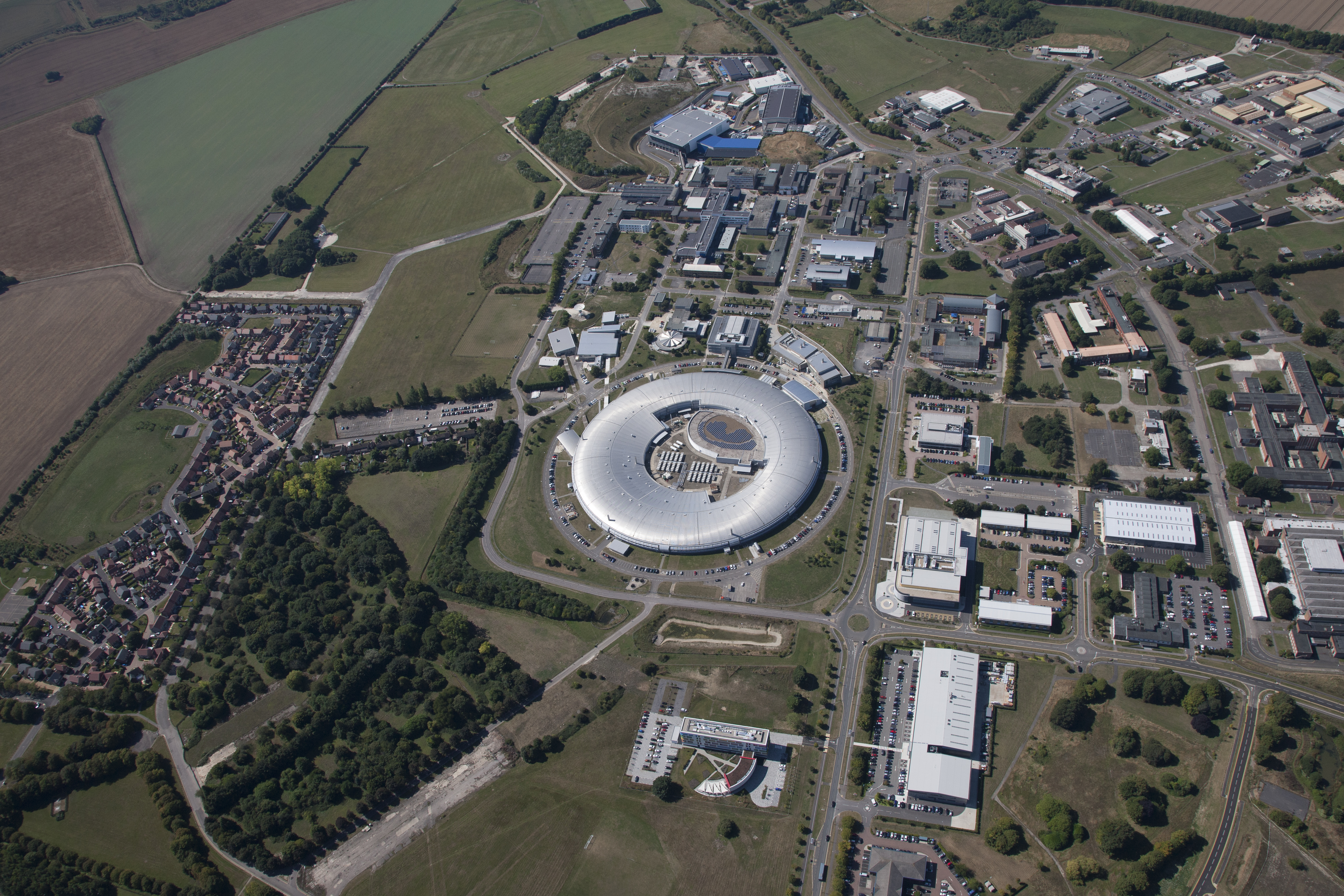
Harwell campus with its Diamond Light Source synchrotron

Abingdon also has a business park which has offices for several local, national and international companies including, until recently, Vodafone (acquired as part of its takeover of Mannesmann in 2000) and Northern Rock bank.

Abingdon is near several major scientific employers: the UKAEA at Culham (including the Joint European Torus (JET) fusion research project), Harwell Laboratory, the STFC Rutherford Appleton Laboratory and the Diamond Light Source synchrotron, which is the largest UK-funded scientific facility to be built for over 40 years. Many inhabitants work in Oxford or commute by rail to London, from nearby Didcot. The Army now occupies Dalton Barracks, which, prior to 1993, was the Royal Air Force station RAF Abingdon.

== Geography and transport ==
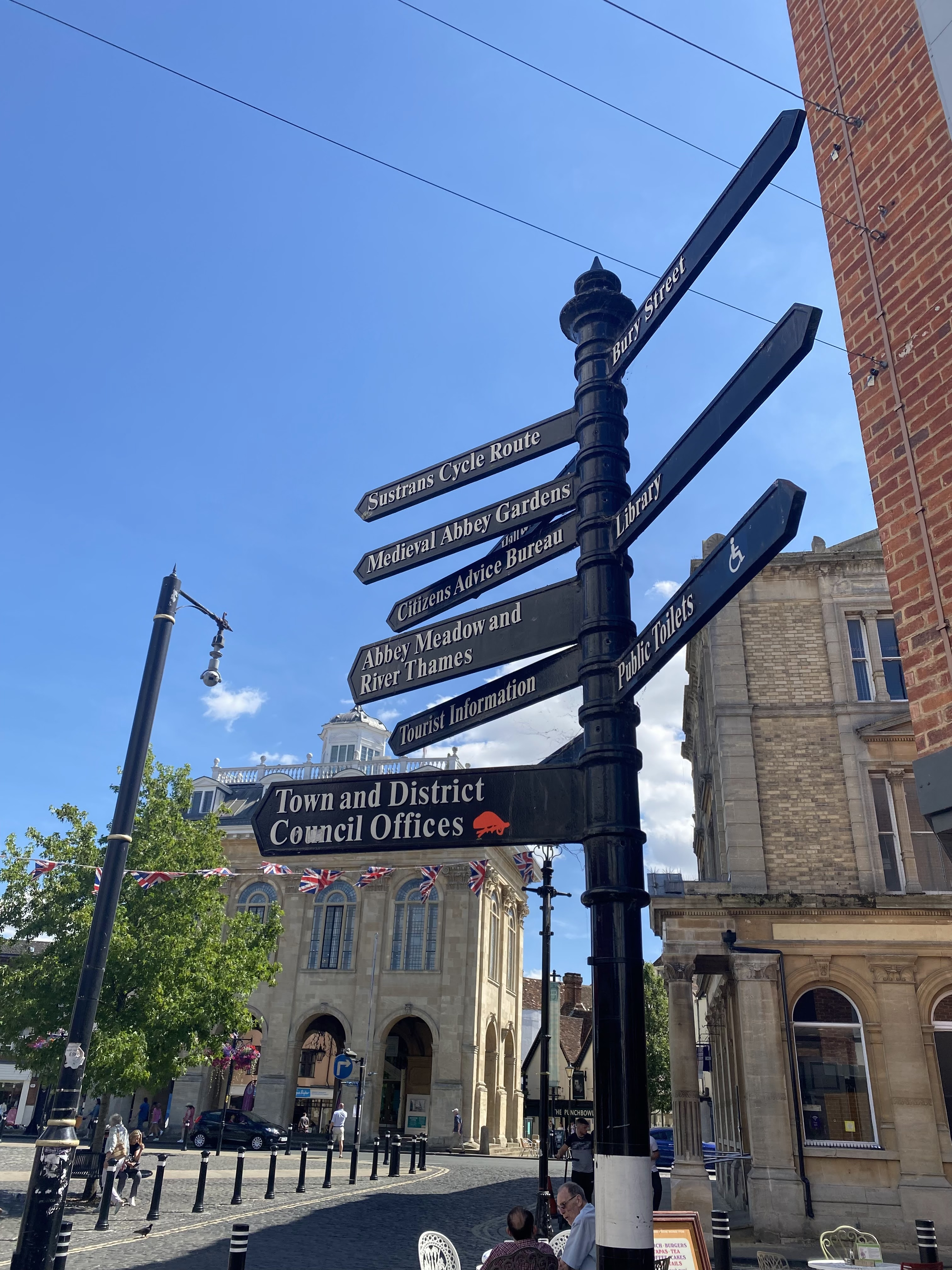
A sign in Abingdon-on-Thames' town centre showing directions to nearby locations

Abingdon is 6 miles (10 km) south of Oxford, 12 mi (19 km) south-east of Witney and 19 mi (31 km) north of Newbury in the flat valley of the Thames on its west (right) bank, where the small river Ock flows in from the Vale of White Horse. It is on the A415 between Witney and Dorchester, adjacent to the A34 trunk road, linking it with the M4 and M40 motorways. The B4017 and A4183 also link the town, both being part of the old A34 and often heavily congested. Local bus services to Oxford and the surrounding areas are run by the Oxford Bus Company, its sister company Thames Travel and smaller independent companies.

Abingdon no longer has a rail service. However, in recent years, urban expansion has brought Radley railway station close to the town's northeastern limits. The small, primarily stopping-service, railway stations at Culham and Radley are both just over two miles (3.2 km) from the town centre. Abingdon's eastern ring-road and newest suburbs are connected by footpath and cycleway from Radley.

Culham station was called "Abingdon Road" when it first opened in 1844, being the nearest station to the town at that time. It was renamed "Culham" when the Abingdon Railway branch line to Abingdon railway station was opened in 1856. That branch line initially connected to the main line at Abingdon Junction, before being extended to Radley station when that opened in 1873. The branch line from Radley to Abingdon closed to passengers in 1963. The nearest major stations with taxi ranks are Oxford (6 miles/9.7 km) and Didcot Parkway (8 miles/13 km). All are managed by Great Western Railway. Frequent express buses operate between the local railway stations and Abingdon, run by Oxford Bus Company and its sister company Thames Travel.

== Governance ==
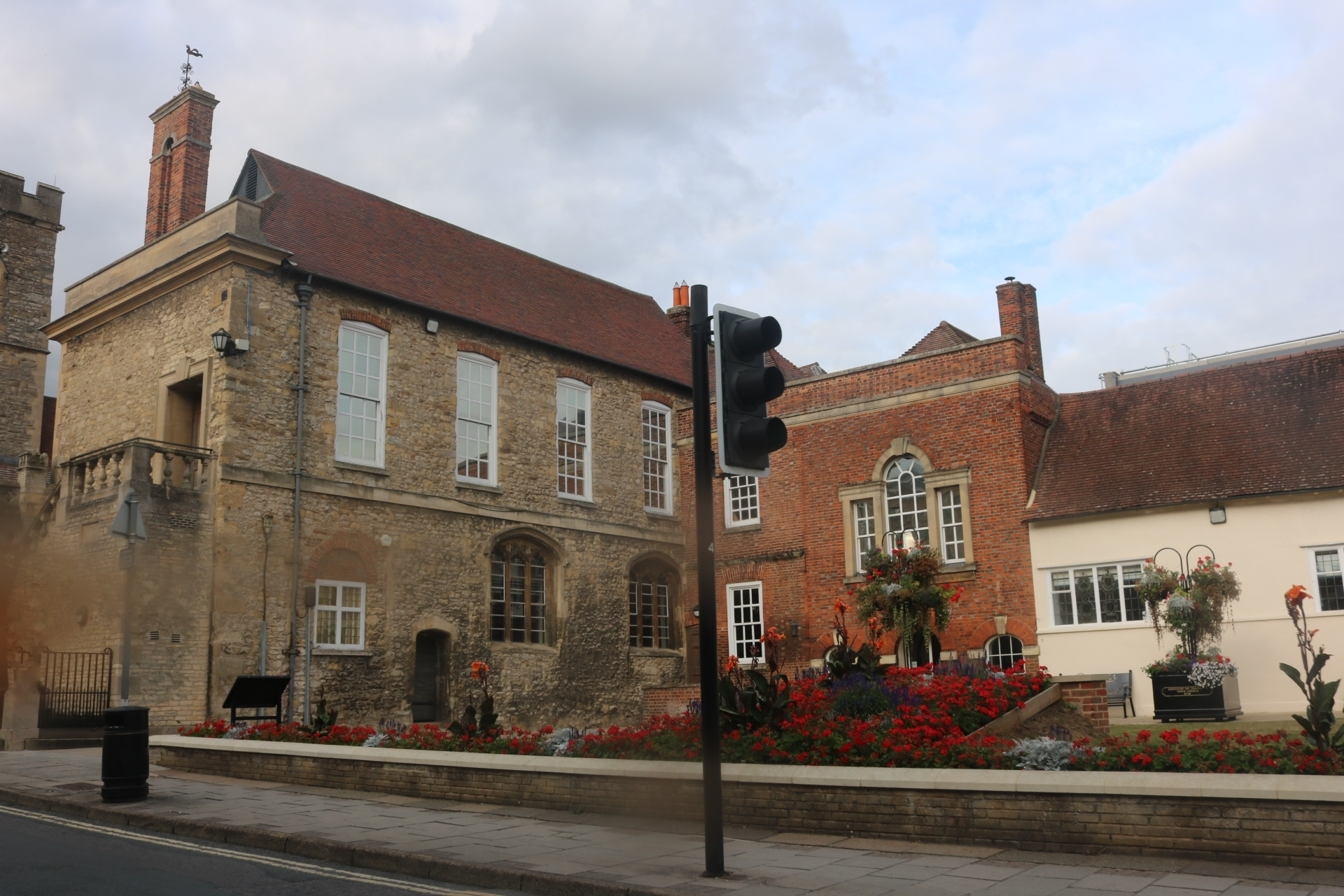
The Guildhall: Meeting place of the town council

There are three tiers of local government covering Abingdon, at parish (town), district and county level: Abingdon-on-Thames Town Council, Vale of White Horse District Council, and Oxfordshire County Council. The town council meets at the Guildhall on Bridge Street and has its offices in the adjoining Roysse Court. Parts of the Guildhall date back to the 15th century, having been originally part of the Abbey complex.

Abingdon-on-Thames Town Council's current composition following the 2023 local elections.

Control of the town council has passed between the Liberal Democrats and Conservatives in recent years. Elections take place every four years. Following the 2023 local elections, the political composition of the council was:

Party	Councillors
Liberal Democrats	18
Green	1
Total	19

The incumbent member of parliament for Oxford West and Abingdon is Layla Moran (Liberal Democrat).

=== Administrative history ===
Abingdon was first incorporated as a borough in 1556. The borough covered parts of the parishes of St Helen and St Nicolas; both parishes also included rural areas beyond the borough boundary. The borough was reformed to become a municipal borough in 1836 under the Municipal Corporations Act 1835, which standardised how most boroughs operated across the country.

The Local Government Act 1894 directed that parishes were no longer allowed to straddle borough boundaries, and so a parish called Abingdon was created covering the same area as the borough, and the parts of the parishes of St Helen and St Nicolas outside the borough boundary were combined into a separate parish called St. Helen Without.

The municipal borough was abolished in 1974 under the Local Government Act 1972, which also transferred the town from Berkshire to Oxfordshire. District-level functions passed to the Vale of White Horse District Council. A successor parish covering the area of the former borough was created called Abingdon, with its council taking the name Abingdon Town Council. The parish was formally renamed to Abingdon-on-Thames in 2012.

== Places of interest ==
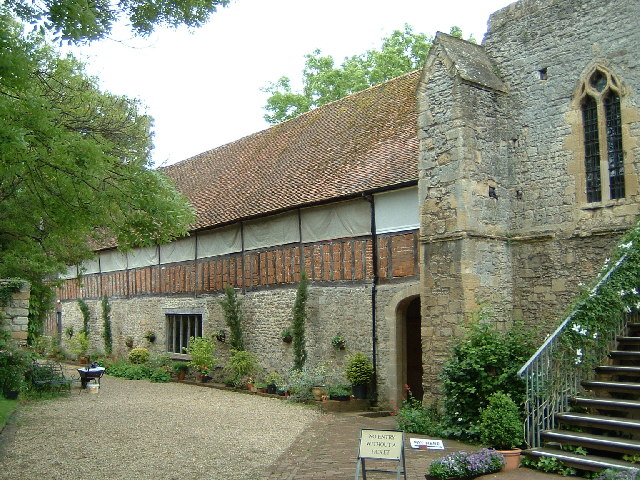
The Long Gallery at Abingdon Abbey

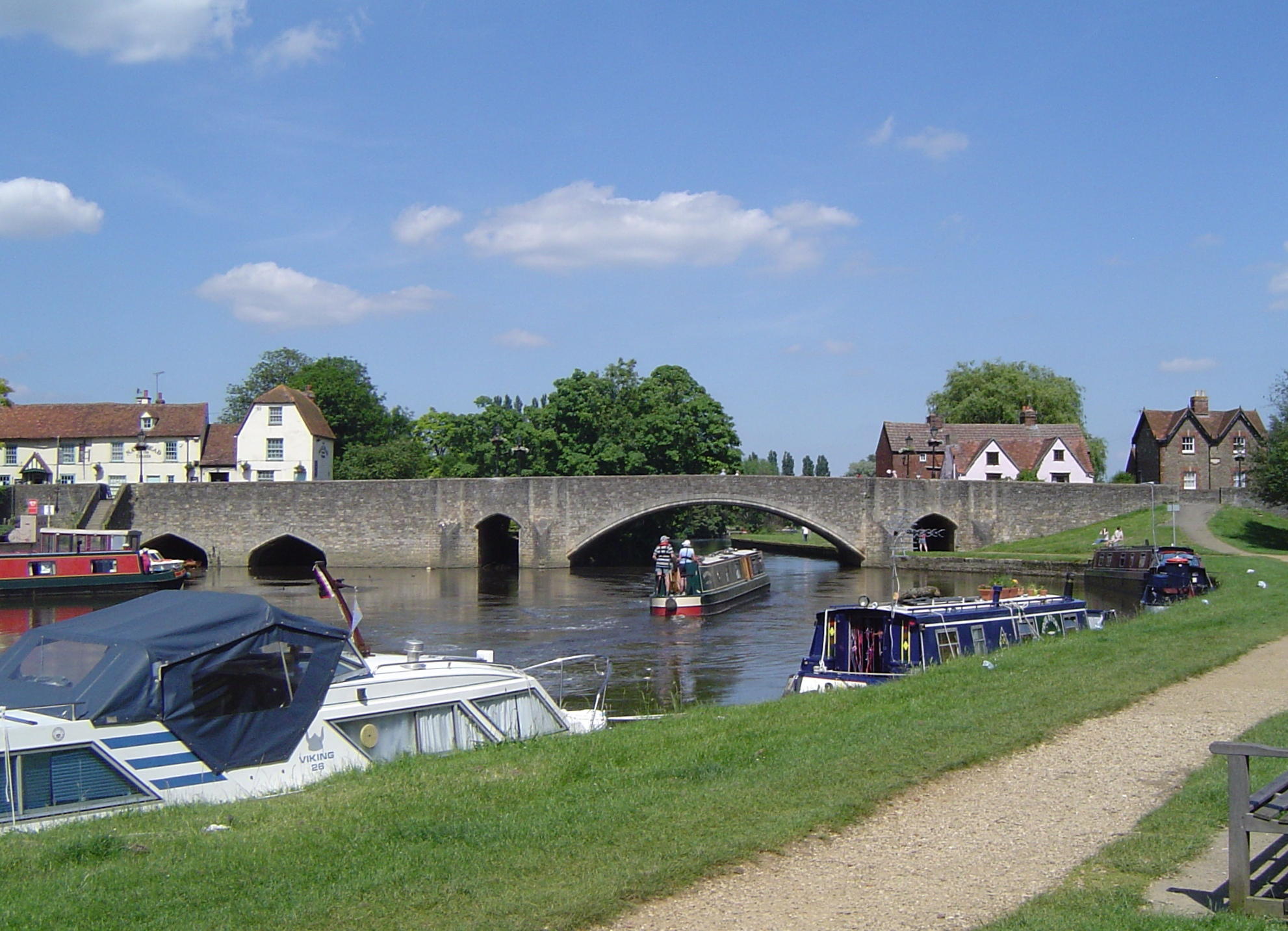
Abingdon Bridge spans the River Thames. It was built in 1416 and much altered in the 18th, 19th and 20th centuries.

Of the Benedictine Abingdon Abbey there remains a Perpendicular gateway and ruins of the mainly Early English prior's house, the guest house and other fragments. Other remains from the former abbey include the Unicorn Theatre and the Long Gallery, which are still used for plays and functions including an annual craft fair. St. Nicolas' Church, parts of which were built in 1180, is near the museum. Abingdon Bridge over the Thames, near St Helen's Church, was built in 1416 and was widened or altered in 1790, 1828, 1927 and 1929. Abbey Gateway between the Abingdon County Hall Museum and the Guildhall remains a point of local importance.

Abingdon has the remains of FitzHarris Castle, a motte-and-bailey, which can be found to the north of the town centre surrounded by trees within a housing estate. Originally built of wood or stone, it was a fortification on a raised earthwork called a motte surrounded by a protective ditch. There is a Second World War FW3/28A pillbox by the River Ock near Marcham Road. A prison, built by prisoners of the Napoleonic Wars in 1811, is on the south edge of town next to the Thames. In the 1970s the prison was converted into a leisure centre. In 2011 the site was developed into residential and commercial premises. According to local legend, prior to its conversion in the 1970s, the prison was haunted by the ghost of an eight-year-old boy who, after being convicted for arson in the mid-19th century, became the youngest person in the UK to be executed by hanging.

The Roysse Room was the site of Abingdon School (then 'Roysse's School') from 1563 until it moved to its current site after an indenture by John Roysse, who had been born and educated in Abingdon before he moved to London. The room is now part of the civic offices. St. Helen's Church dates from around 1100 and is the second-widest church in England, having five aisles and being 10 feet (3 m) wider than it is long. The tower of St Helen's Church has a modern ring of ten bells, cast by the Whitechapel Bell Foundry in 2005 and hung in a new frame with new fittings by White's of Appleton in 2006. Abingdon's county hall by the main market square, built in 1677–1680 reputedly by Christopher Kempster, stands on columns, leaving the ground floor open for a market and other functions. It was once hailed by Nikolaus Pevsner with the comment "Of the free-standing town halls of England with open ground floors this is the grandest". It now houses the Abingdon County Hall Museum and is run by Historic England.

== Culture and folklore ==
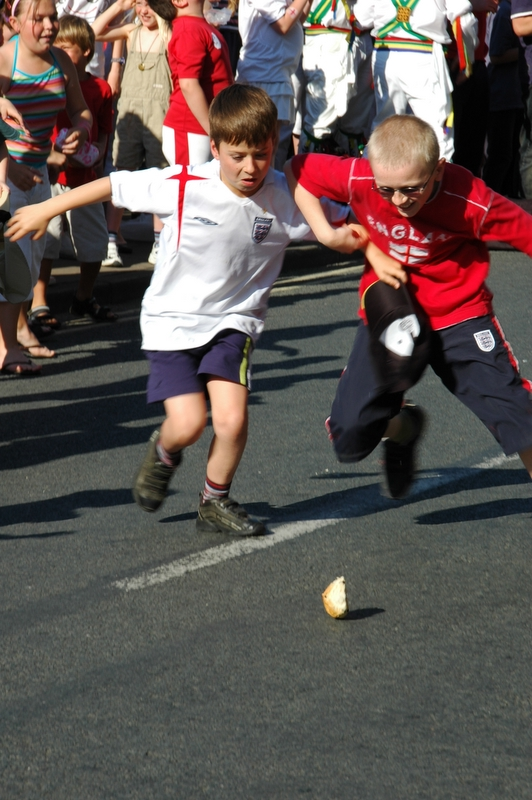
Children running for a bun in 2006

Bun-throwing is an Abingdon tradition that began with the 1761 Coronation of King George III. This longstanding tradition of the town has local dignitaries throwing buns (5,000 buns in 2018) from the roof of the Abingdon County Hall Museum into crowds assembled in the market square below on specific days of celebration (such as royal marriages, coronations and jubilees). The museum has a collection of the buns, dried and varnished, dating back to bun-throwings of the 19th century. To date there have been 35 bun-throwing events. Since 2000, there have been bun-throwing ceremonies to commemorate the Millennium, the Golden Jubilee of Queen Elizabeth II in 2002, the 450th anniversary of the town's being granted a royal charter in 2006, the Royal Wedding of Prince William and Catherine Middleton in 2011, the Diamond Jubilee of Elizabeth II in 2012, the centenary of the end of the World War I in November 2018 and the Platinum Jubilee of Elizabeth II in 2022.

Every October, the Abingdon Michaelmas Fair is held. Extending to the length of a mile, the fair is thought to be the longest and oldest street fair in Europe. It runs through the Market Place, High Street, and Ock Street. The fair was originally a hiring fair, designed to allow farmworkers from rural areas to find work in the town following the Black Death in 1348/9. The fair, previously run on the first Monday and Tuesday before 11 October each year, had its dates extended in 2024 to also run one day earlier, from the Sunday to the Tuesday. The much smaller Runaway Fair is run the Monday following the Michaelmas Fair, and was traditionally for workers who were unsatisfied with their employment after the first week, and sought to "run away" and return to the town to find better job opportunities. Abingdon has a very old and still active Morris dancing tradition, passed on since before the folk dance and song revivals in the 19th century. Every year a mayor of Ock Street is elected by the inhabitants of Ock Street; he then parades through the town preceded by the famous Horns of Ock Street, a symbol of Abingdon's Morris Dance troupe.

The Friends of Abingdon's Unicorn Theatre, housed in the old Abbey buildings, is the site of first productions of many stage adaptations of Terry Pratchett's Discworld novels by Stephen Briggs. Old Speckled Hen ale was originally brewed by Morland's of Abingdon to commemorate the MG factory in the town. It continues to be brewed by Greene King along with several complementary beers. The rock band Radiohead formed at Abingdon School in 1985.

== Abingdonians ==
See also Abbot of Abingdon, Abingdon School and List of Old Abingdonians.

- Ælfric of Abingdon, 10th-century Archbishop of Canterbury
- Alexander of Abingdon, late 13th-century/early-14th-century sculptor
- Sammy Chung, British former football manager
- John Creemer Clarke (1821–95), clothing manufacturer (Hyde and Clarke), JP, MP, benefactor
- Oswald Couldrey (1882–1958), British artist, poet and author, attended Abingdon School
- Gerald Charles Dickens, actor and great-great-grandson of Charles Dickens, lives in Abingdon
- Kate Edger was born in Abingdon and became the first NZ woman graduate
- Saint Edmund of Abingdon, 13th-century Archbishop of Canterbury, was born in Abingdon, as were his sisters, Saint Alice of Catesby and the Blessed Margaret Rich
- Kate Garraway, former GMTV and now Daybreak presenter, born in Abingdon and attended Fitzharrys school
- Michelle Goodman, Pilot and First Female Pilot to receive the DFC (b. 1976), lives in Abingdon.
- Tom Hingley, lead singer of Oldham band Inspiral Carpets
- David Jessel, BBC foreign correspondent and justice campaigner, born in Abingdon
- Francis Maude, Conservative Party MP, born in Abingdon and attended Abingdon School
- Paul Mayhew-Archer, comedy writer and actor. Taught drama at John Mason School and co-wrote The Vicar of Dibley; currently lives in Abingdon
- Alain Menu, World Touring Car Championship driver, lives in Abingdon
- David Mitchell, actor and comedian, attended Abingdon School
- Tom Penny, professional skateboarder: skateboards for Flip Skateboards and attended Fitzharrys School
- Radiohead, the rock band, formed as students at Abingdon School
- Dorothy Richardson, novelist, born in Abingdon. She was the first writer to publish an English-language novel using what was to become known as the stream-of-consciousness technique.
- John Spiers, melodeon player best known as a member of the band Bellowhead which broke up in 2016
- Stephen of Abingdon, 14th-century Lord Mayor of the City of London
- Matthew Taylor, footballer, grew up in the town and attended John Mason School
- Thomas Tesdale, 16th-century local benefactor and eventual founder of Pembroke College, Oxford
- Sir Henry Tombs (1825–74), a recipient of the Victoria Cross, attended Abingdon School
- Oliver Tompsett, West End star, best known for appearing as Fiyero in the musical Wicked at the Apollo Victoria Theatre in London
- Dean Whitehead, footballer, was born in Abingdon
- Kit Young, actor from Abingdon, attended Abingdon School

== Education ==
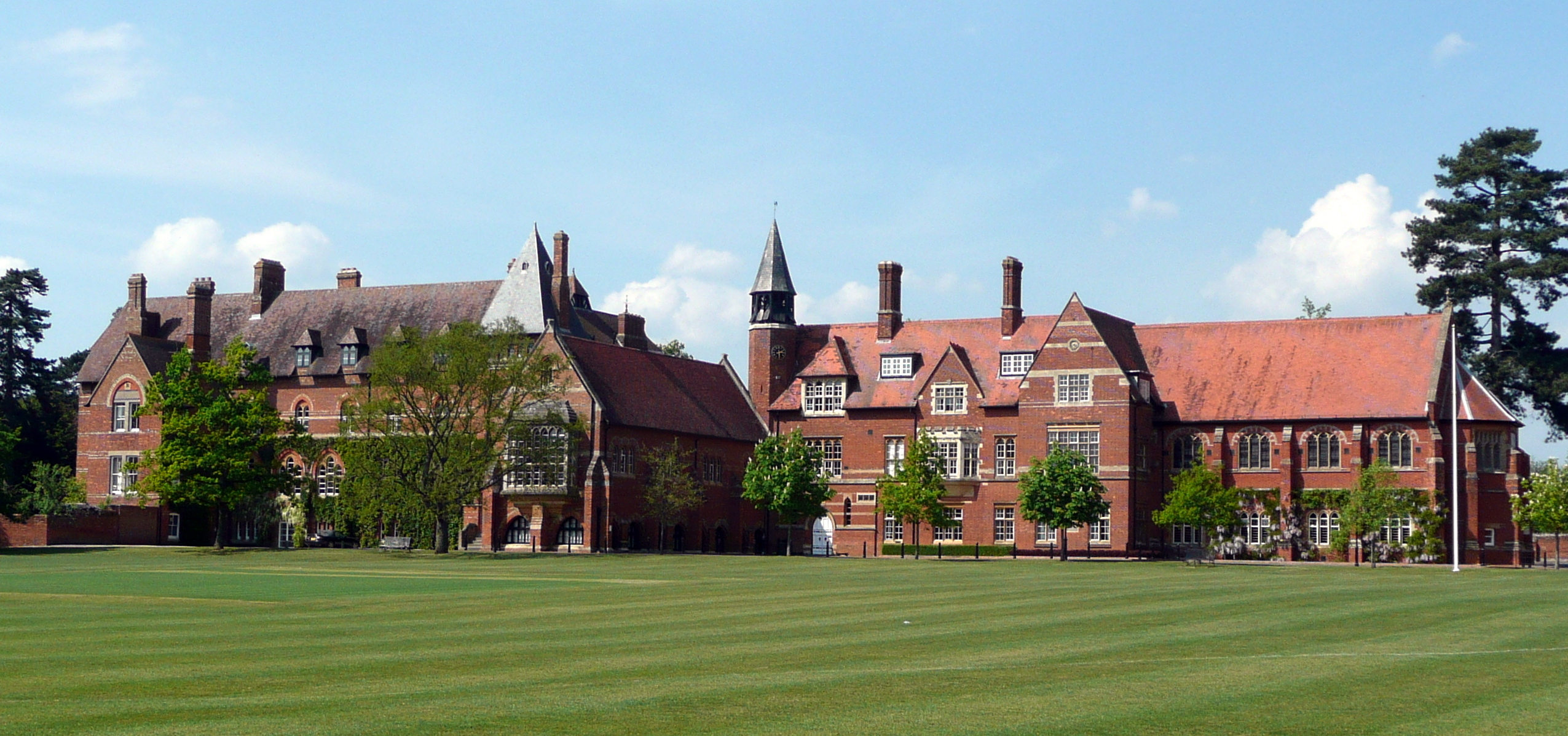
Abingdon School

- Abingdon and Witney College: provides further education.
- Abingdon School: independent, 11–18 and Abingdon Preparatory School 4–13, forming the Abingdon Foundation).
- The Consortium: local authority, mixed, a partnership of schools including Abingdon and Witney College and the following secondary schools:
  - Fitzharrys School
  - Larkmead School
  - John Mason School
  - Europa School, UK which replaced European School, Culham.
  - Our Lady's Abingdon: private, mixed, 3–18. Closed as of August 2025.
  - School of St Helen and St Katharine: private, girls, 9–18.

== International relations ==
Abingdon is twinned with:

- Argentan, France
- Sint-Niklaas, Belgium
- Schongau, Germany
- Lucca, Italy

== Freedom of the Town ==
The following people and military units have received the Freedom of the Town of Abingdon-on-Thames.

=== Military Units ===
- RAF Abingdon: 1955.
- 12 Regiment, RLC: 8 December 2010.

== See also ==
- Abingdon Monks' Map
- The Abingdon Sword
- Albert Park, Abingdon
- Our Lady and St Edmund's Church, Abingdon
