= List of civil parishes in Oxfordshire =

This is a list of civil parishes in the ceremonial county of Oxfordshire, England. There are 322 civil parishes.

Part of the former Oxford County Borough is unparished. Population figures are unavailable for some of the smallest parishes.

Civil Parish	Civil Parish Population 2011	Area (km^{2}) 2011	Pre 1974 District	District
Abingdon on Thames (town)	33,130	9.10	Abingdon Municipal Borough	Vale of White Horse
Adderbury	2,819	13.01	Banbury Rural District	Cherwell
Adwell			Bullingdon Rural District	South Oxfordshire
Alvescot	472	7.68	Witney Rural District	West Oxfordshire
Ambrosden	2,248	7.26	Ploughley Rural District	Cherwell
Appleford-on-Thames	350	2.97	Abingdon Rural District	Vale of White Horse
Appleton-with-Eaton	915	8.38	Abingdon Rural District	Vale of White Horse
Ardington	301	10.89	Wantage Rural District	Vale of White Horse
Ardley	751	8.79	Ploughley Rural District	Cherwell
Arncott	1,738	6.89	Ploughley Rural District	Cherwell
Ascott-under-Wychwood	560	7.08	Chipping Norton Rural District	West Oxfordshire
Ashbury	506	22.47	Faringdon Rural District	Vale of White Horse
Asthall	252	9.34	Witney Rural District	West Oxfordshire
Aston Rowant	793	11.82	Bullingdon Rural District	South Oxfordshire
Aston Tirrold	373	7.69	Wallingford Rural District	South Oxfordshire
Aston Upthorpe	179	4.74	Wallingford Rural District	South Oxfordshire
Aston, Cote, Shifford and Chimney			Witney Rural District	West Oxfordshire
Bampton	2,564	18.30	Witney Rural District	West Oxfordshire
Banbury (town)	46,853	21.06	Banbury Municipal Borough	Cherwell
Barford St. John and St. Michael	549	7.49	Banbury Rural District	Cherwell
Baulking	107	6.38	Faringdon Rural District	Vale of White Horse
Beckley and Stowood	608	9.17	Bullingdon Rural District	South Oxfordshire
Begbroke	783	2.87	Ploughley Rural District	Cherwell
Benson	4,754	9.84	Bullingdon Rural District	South Oxfordshire
Berinsfield	2,806	3.72	Bullingdon Rural District	South Oxfordshire
Berrick Salome	326	2.95	Bullingdon Rural District	South Oxfordshire
Besselsleigh			Abingdon Rural District	Vale of White Horse
Bicester (town)	30,854	8.58	Bicester Urban District	Cherwell
Binfield Heath	709	6.13	Henley Rural District	South Oxfordshire
Bix and Assendon	599	9.79	Henley Rural District	South Oxfordshire
Black Bourton	266	5.87	Witney Rural District	West Oxfordshire
Blackbird Leys	13,068	2.23	Oxford County Borough	Oxford
Blackthorn	317	7.77	Ploughley Rural District	Cherwell
Bladon	898	13.03	Witney Rural District	West Oxfordshire
Blenheim			Chipping Norton Rural District	West Oxfordshire
Bletchingdon	910	10.75	Ploughley Rural District	Cherwell
Blewbury	1,581	17.17	Wantage Rural District	Vale of White Horse
Bloxham	3,374	12.72	Banbury Rural District	Cherwell
Bodicote	2,126	4.33	Banbury Rural District	Cherwell
Bourton	614	6.98	Banbury Rural District	Cherwell
Bourton	326	5.51	Faringdon Rural District	Vale of White Horse
Brightwell Baldwin	208	6.52	Bullingdon Rural District	South Oxfordshire
Brightwell-cum-Sotwell	1,538	13.17	Wallingford Rural District	South Oxfordshire
Britwell Salome	204	5.78	Bullingdon Rural District	South Oxfordshire
Brize Norton	938	12.25	Witney Rural District	West Oxfordshire
Broadwell	218	17.34	Witney Rural District	West Oxfordshire
Broughton	286	3.94	Banbury Rural District	Cherwell
Bruern			Chipping Norton Rural District	West Oxfordshire
Buckland	588	18.22	Faringdon Rural District	Vale of White Horse
Bucknell	260	8.50	Ploughley Rural District	Cherwell
Burford (town)	1,410	20.00	Witney Rural District	West Oxfordshire
Buscot	173	11.58	Faringdon Rural District	Vale of White Horse
Carterton (town)	15,769	4.72	Witney Rural District	West Oxfordshire
Cassington	750	9.28	Witney Rural District	West Oxfordshire
Caversfield	1,788	4.52	Ploughley Rural District	Cherwell
Chadlington	827	13.95	Chipping Norton Rural District	West Oxfordshire
Chalgrove	2,830	11.16	Bullingdon Rural District	South Oxfordshire
Charlbury (town)	2,830	11.05	Chipping Norton Rural District	West Oxfordshire
Charlton on Otmoor	449	3.31	Ploughley Rural District	Cherwell
Charney Bassett	314	9.09	Faringdon Rural District	Vale of White Horse
Chastleton	153	10.57	Chipping Norton Rural District	West Oxfordshire
Checkendon	493	9.84	Henley Rural District	South Oxfordshire
Chesterton	850	13.19	Ploughley Rural District	Cherwell
Childrey	582	11.86	Wantage Rural District	Vale of White Horse
Chilson	141	17.72	Chipping Norton Rural District	West Oxfordshire
Chilton	894	5.87	Wantage Rural District	Vale of White Horse
Chinnor	5,924	13.83	Bullingdon Rural District	South Oxfordshire
Chipping Norton (town)	6,337	9.62	Chipping Norton Municipal Borough	West Oxfordshire
Cholsey	3,457	16.53	Wallingford Rural District	South Oxfordshire
Churchill	665	17.28	Chipping Norton Rural District	West Oxfordshire
Clanfield	879	7.27	Witney Rural District	West Oxfordshire
Claydon with Clattercot	306	6.22	Banbury Rural District	Cherwell
Clifton Hampden	662	7.78	Bullingdon Rural District	South Oxfordshire
Coleshill	156	8.23	Faringdon Rural District	Vale of White Horse
Combe	768	6.41	Chipping Norton Rural District	West Oxfordshire
Compton Beauchamp			Faringdon Rural District	Vale of White Horse
Cornbury and Wychwood			Chipping Norton Rural District	West Oxfordshire
Cornwell			Chipping Norton Rural District	West Oxfordshire
Cottisford	216	11.73	Ploughley Rural District	Cherwell
Crawley	155	4.63	Witney Rural District	West Oxfordshire
Cropredy	717	9.42	Banbury Rural District	Cherwell
Crowell			Bullingdon Rural District	South Oxfordshire
Crowmarsh	1,569	12.02	Henley Rural District	South Oxfordshire
Cuddesdon and Denton	511	7.34	Bullingdon Rural District	South Oxfordshire
Culham	453	8.29	Bullingdon Rural District	South Oxfordshire
Cumnor	5,755	21.95	Abingdon Rural District	Vale of White Horse
Curbridge	529	12.97	Witney Rural District	West Oxfordshire
Cuxham with Easington	135	3.18	Bullingdon Rural District	South Oxfordshire
Deddington	2,146	17.23	Banbury Rural District	Cherwell
Denchworth	171	4.20	Wantage Rural District	Vale of White Horse
Didcot (town)	24,416	8.49	Wallingford Rural District	South Oxfordshire
Dorchester	1,041	4.18	Bullingdon Rural District	South Oxfordshire
Drayton St Leonard	267	5.27	Bullingdon Rural District	South Oxfordshire
Drayton	242	3.11	Banbury Rural District	Cherwell
Drayton	2,353	10.70	Abingdon Rural District	Vale of White Horse
Ducklington	1,581	7.90	Witney Rural District	West Oxfordshire
Duns Tew	478	7.08	Banbury Rural District	Cherwell
East Challow	769	6.35	Wantage Rural District	Vale of White Horse
East Hagbourne	1,882	3.90	Wallingford Rural District	South Oxfordshire
East Hanney	748	8.89	Wantage Rural District	Vale of White Horse
East Hendred	1,116	12.94	Wantage Rural District	Vale of White Horse
Eaton Hastings			Faringdon Rural District	Vale of White Horse
Elsfield	191	9.53	Bullingdon Rural District	South Oxfordshire
Enstone	1,139	23.99	Chipping Norton Rural District	West Oxfordshire
Epwell	285	4.63	Banbury Rural District	Cherwell
Ewelme	1,048	11.50	Bullingdon Rural District	South Oxfordshire
Eye and Dunsden	366	10.39	Henley Rural District	South Oxfordshire
Eynsham	4,648	14.58	Witney Rural District	West Oxfordshire
Fawler			Chipping Norton Rural District	West Oxfordshire
Fencott and Murcott	285	13.49	Ploughley Rural District	Cherwell
Fernham	244	4.11	Faringdon Rural District	Vale of White Horse
Fifield	240	12.26	Chipping Norton Rural District	West Oxfordshire
Filkins and Broughton Poggs	434	10.88	Witney Rural District	West Oxfordshire
Finmere	466	6.35	Ploughley Rural District	Cherwell
Finstock	797	8.77	Chipping Norton Rural District	West Oxfordshire
Forest Hill with Shotover	856	7.57	Bullingdon Rural District	South Oxfordshire
Freeland	1,560	4.24	Witney Rural District	West Oxfordshire
Frilford	235	4.64	Abingdon Rural District	Vale of White Horse
Fringford	602	5.89	Ploughley Rural District	Cherwell
Fritwell	736	4.99	Ploughley Rural District	Cherwell
Fulbrook	437	6.94	Witney Rural District	West Oxfordshire
Fyfield and Tubney	489	11.10	Abingdon Rural District	Vale of White Horse
Garford	229	7.46	Abingdon Rural District	Vale of White Horse
Garsington	1,689	8.42	Bullingdon Rural District	South Oxfordshire
Glympton			Chipping Norton Rural District	West Oxfordshire
Godington			Ploughley Rural District	Cherwell
Goosey	135	3.92	Wantage Rural District	Vale of White Horse
Goring Heath	1,227	11.44	Henley Rural District	South Oxfordshire
Goring-on-Thames	3,187	9.62	Henley Rural District	South Oxfordshire
Gosford and Water Eaton	1,323	8.74	Ploughley Rural District	Cherwell
Grafton and Radcot			Witney Rural District	West Oxfordshire
Great Coxwell	365	13.02	Faringdon Rural District	Vale of White Horse
Great Faringdon (town)	7,121	14.31	Faringdon Rural District	Vale of White Horse
Great Haseley	511	17.61	Bullingdon Rural District	South Oxfordshire
Great Milton	790	10.42	Bullingdon Rural District	South Oxfordshire
Great Tew	156	12.17	Chipping Norton Rural District	West Oxfordshire
Grove	7,178	9.97	Wantage Rural District	Vale of White Horse
Hailey	1,208	10.30	Witney Rural District	West Oxfordshire
Hampton Gay and Poyle	141	6.11	Ploughley Rural District	Cherwell
Hanborough	2,630	8.56	Witney Rural District	West Oxfordshire
Hanwell	263	4.30	Banbury Rural District	Cherwell
Hardwick with Tusmore			Ploughley Rural District	Cherwell
Hardwick-with-Yelford			Witney Rural District	West Oxfordshire
Harpsden	560	8.77	Henley Rural District	South Oxfordshire
Harwell	2,349	10.12	Wantage Rural District	Vale of White Horse
Hatford	164	10.69	Faringdon Rural District	Vale of White Horse
Henley-on-Thames (town)	11,619	5.58	Henley on Thames Municipal Borough	South Oxfordshire
Hethe	275	5.75	Ploughley Rural District	Cherwell
Heyford Park			Ploughley Rural District	Cherwell
Heythrop			Chipping Norton Rural District	West Oxfordshire
Highmoor	276	5.20	Henley Rural District	South Oxfordshire
Hinton Waldrist	328	8.13	Faringdon Rural District	Vale of White Horse
Holton	639	6.63	Bullingdon Rural District	South Oxfordshire
Holwell			Chipping Norton Rural District	West Oxfordshire
Hook Norton	2,117	22.23	Banbury Rural District	Cherwell
Horley	336	4.68	Banbury Rural District	Cherwell
Hornton	328	5.90	Banbury Rural District	Cherwell
Horspath	1,378	4.66	Bullingdon Rural District	South Oxfordshire
Horton cum Studley	455	9.04	Ploughley Rural District	Cherwell
Idbury	124	6.33	Chipping Norton Rural District	West Oxfordshire
Ipsden	325	11.00	Henley Rural District	South Oxfordshire
Islip	652	6.43	Ploughley Rural District	Cherwell
Kelmscott	198	13.22	Witney Rural District	West Oxfordshire
Kencot	101	4.36	Witney Rural District	West Oxfordshire
Kennington	4,076	4.98	Abingdon Rural District	Vale of White Horse
Kiddington with Asterleigh	167	13.94	Chipping Norton Rural District	West Oxfordshire
Kidlington	13,723	9.12	Ploughley Rural District	Cherwell
Kidmore End	1,302	10.90	Henley Rural District	South Oxfordshire
Kingham	913	7.59	Chipping Norton Rural District	West Oxfordshire
Kingston Bagpuize with Southmoor	2,349	12.55	Abingdon Rural District	Vale of White Horse
Kingston Lisle	225	8.25	Faringdon Rural District	Vale of White Horse
Kirtlington	988	14.50	Ploughley Rural District	Cherwell
Langford	349	8.56	Witney Rural District	West Oxfordshire
Launton	1,204	10.50	Ploughley Rural District	Cherwell
Leafield	945	11.05	Chipping Norton Rural District	West Oxfordshire
Letcombe Bassett	148	6.60	Wantage Rural District	Vale of White Horse
Letcombe Regis	578	9.01	Wantage Rural District	Vale of White Horse
Lew			Witney Rural District	West Oxfordshire
Lewknor	663	13.13	Bullingdon Rural District	South Oxfordshire
Little Coxwell	144	2.73	Faringdon Rural District	Vale of White Horse
Little Faringdon			Witney Rural District	West Oxfordshire
Little Milton	486	5.45	Bullingdon Rural District	South Oxfordshire
Little Tew	253	16.45	Chipping Norton Rural District	West Oxfordshire
Little Wittenham	140	11.62	Wallingford Rural District	South Oxfordshire
Littlemore	5,646	1.90	Bullingdon Rural District	Oxford
Littleworth	239	9.55	Faringdon Rural District	Vale of White Horse
Lockinge	183	15.23	Wantage Rural District	Vale of White Horse
Long Wittenham	876	1.18	Wallingford Rural District	South Oxfordshire
Longcot	617	7.65	Faringdon Rural District	Vale of White Horse
Longworth	566	5.47	Faringdon Rural District	Vale of White Horse
Lower Heyford	492	7.14	Ploughley Rural District	Cherwell
Lyford			Abingdon Rural District	Vale of White Horse
Lyneham	153	7.86	Chipping Norton Rural District	West Oxfordshire
Mapledurham	317	11.32	Henley Rural District	South Oxfordshire
Marcham	1,905	10.18	Abingdon Rural District	Vale of White Horse
Marsh Baldon	310	5.17	Bullingdon Rural District	South Oxfordshire
Merton	424	7.07	Ploughley Rural District	Cherwell
Middle Aston			Banbury Rural District	Cherwell
Middleton Stoney	331	7.50	Ploughley Rural District	Cherwell
Milcombe	613	5.05	Banbury Rural District	Cherwell
Milton	192	3.28	Banbury Rural District	Cherwell
Milton	1,290	5.92	Abingdon Rural District	Vale of White Horse
Milton-under-Wychwood	1,648	8.41	Chipping Norton Rural District	West Oxfordshire
Minster Lovell	1,409	7.89	Witney Rural District	West Oxfordshire
Mixbury	370	15.38	Ploughley Rural District	Cherwell
Mollington	479	5.89	Banbury Rural District	Cherwell
Moulsford	601	7.24	Wallingford Rural District	South Oxfordshire
Nettlebed	727	6.13	Henley Rural District	South Oxfordshire
Newington	102	7.28	Bullingdon Rural District	South Oxfordshire
Newton Purcell with Shelswell			Ploughley Rural District	Cherwell
Noke	117	4.91	Ploughley Rural District	Cherwell
North Aston	316	8.83	Banbury Rural District	Cherwell
Botley and North Hinksey	4,535	2.96	Abingdon Rural District	Vale of White Horse
North Leigh	1,928	15.13	Witney Rural District	West Oxfordshire
North Moreton	328	4.45	Wallingford Rural District	South Oxfordshire
North Newington	324	4.47	Banbury Rural District	Cherwell
Northmoor	377	8.27	Witney Rural District	West Oxfordshire
Nuffield	939	12.91	Henley Rural District	South Oxfordshire
Nuneham Courtenay	200	8.57	Bullingdon Rural District	South Oxfordshire
Oddington	129	5.51	Ploughley Rural District	Cherwell
Old Marston	3,398	2.92	Bullingdon Rural District	Oxford
Over Norton	498	10.09	Chipping Norton Rural District	West Oxfordshire
Piddington	370	9.53	Ploughley Rural District	Cherwell
Pishill with Stonor	304	10.57	Henley Rural District	South Oxfordshire
Prescote			Banbury Rural District	Cherwell
Pusey			Faringdon Rural District	Vale of White Horse
Pyrton	227	13.31	Bullingdon Rural District	South Oxfordshire
Radley	2,835	10.70	Abingdon Rural District	Vale of White Horse
Ramsden	342	3.96	Witney Rural District	West Oxfordshire
Risinghurst and Sandhills	4,237	0.92	Bullingdon Rural District	Oxford
Rollright	502	12.30	Chipping Norton Rural District	West Oxfordshire
Rotherfield Greys	350	8.71	Henley Rural District	South Oxfordshire
Rotherfield Peppard	1,649	7.73	Henley Rural District	South Oxfordshire
Rousham			Chipping Norton Rural District	West Oxfordshire
Salford	356	6.31	Chipping Norton Rural District	West Oxfordshire
Sandford St Martin	209	9.26	Chipping Norton Rural District	West Oxfordshire
Sandford-on-Thames	1,213	3.78	Bullingdon Rural District	South Oxfordshire
Sarsden			Chipping Norton Rural District	West Oxfordshire
Shellingford	173	7.12	Faringdon Rural District	Vale of White Horse
Shenington with Alkerton	425	9.60	Banbury Rural District	Cherwell
Shilton	626	7.65	Witney Rural District	West Oxfordshire
Shiplake	1,954	4.43	Henley Rural District	South Oxfordshire
Shipton on Cherwell and Thrupp	493	6.04	Ploughley Rural District	Cherwell
Shipton-under-Wychwood	1,244	10.87	Chipping Norton Rural District	West Oxfordshire
Shirburn	214	17.68	Bullingdon Rural District	South Oxfordshire
Shrivenham	2,347	10.68	Faringdon Rural District	Vale of White Horse
Shutford	476	5.51	Banbury Rural District	Cherwell
Sibford Ferris	476	4.06	Banbury Rural District	Cherwell
Sibford Gower	508	7.09	Banbury Rural District	Cherwell
Somerton	305	8.00	Ploughley Rural District	Cherwell
Sonning Common	3,784	3.66	Henley Rural District	South Oxfordshire
Souldern	370	8.11	Ploughley Rural District	Cherwell
South Hinksey	393	3.43	Abingdon Rural District	Vale of White Horse
South Leigh and High Cogges	336	16.26	Witney Rural District	West Oxfordshire
South Moreton	420	5.46	Wallingford Rural District	South Oxfordshire
South Newington	285	5.86	Banbury Rural District	Cherwell
South Stoke	507	7.67	Henley Rural District	South Oxfordshire
Sparsholt	297	13.47	Wantage Rural District	Vale of White Horse
Spelsbury	305	18.63	Chipping Norton Rural District	West Oxfordshire
St Helen Without	3,165	11.54	Abingdon Rural District	Vale of White Horse
Stadhampton	832	9.80	Bullingdon Rural District	South Oxfordshire
Standlake	1,497	10.53	Witney Rural District	West Oxfordshire
Stanford in the Vale	2,093	5.15	Faringdon Rural District	Vale of White Horse
Stanton Harcourt	960	13.93	Witney Rural District	West Oxfordshire
Stanton St John	430	10.93	Bullingdon Rural District	South Oxfordshire
Steeple Aston	947	4.35	Banbury Rural District	Cherwell
Steeple Barton	1,523	11.76	Chipping Norton Rural District	West Oxfordshire
Steventon	1,485	9.70	Abingdon Rural District	Vale of White Horse
Stoke Lyne	218	13.02	Ploughley Rural District	Cherwell
Stoke Row	651	6.07	Henley Rural District	South Oxfordshire
Stoke Talmage			Bullingdon Rural District	South Oxfordshire
Stonesfield	1,527	5.13	Chipping Norton Rural District	West Oxfordshire
Stratton Audley	434	13.36	Ploughley Rural District	Cherwell
Sunningwell	904	4.95	Abingdon Rural District	Vale of White Horse
Sutton Courtenay	2,421	8.34	Abingdon Rural District	Vale of White Horse
Swalcliffe	254	6.79	Banbury Rural District	Cherwell
Swerford	132	4.54	Chipping Norton Rural District	West Oxfordshire
Swinbrook and Widford	139	9.37	Witney Rural District	West Oxfordshire
Swyncombe	250	14.39	Henley Rural District	South Oxfordshire
Sydenham	451	10.42	Bullingdon Rural District	South Oxfordshire
Tackley	998	16.10	Chipping Norton Rural District	West Oxfordshire
Tadmarton	541	8.38	Banbury Rural District	Cherwell
Taynton			Witney Rural District	West Oxfordshire
Tetsworth	693	10.60	Bullingdon Rural District	South Oxfordshire
Thame (town)	11,561	12.68	Thame Urban District	South Oxfordshire
Tiddington-with-Albury	683	4.40	Bullingdon Rural District	South Oxfordshire
Toot Baldon	148	4.48	Bullingdon Rural District	South Oxfordshire
Towersey	433	5.57	Bullingdon Rural District	South Oxfordshire
Uffington	783	11.85	Faringdon Rural District	Vale of White Horse
Upper Heyford	1,295	6.59	Ploughley Rural District	Cherwell
Upton	421	5.72	Wantage Rural District	Vale of White Horse
Wallingford (town)	7,542	3.09	Municipal Borough of Wallingford	South Oxfordshire
Wantage (town)	11,327	11.55	Wantage Urban District	Vale of White Horse
Warborough	987	6.95	Bullingdon Rural District	South Oxfordshire
Wardington	602	11.11	Banbury Rural District	Cherwell
Watchfield	1,702	6.15	Faringdon Rural District	Vale of White Horse
Waterperry with Thomley	257	13.76	Bullingdon Rural District	South Oxfordshire
Waterstock			Bullingdon Rural District	South Oxfordshire
Watlington	2,727	14.56	Bullingdon Rural District	South Oxfordshire
Wendlebury	421	4.65	Ploughley Rural District	Cherwell
West Challow	184	4.33	Wantage Rural District	Vale of White Horse
West Hagbourne	259	4.12	Wallingford Rural District	South Oxfordshire
West Hanney	490	5.39	Wantage Rural District	Vale of White Horse
West Hendred	386	8.11	Wantage Rural District	Vale of White Horse
Westcot Barton	244	9.77	Chipping Norton Rural District	West Oxfordshire
Weston-on-the-Green	523	10.06	Ploughley Rural District	Cherwell
Western Valley			Wantage Rural District	Vale of White Horse
Westwell			Witney Rural District	West Oxfordshire
Wheatfield			Bullingdon Rural District	South Oxfordshire
Wheatley	3,913	4.39	Bullingdon Rural District	South Oxfordshire
Whitchurch-on-Thames	824	5.37	Henley Rural District	South Oxfordshire
Wigginton	194	4.80	Banbury Rural District	Cherwell
Witney (town)	27,522	9.22	Witney Urban District	West Oxfordshire
Woodcote	2,604	7.11	Henley Rural District	South Oxfordshire
Woodeaton			Bullingdon Rural District	South Oxfordshire
Woodstock (town)	3,100	3.71	Woodstock Municipal Borough	West Oxfordshire
Woolstone	210	15.17	Faringdon Rural District	Vale of White Horse
Wootton	2,709	5.73	Abingdon Rural District	Vale of White Horse
Wootton	569	14.47	Chipping Norton Rural District	West Oxfordshire
Worton			Chipping Norton Rural District	West Oxfordshire
Wroxton	546	10.28	Banbury Rural District	Cherwell
Wytham	136	7.25	Abingdon Rural District	Vale of White Horse
Yarnton	2,545	7.12	Ploughley Rural District	Cherwell

== See also ==
- List of civil parishes in England
