= Greater Oxford =

- Future unitary authority area
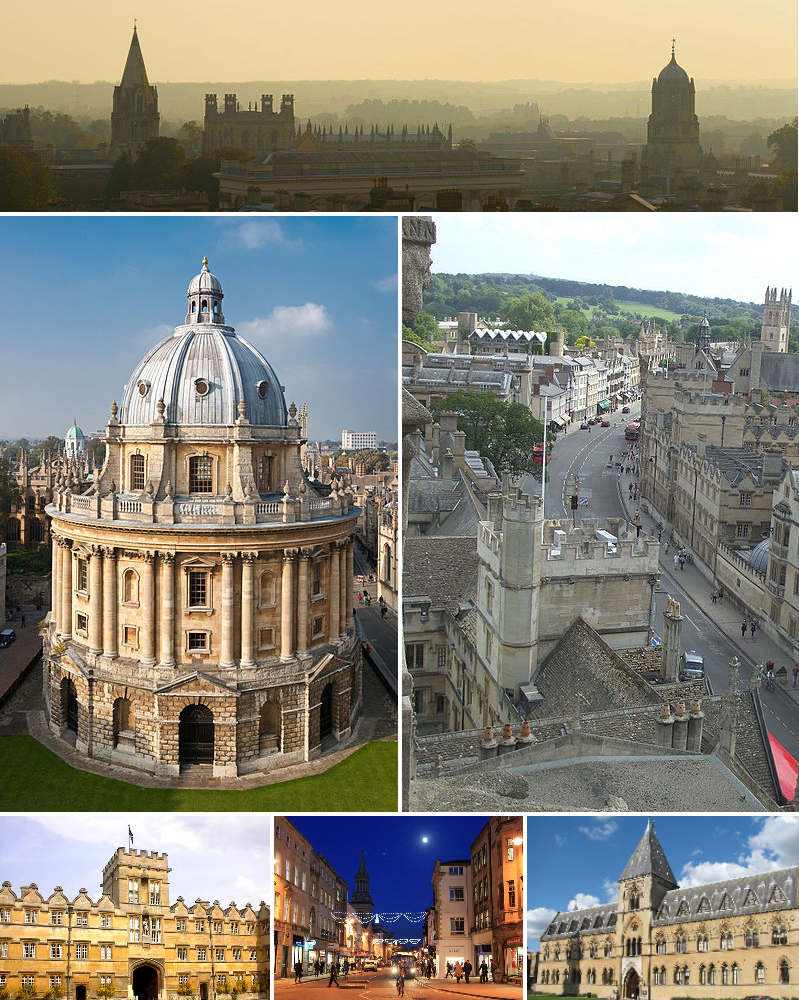
- Oxford

- Greater Oxford within Oxfordshire and Ridgeway
- Greater Oxford boundaries
- Coordinates: 51.7515°N 1.2571°W
- Sovereign state: United Kingdom
- Country: England
- Region: South East
- Ceremonial county: Oxfordshire
- Incorporated: Proposed for 2029

Government
  - Type: Unitary authority
  - Body: Greater Oxford Council

Population (2024 estimate)
  - Total: 241,000
- Time zone: UTC+0 (GMT)
  - Summer (DST): UTC+1 (BST)

Greater Oxford is expected to be a unitary authority area in the county of Oxfordshire, England. It was originally planned to be created in April 2028 as part of an ongoing local government review, with elections in May 2027. Plans to create it were halted in September 2026. In October 2026, plans were revived. Initially with a modified boundary taking in a smaller area, this was reversed in November 2026. It was announced that the first election is expected to take place in 2028 and the unitary authority will be established in 2029. The largest settlement will be the city of Oxford and it will encompass the entire urban area around the city. The population of the proposed area was estimated to be 241,000 in 2024.

== Formation ==
It was announced in July 2026 that Greater Oxford would be formed from Oxford district and 49 other parishes, 15 from Cherwell, 25 from South Oxfordshire and 9 from the Vale of White Horse. The remainder of the Cherwell district will form part of a new Northern Oxfordshire unitary, and the remainder of the South Oxfordshire and Vale of White Horse districts will join with West Berkshire to form a new Ridgeway unitary.

The district is being formed as part of ongoing local government changes throughout England, in which all areas of the country that have separate county councils and district councils will see those replaced with single-tier, or unitary, local governance. Alternative proposals for a single unitary area for Oxfordshire (leaving West Berkshire unchanged), or for creating two unitaries in Oxfordshire and West Berkshire, were not accepted.

Decisions were announced in July 2026, with elections planned for May 2027 and the new authorities established in 2028. In September 2026, the Oxfordshire proposals were halted by the government and placed under review. The first election in 2027 was cancelled. In October 2026, the plans were revived and modified. Eight South Oxfordshire parishes that were previously announced to go to Greater Oxford would now go to Ridgeway. (Note: The parishes of Nuneham Courtenay, Culham, Clifton Hampden, Marsh Baldon, Great Milton, Wheatley, Waterstock and Holton were proposed to form part of Ridgeway and not Greater Oxford.)

The first election expected to take place in 2028 and the new councils formally coming into existence in 2029. Also in October, Oxfordshire County Council initiated legal action against the decision. Oxfordshire County Council reacted to the revised proposal with a threat of further potential legal action. In November 2026, the government revised its modified proposal to include all 49 parishes from outside Oxford.

== Governance ==
It will be run by Greater Oxford Council, which is proposed to have 72 councillors.

== Geography ==
It is planned to be formed in 2029. The largest settlement will be the city of Oxford, and it will encompass the entire urban area around the city, including Botley, Kennington, Kidlington, and Sandford-on-Thames, and various outlying villages. The population of the area was estimated to be 241,000 in 2024.

== Parishes ==
The majority of Oxford is currently unparished, while the rest of the area is parished. As of November 2026, the parishes in the area are to be:

- From Oxford: Blackbird Leys, Littlemore, Old Marston and Risinghurst and Sandhills
- From Cherwell: Begbroke, Bletchingdon, Charlton-on-Otmoor, Fencott and Murcott, Gosford and Water Eaton, Hampton Gay and Poyle, Horton-cum-Studley, Islip, Kidlington, Noke, Oddington, Shipton-on-Cherwell and Thrupp, Wendlebury, Weston-on-the-Green, Yarnton
- From South Oxfordshire: Beckley and Stowood, Berinsfield, Clifton Hampden, Cuddesdon and Denton, Culham, Dorchester, Drayton St Leonard, Elsfield, Forest Hill with Shotover, Garsington, Great Milton, Holton, Horspath, Horton-cum-Studley, Little Milton, Marsh Baldon, Nuneham Courtenay, Sandford-on-Thames, Stadhampton, Stanton St John, Toot Baldon, Warborough, Waterperry with Thornley, Waterstock, Wheatley, Woodeaton
- From Vale of White Horse: Appleton-with-Eaton, Besselsleigh, Cumnor, Kennington, North Hinksey, South Hinksey, Sunningwell, Wootton, Wytham.
