= Abingdon Rural District =

Former local government area in Berkshire, England

Coordinates: 51.68°N 1.34°W

Map of boundary as of 1971

Abingdon was a rural district in the administrative county of Berkshire from 1894 to 1974.

It was formed under the Local Government Act 1894 based on that part of the Abingdon rural sanitary district which was in Berkshire (the Oxfordshire part forming Culham Rural District). It nearly surrounded, but did not include, the municipal borough of Abingdon, and in the north was close to Oxford.

The district was governed locally by the Abingdon Rural District Council which, in the 1960s, consisted of 35 members. The offices of the council were in Bath Street, Abingdon.

It was abolished in 1974 under the Local Government Act 1972, and merged with other districts to form the new Vale of White Horse, which was in the new non-metropolitan county of Oxfordshire.

== Civil parishes ==
The district contained the following civil parishes during its existence:

- Abingdon St. Helen Without
- Appleford
- Appleton-with-Eaton
- Bagley Wood (until 1900: absorbed by Radley CP)
- Besselsleigh
- Chandlings Farm (until 1900: absorbed by Radley CP)
- Cumnor
- Draycot Moor (until 1971: became part of Kingston Bagpuize with Southmoor CP)
- Drayton
- Frilford
- Fyfield (until 1952: merged with Tubney CP)
- Fyfield and Tubney (from 1952: merger of Fyfield, Tubney CPs)
- Garford
- Kennington (from 1936: formed from parts of South Hinksey and Radley)
- Kingston Bagpuize (until 1971: formed part of Kingston Bagpuize with Southmoor CP)
- Kingston Bagpuize with Southmoor (from 1971: merger of Kingston Bagpuize, Draycot Moor CPs)
- Lyford
- Marcham
- Milton
- North Hinksey
- Radley
- Seacourt (until 1900: absorbed by Wytham CP)
- South Hinksey
- Steventon
- Sunningwell
- Sutton Courtenay
- Sutton Wick (until 1934: abolished with areas going to Abingdon MB, Drayton, Sutton Courtenay CPs)
- Tubney (until 1952: merged with Fyfield CP)
- Wootton
- Wytham
