= Faringdon Rural District =

Former local government area in the UK

Coordinates: 51.63°N 1.59°W

Map of boundary as of 1971

Faringdon was a rural district in the administrative county of Berkshire from 1894 to 1974.

It was formed under the Local Government Act 1894 based on that part of the Faringdon rural sanitary district which was in Berkshire; however, it also included for a time Lechlade, a small market town in Gloucestershire. It was situated in the northwest region of historic Berkshire, but the area was transferred to Oxfordshire in 1974 and is now in the southwestern region of that county. The Faringdon rural district bordered Gloucestershire to the northwest, Wiltshire to the west and Oxfordshire and the River Thames to the north.

It was abolished in 1974 under the Local Government Act 1972, and merged with other districts to form the new Vale of White Horse, which was in the new non-metropolitan county of Oxfordshire.

== Civil parishes ==
The district contained the following civil parishes during its existence:

- Ashbury
- Baulking
- Bourton
- Buckland
- Buscot
- Charney Bassett
- Coleshill
- Compton Beauchamp
- Eaton Hastings
- Fernham
- Great Coxwell
- Great Faringdon
- Hatford
- Hinton Waldrist
- Kingston Lisle
- Lechlade
- Little Coxwell
- Littleworth
- Longcot
- Longworth
- Pusey
- Shellingford
- Shrivenham
- Stanford in the Vale
- Uffington
- Watchfield
- Woolstone
