= Culham Rural District =

Rural district in Oxfordshire, England

Coordinates: 51.675°N 1.190°W

Culham
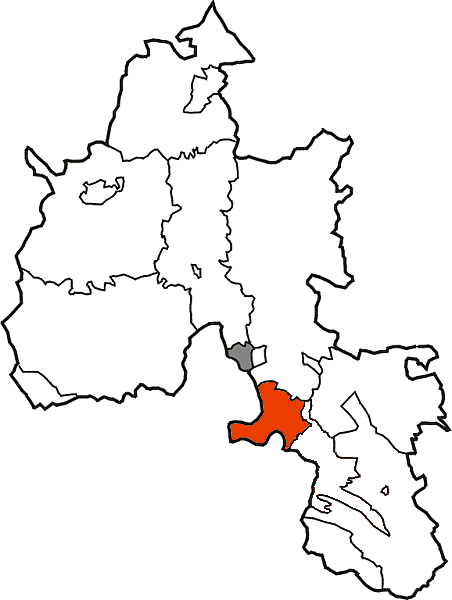
- Area
  - 1901: 12,346 acres (50.0 km^{2})
  - 1931: 12,345 acres (50.0 km^{2})
- Population
  - 1891: 2,692
  - 1911: 2,614
  - 1931: 2,758
- History
  - Created: 1894
  - Abolished: 1932
  - Succeeded by: Bullingdon Rural District
- Status: Rural district
  - HQ: Abingdon

Culham was a rural district in Oxfordshire, England, from 1894 to 1932. It was formed under the Local Government Act 1894 from the part of the Abingdon Rural Sanitary District in the administrative county of Oxfordshire. The remainder of the sanitary district, in the administrative county of Berkshire, became Abingdon Rural District. The rural district council continued to be based at Abingdon, holding meetings in the workhouse of the poor law union.

== Parishes ==
The rural district consisted of ten civil parishes:

- Burcot
- Chislehampton
- Clifton Hampden
- Culham
- Drayton St Leonard
- Marsh Baldon
- Nuneham Courtenay
- Sandford on Thames
- Stadhampton
- Toot Baldon

== Abolition ==
Culham Rural District was abolished under a County Review Order in 1932, merging with a number of other districts to form Bullingdon Rural District. Since 1974 the area has formed part of the South Oxfordshire district.
