= Crowmarsh Rural District =

Former local government area in the UK

Coordinates: 51.6°N 1.1°W

Crowmarsh
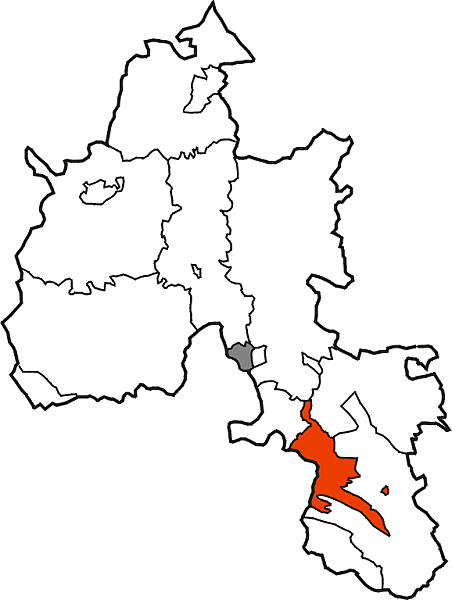
- Area
  - 1901: 20,164 acres (81.6 km^{2})
  - 1931: 20,164 acres (81.6 km^{2})
- Population
  - 1891: 5,150
  - 1911: 5,014
  - 1931: 5,133
- History
  - Created: 1894
  - Abolished: 1932
  - Succeeded by: Bullingdon Rural District, Henley Rural District
- Status: Rural district
  - HQ: Wallingford

Crowmarsh was a rural district in Oxfordshire, England from 1894 to 1932.

It was created under the Local Government Act 1894 from the part of the Wallingford rural sanitary district in Oxfordshire. The remainder of the sanitary district was in Berkshire and became the Wallingford Rural District. Crowmarsh Rural District continued to be administered from Wallingford, with meetings held in the workhouse in the town.

The district was abolished in 1932 under a County Review Order, being split between the existing Henley Rural District and the new Bullingdon Rural District. Since 1974 the entire area has been part of the district of South Oxfordshire, which also includes Wallingford and district.

== Civil parishes ==
The district consisted of the following civil parishes:

- Benson†
- Berrick Salome†
- Crowmarsh Gifford‡
- Dorchester†
- Ewelme (this parish had a detached part which formed an exclave of the rural district) †
- Mongewell‡
- Newnham Murren‡
- Newington†
- North Stoke‡
- South Stoke‡
- Warborough†

†To Bullingdon RD in 1932

‡To Henley RD in 1932
