= Headington Rural District =

Rural district in Oxfordshire, England

Coordinates: 51.75°N 1.16°W

Headington was a rural district in Oxfordshire, England from 1894 to 1932, based on the Headington rural sanitary district. It covered an area to the east of the city of Oxford. The parish of Headington was split out as a separate urban district in 1927.

It was abolished under a County Review Order in 1932. Most went to form part of Bullingdon Rural District, with the parish of Horton cum Studley/Studley going to the new Ploughley Rural District.
