= Vale and Downland Museum =

Local museum in Wantage, Oxfordshire

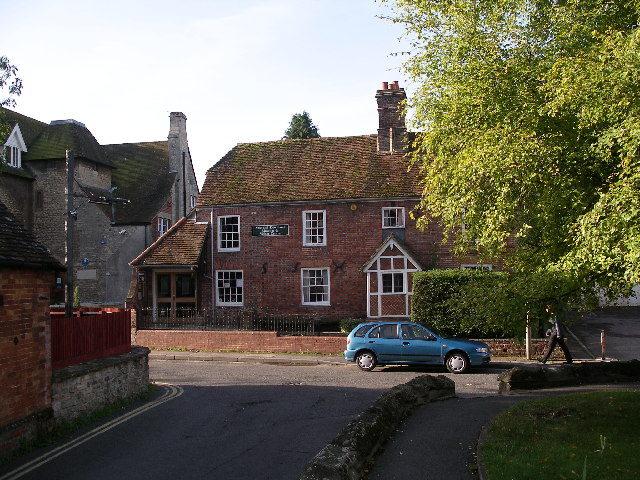

- Location in Oxfordshire
- Established: 1958; 68 years ago
- Location: Wantage, Oxfordshire, England
- Coordinates: 51.58805°N 1.42809°W
- Type: Museum of Local Culture and History
- Visitors: 53,000
- Public transit access: S9 & X32 buses from Oxford, X1 buses from Abingdon and X36 & X32 buses from Didcot
- Website: valeanddownlandmuseum.org.uk

The Vale and Downland Museum is a local history museum in the market town of Wantage, Oxfordshire, England. The Vale and Downland Museum Trust was formed in 1972. The museum was officially opened by the Dutchess of Devonshire on 29th September 1983. In 1999, a major refurbishment of the galleries was carried out with the aid of an award from the heritage lottery fund. In 2012, an extension was built to accommodate the cafe kitchen, office and collection store.

Often described as a hidden gem the museum is housed in the 'Old Surgery', Church Street opposite the Church of St Peter and St Paul. The original building dates from the late C1600s. This was an entirely timber framed post and trust design with box frames,wall panels and a thatch roof. Archives of the Dean and Chapter of Windsor show it was let to Alexander Doe in 1662, and then to wheelwright William Hazel in 1683. A datestone over a first floor window shows that the building was remodelled in 1780 by Lawrence Hazell. The historic building is linked to a modern extension creating 2 floors of exhibit space and to an 18th-century barn that originally stood in nearby East Hendred. The barn was disassembled, transported to Wantage, and reassembled to be incorporated into the museum.

Its galleries present the cultural heritage of the Vale of White Horse region around Wantage. They have a Victorian kitchen, Anglo-saxon skeleton, a life sized bronze statue of Wantage born Lester Piggott, a bust of Sir John Betjeman, Williams F1 display and lots more. From 2012 to 2025, a Williams Renault FW16B Formula One car, as driven by Damon Hill, was on display in the barn.

The museum is a community hub which has many things to offer the community. A programme of adult talks, a research library, a monthly book group, monthly music sessions for pre-schoolers as well as themed family days throughout the school holidays.

The museum won a 'Green Growth' award in 2026 after undertaking a major decarbonisation project which has reduced the museum's environmental impact.

There is a cafe and admission to the museum is free.

== Galleries ==
The auditorium has a seating area where you can watch four short films, two of which are narrated by Sir David Attenborough. There is a topographic model map of the Vale of White Horse.

The King Alfred gallery recreates an Anglo Saxon home. King Alfred the Great was born in Wantage in 849AD and this gallery helps tell the story of Alfred . The gallery includes a facsimile copy of ‘The Life of King Alfred’, the manuscript written by Alfred’s biographer Asser, that tells us that Alfred was born in Wantage. There is also a special film created in conjunction with local students that tells the story of the manuscript.

The Market Place displays information on the Wantage tanning, sackcloth and rope-making industries that thrived until the early 1800s. Wantage became famous for its tanneries, having one of the largest in the country. In the centre of the gallery stands a fragment of the Wantage Market Cross, erected in 1580.

The Ormond gallery tells the story of the Ormond Family and their involvement with the town over 150 years. John Ormond, who trained as an apothecary and came to Wantage in 1784. Examples of his trade are displayed in the bow window. The display includes Catherine Ormond’s parlour and there is a long-case clock made in Wantage by William Wise.

The Barn gallery includes a 28 foot double track model railway display. The layout includes Wantage Road and Challow stations on the Great Western Railway as they would have been during two time periods before and after their closure in 1964. One side of the layout shows the railway through the Vale of White Horse circa 1950, and the other side how it appeared in 1980. The gallery also shows how Lloyds Forge went from making wooden wheels to mending motor cars and the history of Wantage Engineering.

The Wantage Tramway gallery features a replica of the inside of a tram passenger car where a video of the tramway's history can be watched. The tramway was the first steam powered tramway to run alongside a public road.
