= Marcham =

Village in Oxfordshire, England

Coordinates: 51.668°N 1.342°W

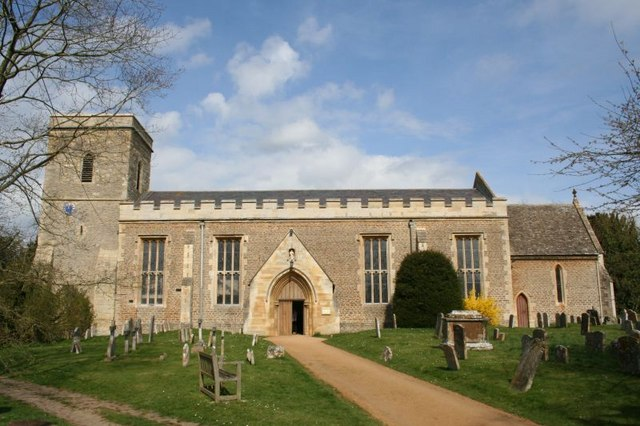
- All Saints' parish church

- Location within Oxfordshire
- Population: 1,905 (2011 census)
- OS grid reference: SU4596
- Civil parish: Marcham
- District: Vale of White Horse
- Shire county: Oxfordshire
- Region: South East
- Country: England
- Sovereign state: United Kingdom
- Post town: Abingdon
- Postcode district: OX13
- Dialling code: 01865
- Police: Thames Valley
- Fire: Oxfordshire
- Ambulance: South Central
- UK Parliament: Oxford West and Abingdon
- Website: Marcham Parish Council

Marcham is a village and civil parish about 2 miles (3 km) west of Abingdon, Oxfordshire. The 2011 census recorded the parish's population as 1,905. The parish includes the hamlets of Cothill 1 3/4 miles (2.8 km) east-northeast of the village, and Gozzard's Ford 1 1/2 miles (2.4 km) northeast of the village. Frilford and Garford used to be townships of Marcham parish, but are now separate civil parishes. All these parishes were part of Berkshire until the 1974 boundary changes transferred them to Oxfordshire.

Marcham parish extends about 3 1/2 miles (5.6 km) north–south and up to 1 1/2 miles (2.4 km) east–west. It is bounded to the south by the River Ock and to the east largely by Sandford Brook, a tributary of the Ock. To the west it is bounded largely by field boundaries. To the north the parish tapers almost to a point, bounded to the west by the A338 road, to the north by the A420 road and to the east by field boundaries. The land is low-lying, rising from about 177 feet (54 m) above sea level by the Ock in the south to 312 feet (95 m) at Upwood Park in the north. Marcham village is on the A415 road, which runs east–west through the parish. The A415 links Abingdon and A34 Marcham interchange to the east with Kingston Bagpuize on the A420 road to the west.

== Archaeology ==
In Trendles Field behind the former Noah's Ark Inn, in the extreme south-west of the parish, the remains of an Iron Age and Roman village have been excavated. Evidence has been found of round huts and grain storage pits, to which a Celtic religious shrine was later added. At the end of the first century a stone-built Romano-British temple was built on the site of one of the huts and a smaller stone building, possibly a shrine, was built on the site of the Iron Age shrine. The temple seems to have remained in use well into the 5th century. This site was subject to an excavation by Oxford University and a research project, with excavations being made each July until the summer of 2011. In 2009 it was announced that the remains of a possible amphitheatre had been found. The amphitheatre is unusual in that it is round, unlike most Romano-British arenas which are oval.

== Manor ==
The toponym "Marcham" is derived from the Old English Merceham, in which ham is a homestead and merece is a place where wild celery grows. The earliest record of the manor of Marcham is from 965, when King Edgar the Peaceful granted to Abingdon Abbey an estate of 50 hides that included Marcham. The Domesday Book of 1086 records that the abbey still held Marcham after the Norman Conquest of England. The abbey was forced to surrender all of its estates to the Crown in 1538 in the dissolution of the monasteries.

== Parish church ==
The oldest parts of the Church of England Parish Church of All Saints are 13th-century, including the west tower and probably the font. The south doorway is Perpendicular Gothic from either the late 14th or early 15th century. Also Perpendicular are the timber roof of the nave and the 15th-century doorway to the west tower. The church was heavily rebuilt in 1837. It is a Grade II* listed building. The tower has a ring of six bells. James Wells of Aldbourne, Wiltshire, cast the second, fourth, fifth and tenor bells in 1816. Charles and George Mears of the Whitechapel Bell Foundry cast the treble bell in 1855. The Whitechapel Bell Foundry also cast or recast the third bell in 1988.

== Economic and social history ==
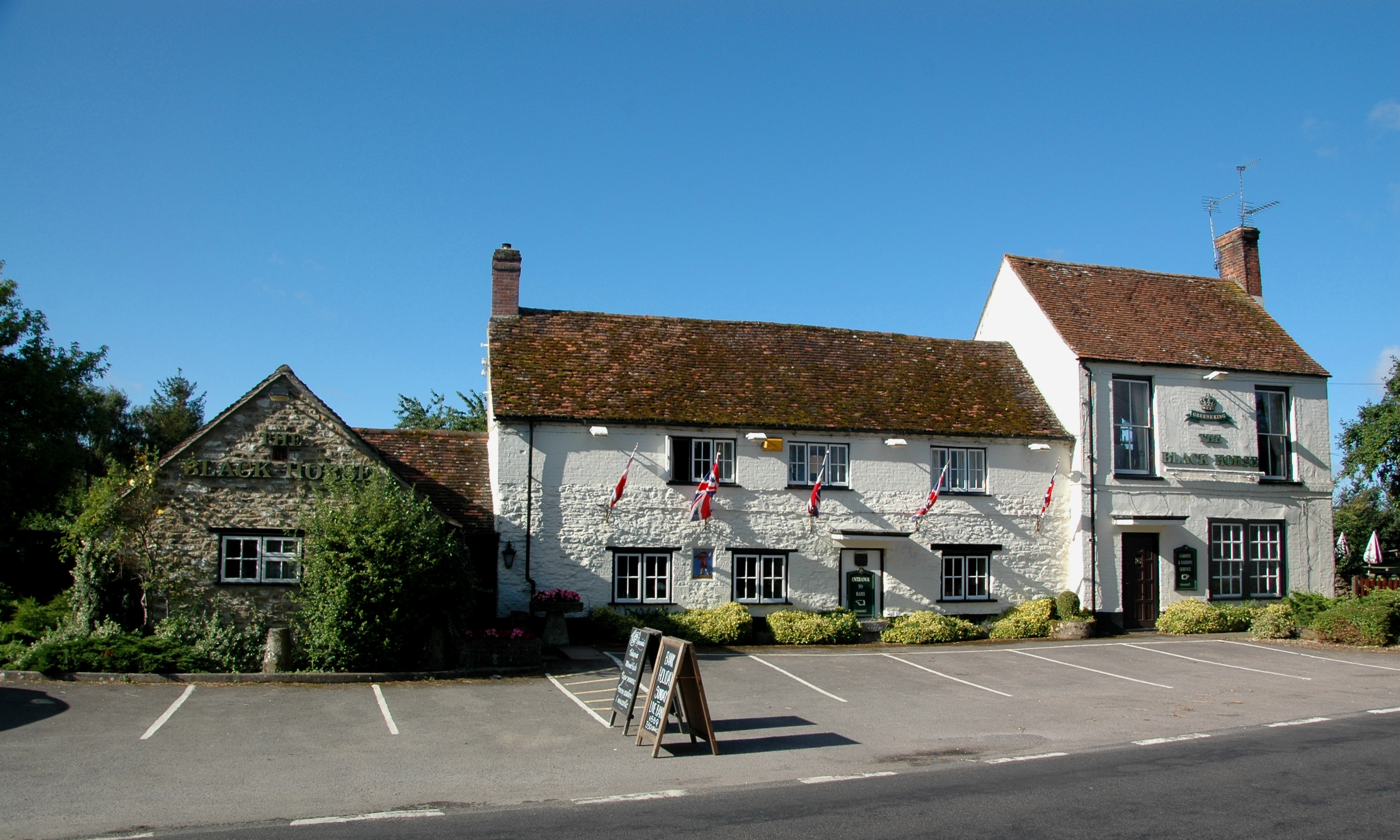
The Black Horse at Gozzard's Ford

Hyde Farmhouse on the eastern side of the village is late 13th- or early 14th-century. It was remodelled and extended in the middle of the 16th century and again in the middle of the 17th century. It is a Grade II* listed building. Just southwest of the village is a circular dovecote. It is either late medieval or 16th-century. On the south side of the village is The Priory. It is mid-16th-century and a Grade II* listed building. Marcham has long had a watermill on the Ock, about 3/4 mile (1.2 km) south of the village. The present mill building is 17th-century, with an 18th-century extension. An open field system of farming continued in the parish until 1836, when the inclosure award for Marcham was made. The road east–west through Gozzard's Ford used to be a turnpike linking Abingdon in the east to Fyfield in the west. It was later disturnpiked, and in the 20th century the part between Gozzard's Ford and Shippon was closed and dismantled to make way for one of the runways at RAF Abingdon.

=== Air crash ===
On 11 February 1942 an Armstrong Whitworth Whitley V bomber aircraft, N1439 of No. 10 Operational Training Unit RAF, took off from RAF Abingdon for night circuit training. A minute later it crashed in Upwood Park in the north of Marcham parish and burst into flames. The crash was ascribed to an error by the trainee pilot. Three of the four crew were killed. The survivor, Sgt DE Hughes, was hospitalised in the Radcliffe Infirmary in Oxford and survived the rest of the War.

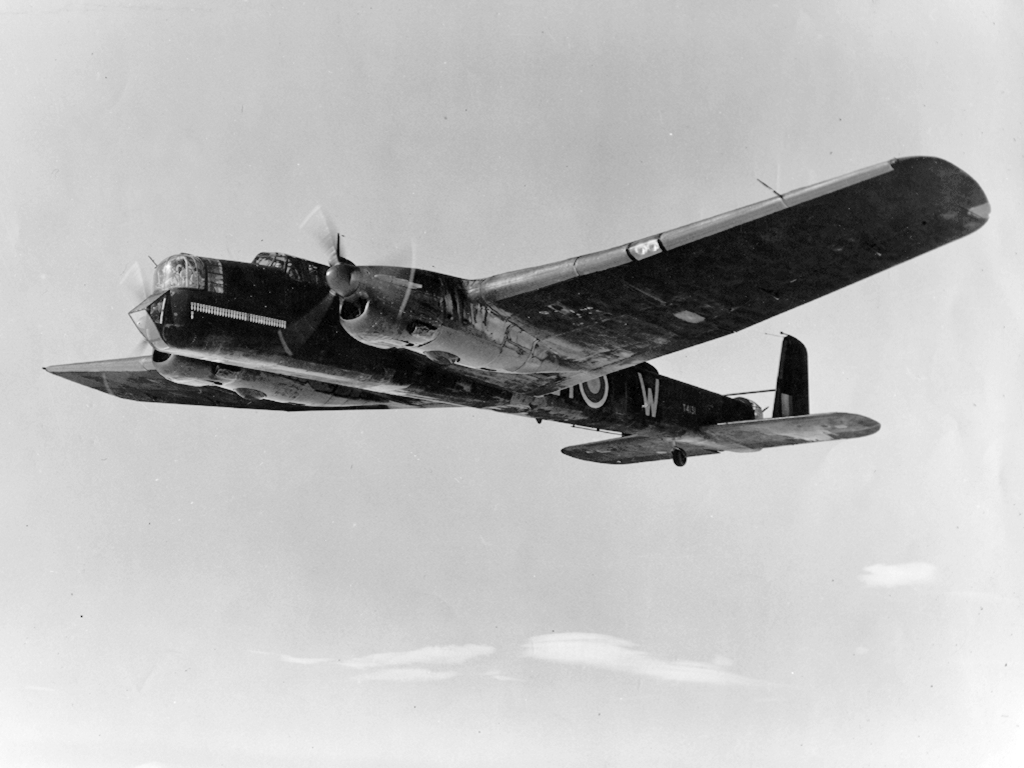
An Armstrong Whitworth Whitley V aircraft, similar to N1439 which crashed at Upwood Park

== Amenities ==
Marcham has a Church of England Primary School. Denman College, the National Federation of Women's Institutes' residential adult education college, is in Marcham, though in 2020 the NFWI announced plans for its closure. Marcham Football Club plays in North Berks Football League Division Two. President and Life Member of the Berks & Bucks Football Association and North Berks Football League, W.J. Gosling, was born in the village in 1928. Marcham Cricket club plays in the Oxfordshire Cricket Association League. Marcham Centre was opened on 19 June 2020 providing Marcham with a village hall, Multi-Use Games Area (MUGA) and playing fields. Marcham has a village shop and post office called MVS.

=== Transport ===
Oxford Bus Company and its sister company Thames Travel operate buses Oxford, Abingdon, Millets Farm, Southmoor, Standlake, Witney, Grove, Wantage, Harwell Campus & Didcot.

== Sources and further reading ==
- Hingley, R (1985). "Location, Function and Status: a Romano-British 'religious complex' at the Noah's Ark Inn, Frilford (Oxfordshire)". Oxford Journal of Archaeology. 4 (2): 201–214. doi:10.1111/j.1468-0092.1985.tb00242.x.
- Kamash, Z, Gosden C, and Lock G. 2010. "Continuity and Religious Practices in Roman Britain: The Case of the Rural Religious Complex at Marcham/Frilford, Oxfordshire". Britannia 41: 95–125.
- Page, W.H.; Ditchfield, P.H., eds. (1924). A History of the County of Berkshire. Victoria County History. Vol. 4. assisted by John Hautenville Cope. London: The St Katherine Press. pp. 354–360.
- Pevsner, Nikolaus (1966). Berkshire. The Buildings of England. Harmondsworth: Penguin Books. pp. 146, 176, 177.
