= Beckley and Stowood =

Civil parish in South Oxfordshire, England

Coordinates: 51.8°N 1.16°W

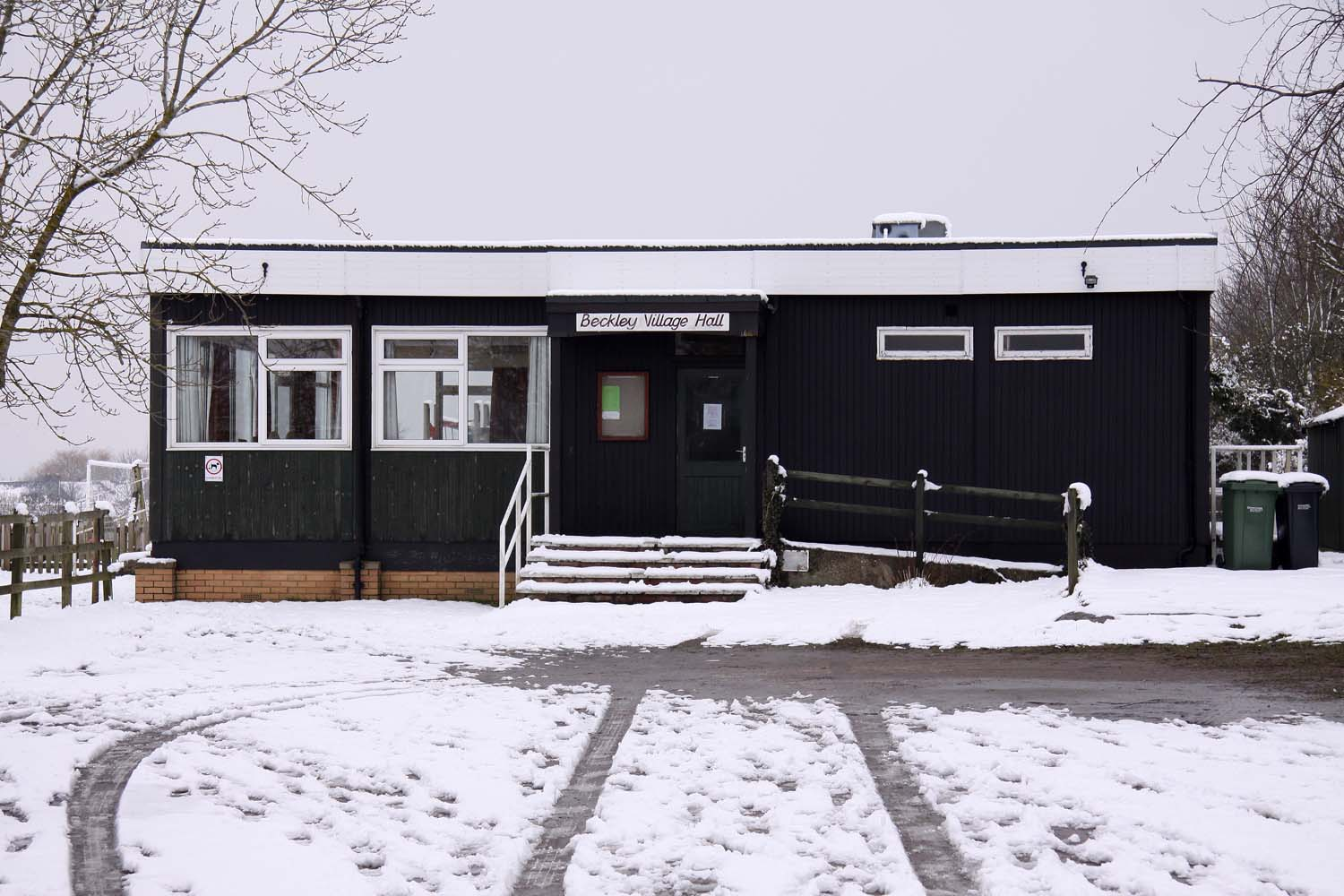
- Beckley Village Hall
- Population: 587
- District: Oxford
- Shire county: Oxfordshire
- Region: South East
- Country: England
- Sovereign state: United Kingdom
- Police: Thames Valley
- Fire: Oxfordshire
- Ambulance: South Central
- UK Parliament: Henley and Thame
- Website: Beckley and Stowood parish council

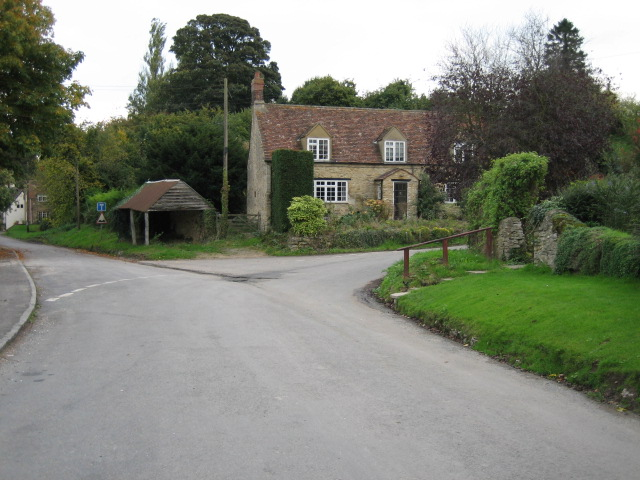
an Image of Beckley and Stowood

Beckley and Stowood is a civil parish in South Oxfordshire, England. Its area is 9.17 km^{2}. It is 3 miles (4.8 km) northeast of Oxford and 1 mile (1.6 km) west of the M40. The parish is made up of Beckley and Stowood.
