= Wallingford Rural District =

Former local government area in the UK

Wallingford
- History
  - Created: 1894
  - Abolished: 31 March 1974
  - Succeeded by: South Oxfordshire
- Status: Rural district
- Map of boundary as of 1971

Wallingford Rural District, an administrative area in what was once Berkshire, now Oxfordshire area, in southern England was established in 1894, from the then Berkshire area within Wallingford Rural Sanitary Authority (the Oxfordshire area becoming Crowmarsh Rural District). Wallingford Rural District Council provided many local government functions for the area around the town of Wallingford including Didcot, but not for the borough of Wallingford, which was covered by Wallingford Borough Council. These functions included dealing with contagious diseases, and wartime evacuations and air raid precautions. It also covered housing, water supply and sewage, and fire brigades.

Until the 1950s the council had its offices outside its territory, in the town of Wallingford. In the 1950s the council moved to Didcot, the district's largest settlement, converting the former Northbourne Vicarage on Broadway to become its headquarters. Shortly afterwards, in 1955, a proposal to change the name of the district to Didcot Rural District was considered but rejected.

In 1974 Wallingford RD became part of the district of South Oxfordshire, administered by South Oxfordshire District Council.

== Civil parishes ==
The district contained the following civil parishes during its existence:

- Aston Tirrold
- Aston Upthorpe
- Brightwell-cum-Sotwell
- Cholsey
- Didcot
- East Hagbourne
- Little Wittenham
- Long Wittenham
- Moulsford
- North Moreton
- South Moreton
- West Hagbourne
