= Henley Rural District =

Former rural district in Oxfordshire, England

Coordinates: 51.57°N 1.02°W

Henley was a rural district in Oxfordshire, England from 1894 to 1974.

It was named after the borough of Henley-on-Thames, which it surrounded on the west but did not include.

It was created by the Local Government Act 1894 from the bulk of the Henley rural sanitary district, with three Buckinghamshire parishes forming a Hambleden Rural District.

1932 saw the district change borders significantly, by annexing Goring Rural District and some of the disbanded Crowmarsh Rural District, whilst losing other parts to the new Bullingdon Rural District.

It was abolished under the Local Government Act 1972 in 1974, and now forms part of the South Oxfordshire district.
