= Pusey, Oxfordshire =

Village in Oxfordshire, England

Coordinates: 51.667°N 1.483°W

Pusey
- Location within Oxfordshire
- Population: 55 (2001 census)
- OS grid reference: SU3596
- Civil parish: Pusey
- District: Vale of White Horse
- Shire county: Oxfordshire
- Region: South East
- Country: England
- Sovereign state: United Kingdom
- Post town: Faringdon
- Postcode district: SN7
- Police: Thames Valley
- Fire: Oxfordshire
- Ambulance: South Central
- UK Parliament: Witney

Pusey is a village and civil parish 4 miles (6.4 km) east of Faringdon in the Vale of White Horse district in Oxfordshire, England. It was historically part of Berkshire. The village is just south of the A420 and the parish covers about 1,000 acres (400 ha).

== History ==
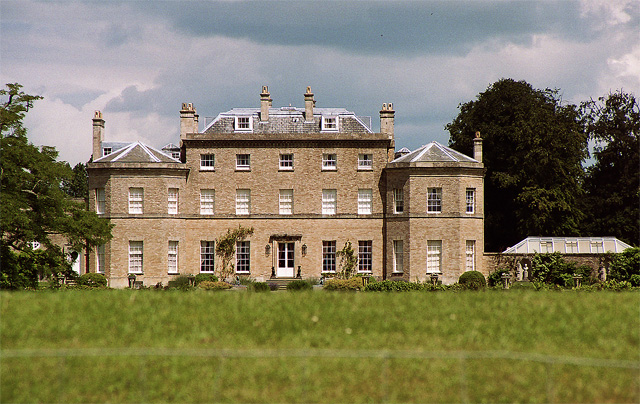
Pusey House

Pusey seems to be a Saxon settlement. Its toponym is derived from the Old English pise ēg, meaning "pea island". The Domesday Book of 1086 records the village as Pesei. The Pusey family held the manor of Pusey from Saxon times. There is a tradition that it was granted to the family by Cnut the Great, by the delivery of a horn (an Anglo-Saxon form of land tenure known as "cornage"). The Pusey Horn is now in the Victoria and Albert Museum in London. In Anglo-saxon an inscription on the horn reads: "Kyng Knowde geue Wyllyam Pewte thys horne to holde by thy land" ("King Canute gave William Pusey this horn to hold by [it] the land")

In 1753, the family built Pusey House (not to be confused with Pusey House, Oxford), a Grade II* listed country house. It was designed by John Sanderson for John Allen Pusey. Edward Bouverie Pusey, English churchman and Regius Professor of Hebrew at Oxford, was born there in 1800. The Church of England parish church of All Saints was rebuilt in 1745–50 by John Allen Pusey, at his own expense. The south transept monument was built by Peter Scheemakers in memory of John Allen Pusey and his wife Jane.

== Sources and further reading ==
- Mills, A. D.; Room, A. (2003). A Dictionary of British Place-Names. Oxford: Oxford University Press. ISBN 0-19-852758-6.
- Page, W. H.; Ditchfield, P. H., eds. (1924). A History of the County of Berkshire, Volume 4. Victoria County History. pp. 471–474.
- Pevsner, Nikolaus (1966). Berkshire. The Buildings of England. Harmondsworth: Penguin Books. pp. 195–196.
