= Garford =

Village in Oxfordshire, England

Coordinates: 51.662°N 1.382°W

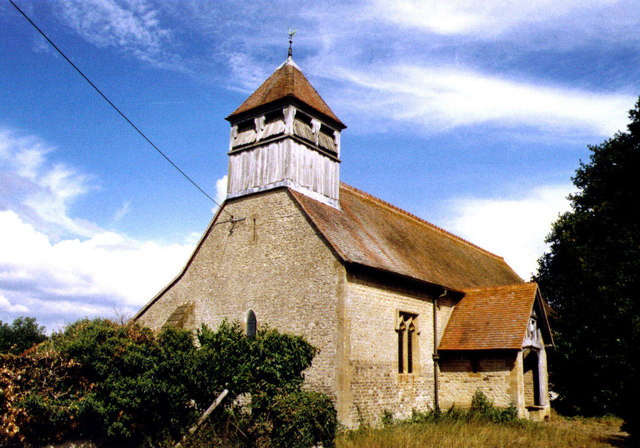
- St Luke's chapel, seen from the southwest

- Location within Oxfordshire
- Population: 229 (2011 census)
- OS grid reference: SU4296
- Civil parish: Garford
- District: Vale of White Horse
- Shire county: Oxfordshire
- Region: South East
- Country: England
- Sovereign state: United Kingdom
- Post town: Abingdon
- Postcode district: OX13
- Dialling code: 01235
- Police: Thames Valley
- Fire: Oxfordshire
- Ambulance: South Central
- UK Parliament: Witney

Garford is a village and civil parish about 4 miles (6.4 km) west of Abingdon. It was part of Berkshire until the 1974 boundary changes transferred it to Oxfordshire. The parish is bounded by the River Ock to the north, by two tributaries of the Ock to the south (Childrey Brook and Nor Brook), and by field boundaries and the road between Kingston Bagpuize and West Hanney to the west. The 2011 census recorded the parish's population as 229.

== Archaeology ==
The course of a Roman road passes through the parish about 0.5 miles (800 m) east of the village.

== Manor ==
Garford's toponym evolved from Garanford in the 10th century to Wareford in the 11th century before reaching its current form. In 940 Edmund I gave 15 houses at Garford to his thegn Wulfric, and in 960 Edmund's son Edgar the Peaceful confirmed the grant. The Benedictine Abingdon Abbey held two hides of land at Garford by the time of the Norman Conquest of England in 1066. Apart from brief interruptions during the reign of William II the Abbey retained Garford until 1538, when it surrendered its lands to the Crown in the dissolution of the monasteries. Elizabeth I sold Garford in 1576, after which it changed hands a number of times.

In 1624 Garford was bought jointly by Elizabeth Craven (née Whitmore), widow of William Craven, by Sir William Whitmore and by Elizabeth's son Thomas Craven. By the time of the English Civil War Garford was among the estates of William, Baron Craven, who supported the Royalists. When the Parliamentarians won the civil war the Commonwealth of England's treason trustees confiscated all of the Baron's estates. After the restoration of the English monarchy Craven's estates were restored to him and in 1664 he was created 1st Earl of Craven. Garford remained among the estates of the Barons Craven until 1821, when it was sold by another William Craven, 1st Earl of Craven.

== Chapel ==
Since at least the 13th century, Garford has been part of the ancient ecclesiastical parish of Marcham. The Church of England chapel of Saint Luke dates from the 13th century, but was largely rebuilt in 1880 by Gothic Revival architect Edwin Dolby. The east window of the chancel is a pair of 13th-century lancets and the south doorway of the nave is also largely 13th century. There is a 14th- or 15th-century window in the south wall of the nave, and a 16th- or 17th-century window on the south side of the chancel. The chapel's other windows are largely Victorian. The ancient windows seem to occupy roughly the same positions in the rebuilt chapel as they did in the original building. There is a wooden bell-turret with one bell.

== Economic history ==
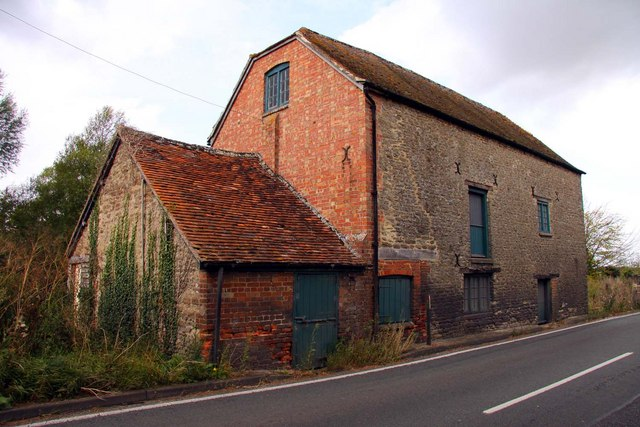
Venn Mill, built about 1800

The Domesday Book records that by 1086 Garford had a watermill. There is a record of Garford having a watermill in the 16th century. The present Venn Mill, on Childrey Brook where the Roman road between Besselsleigh and Wantage crosses the stream, was built in about 1800 but may occupy the same site as the ancient mill. It is in full working order but for insurance reasons is open to the public only occasionally. Garden Games, a supplier of outdoor play equipment, is based at Chadwick Farm in the west of the parish.

An open field system of farming prevailed in the parish until the beginning of the 19th century. Unusually, Parliament passed two Inclosure Acts for Garford: the first taking effect in 1814–15 and the second being passed in 1825. Under an Act of Parliament of 1771, the Besselsleigh Turnpike Trust took over management of the road between Hungerford and Wantage and the Roman road between Wantage and Besselsleigh. The road ceased to be a turnpike in 1878.

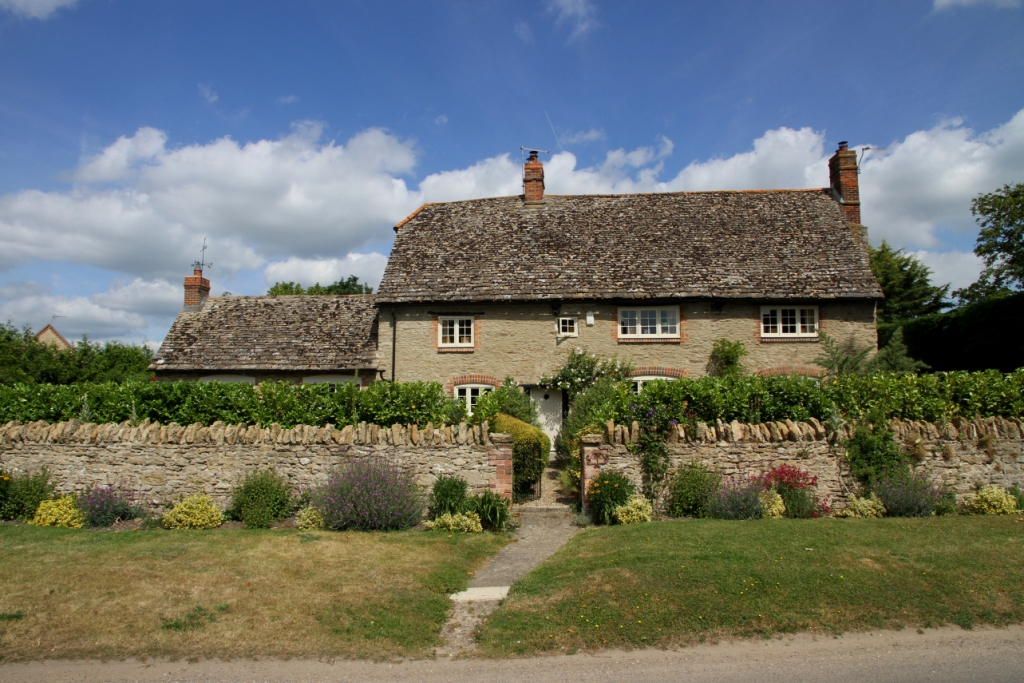
Millett's Farm Cottages, an 18th-century former farmhouse

== Sources ==
- Page, W.H.; Ditchfield, P.H., eds. (1924). A History of the County of Berkshire. Victoria County History. Vol. 4. assisted by John Hautenville Cope. London: The St Katherine Press. pp. 354–360.
- Pevsner, Nikolaus (1966). Berkshire. The Buildings of England. Harmondsworth: Penguin Books. p. 146.
