= Littleworth, Vale of White Horse =

Village in Oxfordshire, England

Coordinates: 51.673°N 1.550°W

Littleworth
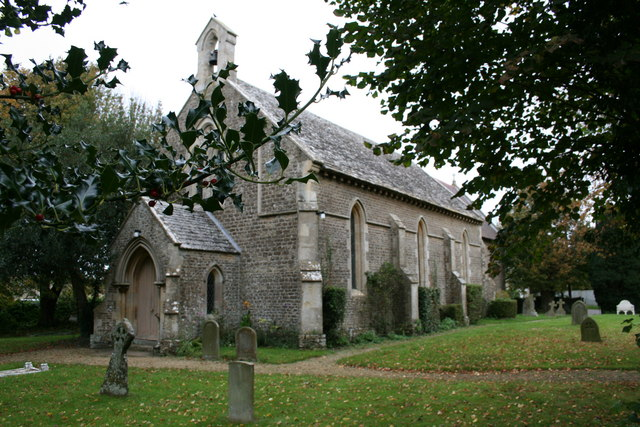
- Church of the Holy Ascension

- Location within Oxfordshire
- Population: 239 (2011 Census)
- OS grid reference: SU3197
- Civil parish: Littleworth
- District: Vale of White Horse
- Shire county: Oxfordshire
- Region: South East
- Country: England
- Sovereign state: United Kingdom
- Post town: Faringdon
- Postcode district: SN7
- Dialling code: 01367
- Police: Thames Valley
- Fire: Oxfordshire
- Ambulance: South Central
- UK Parliament: Witney

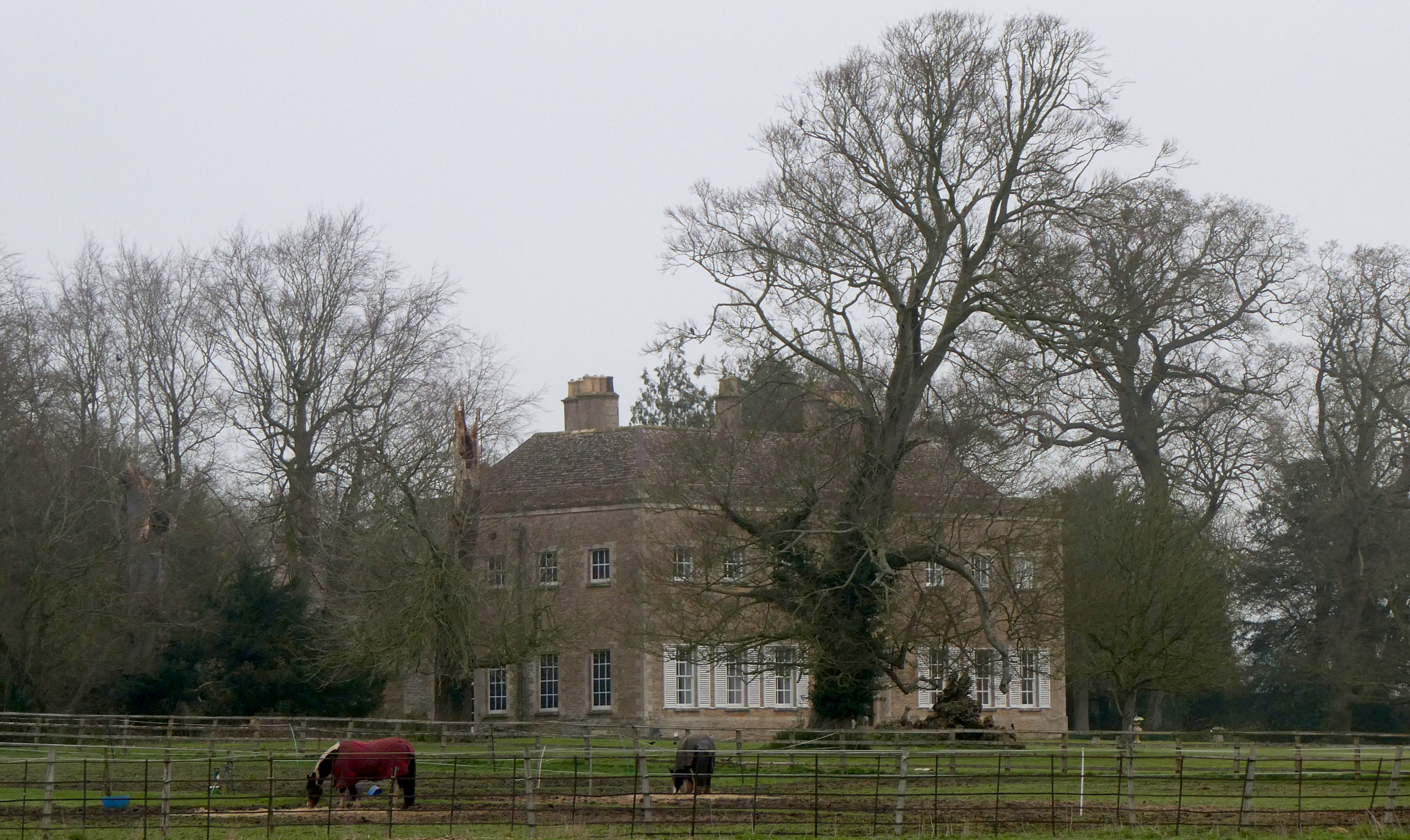
A view of Wadley Manor in the hamlet of Wadley near Littleworth, Vale of the White Horse, Oxfordshire, England. March 2026.

Littleworth is a small village and civil parish off the A420, almost 2 miles (3 km) northeast of Faringdon. It was part of Berkshire until the 1974 boundary changes transferred it to Oxfordshire. The parish includes the hamlets of Thrupp and Wadley. The 2011 Census recorded the parish's population as 239.

== History ==
Littleworth used to be part of the ecclesiastical parish of Great Faringdon. At the time of the Domesday Book in 1086 it appears to have been part of the manor of Worth. The manor became known as Wadley by the 13th century, and in 1440 Henry VI granted it to Oriel College, Oxford. In the 16th century Wadley manor house was leased to the Unton family, who were prominent at the court of Elizabeth I, among them Henry Unton the diplomat. The house was visited by the queen in 1574 and by James I in 1603. The main settlement at Worth became known as Littleworth by the late 13th century, to distinguish it from Longworth about 5 miles (8 km) to the east. Littleworth was made a separate ecclesiastical parish in 1843 but was not made a separate civil parish until 1952.

== Parish church ==
The Church of England parish church of The Holy Ascension has been on the same site since the 12th century. However, the present building was designed by HJ Underwood of Oxford and built on the original Norman foundations in 1839. Its chancel was rebuilt in 1876. The church is a Grade II listed building.

== Sources ==
- Mills, A.D.; Room, Adrian (2003). A Dictionary of British Place-Names. Oxford: Oxford University Press. ISBN 0-19-852758-6.
- Page, W.H.; Ditchfield, P.H., eds. (1924). A History of the County of Berkshire. Victoria County History. Vol. 4. assisted by John Hautenville Cope. London: The St Katherine Press. pp. 489–499.
- Pevsner, Nikolaus (1966). Berkshire. The Buildings of England. Harmondsworth: Penguin Books. p. 169.
