= Berinsfield =

Village in South Oxfordshire, England

Coordinates: 51.662°N 1.174°W

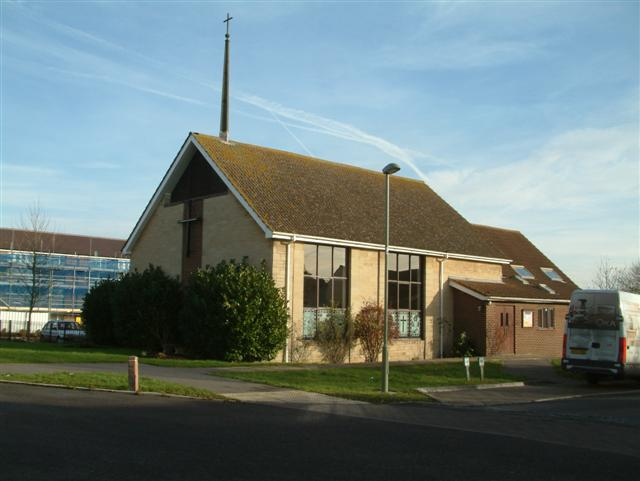
- Parish church of St. Mary & St. Berin

- Location within Oxfordshire
- Area: 3.73 km^{2} (1.44 sq mi)
- Population: 2,806 (2011 Census)
  - Density: 752/km^{2} (1,950/sq mi)
- OS grid reference: SU5796
- Civil parish: Berinsfield
- District: South Oxfordshire
- Shire county: Oxfordshire
- Region: South East
- Country: England
- Sovereign state: United Kingdom
- Post town: Wallingford
- Postcode district: OX10
- Dialling code: 01865
- Police: Thames Valley
- Fire: Oxfordshire
- Ambulance: South Central
- UK Parliament: Henley and Thame
- Website: Berinsfield Parish Council

Berinsfield is an English village and civil parish in South Oxfordshire, about 7 miles (11 km) southeast of Oxford. The 2011 Census recorded the parish population as 2,806.

== History ==
Palaeolithic and Roman artefacts were found during 20th century excavations to build the village. The Roman road between Dorchester-on-Thames and Alchester runs through the centre of Berinsfield. An Anglo-Saxon cemetery was also found at Berinsfield. The village is on the site of RAF Mount Farm, a satellite of RAF Benson, initially used to train bomber pilots. It was later taken over by the United States Army Air Forces, who used it as a reconnaissance base. From here stars including Bob Hope, Dorothy Lamour and Glenn Miller took off to entertain the troops in Europe. Miller performed for the US service personnel at the base in December 1944 before his fateful flight from RAF Twinwood Farm which disappeared en route to Paris.

After World War II the disused airbase was occupied by squatters, some of whom stayed for over a decade until, in 1957, the Air Ministry sold the airfield for civilian use. Bullingdon Rural District Council decided to build a new council estate to be named after Birinus or Berin, a local saint. The word 'field' was added because the Americans called their base an airfield. Many new residents at that time lived in the former Royal Air Force huts until brick-built houses were constructed on the site. Berinsfield is the first English village to be built on virgin land for more than 200 years. It was designed by the architect and town planner William Holford in 1960. The Church of England parish church of Saint Mary and Saint Berin was designed by Rev. Harold Best, vicar of Dorchester, and built in 1962.

== Amenities ==
Berinsfield has amenities including a primary school, public library, sports centre, Berinsfield Community Association and Social Club, and local shops. The village is also home to Berinsfield Amateur Boxing Club, and Berinsfield Football Club. Berinsfield has a local branch of the Women's Institute, and previously offered a youth club for those aged between 10 and 21 ('The Berry Youth Club').

Thames Travel bus routes X38, X39 and X40 indirectly serve Berinsfield, linking the village to Oxford, Reading and Wallingford seven days a week and Henley-on-Thames from Monday to Saturday.

== Gallery ==
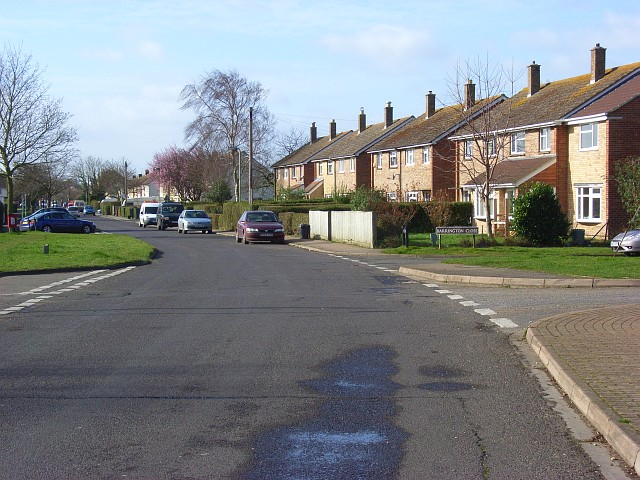
Part of Fane Drive, the main road within the village

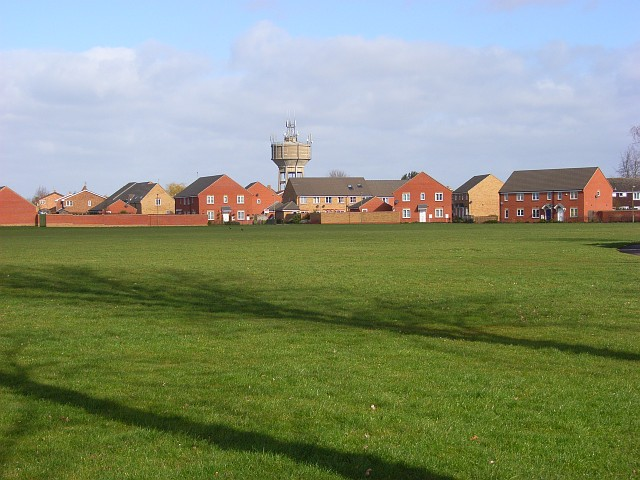
Houses in the northeast part of Berinsfield

== Sources ==
- Boyle, A; Dodd, A; Miles, D; Mudd, A (1995). Two Oxfordshire Anglo-Saxon Cemeteries: Berinsfield and Didcot. Thames Valley Landscape Series. Vol. 8. Oxford: Oxford University School of Archaeology. ISBN 0-947816-86-0.
- Lobel, Mary D, ed. (1962). "Dorchester". A History of the County of Oxford. Victoria County History. Vol. 7: Thame and Dorchester Hundreds. London: Oxford University Press for the Institute of Historical Research. pp. 39–64.
- Sherwood, Jennifer; Pevsner, Nikolaus (1974). Oxfordshire. The Buildings of England. Harmondsworth: Penguin Books. pp. 451–452. ISBN 0-14-071045-0.
