= Ploughley Rural District =

Former district in Oxfordshire, England

Coordinates: 51°51′N 1°14′W

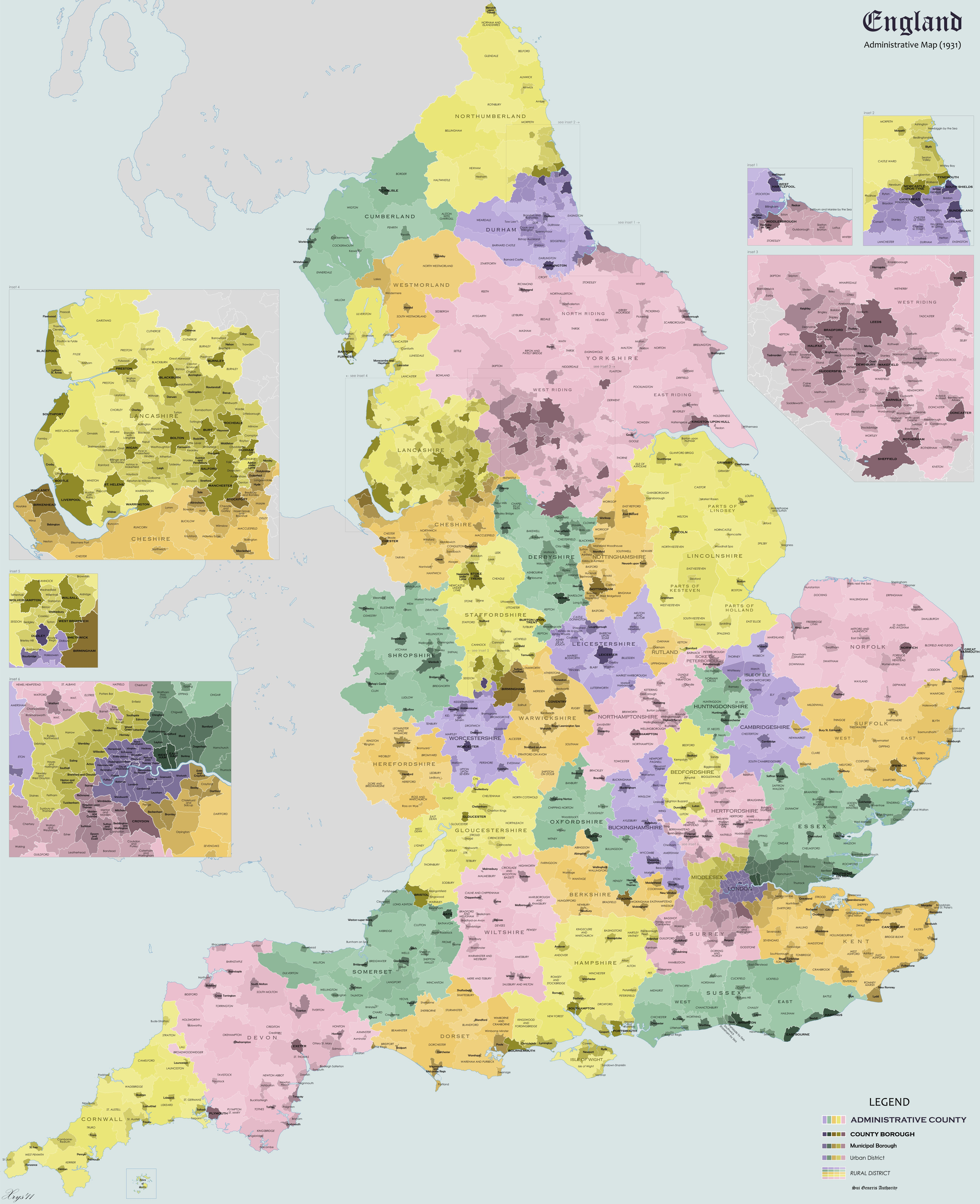
A 1931 administrative map of England.

Ploughley was a rural district in Oxfordshire, England, from 1932 to 1974. It entirely surrounded Bicester but did not include it.

It was created in 1932 from parts of the abolished Bicester Rural District, Headington Rural District and Woodstock Rural District, along with a couple of non-urban parishes from Bicester urban district.

In 1974 it was abolished under the Local Government Act 1972 and now forms part of the Cherwell district.
