= Eaton Hastings =

Village near Faringdon, England

Coordinates: 51.685°N 1.621°W

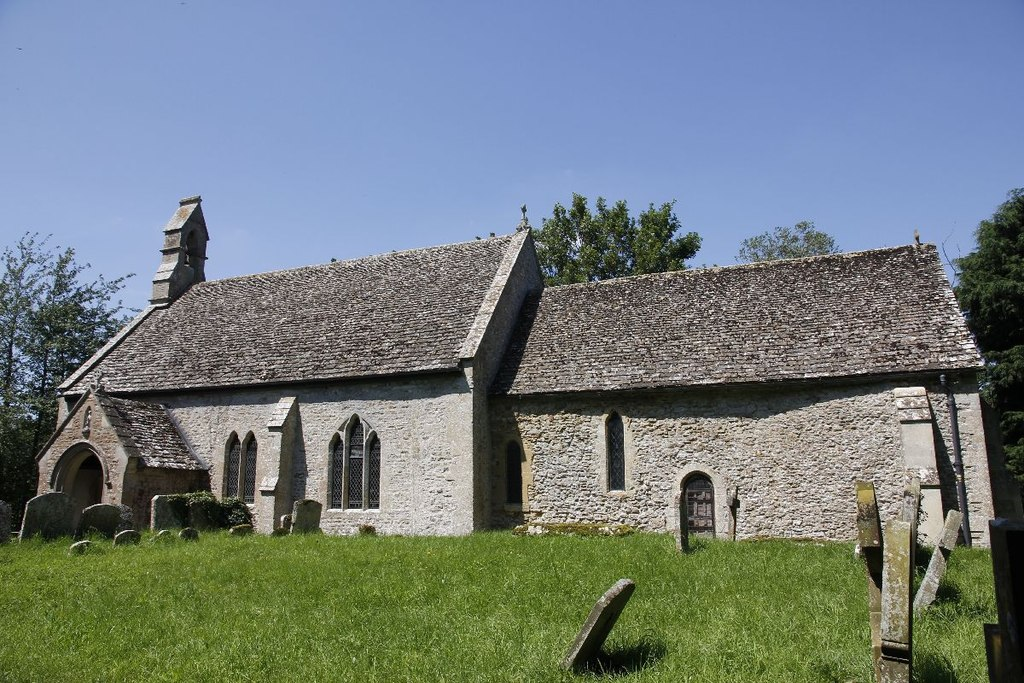
- St Michael and All Angels’ parish church

- Location within Oxfordshire
- Population: 81 (2001 Census)
- OS grid reference: SU260982
- Civil parish: Eaton Hastings
- District: Vale of White Horse
- Shire county: Oxfordshire
- Region: South East
- Country: England
- Sovereign state: United Kingdom
- Post town: Faringdon
- Postcode district: SN7
- Dialling code: 01367
- Police: Thames Valley
- Fire: Oxfordshire
- Ambulance: South Central
- UK Parliament: Witney

Eaton Hastings is a village and civil parish beside the River Thames about two-and-a-half miles (4 km) north-west of Faringdon. It was in Berkshire until the 1974 boundary changes transferred it to Oxfordshire. Eaton Hastings was once larger than it is today, when it can be seen as an all-but-deserted medieval village. The 2001 Census gave the parish population as 81.

== Parish church ==
The Church of England parish church of St Michael and All Angels is the most prominent original building to survive. The earliest parts date from the 11th century. It is built of rubblestone and consists of a simple nave, chancel and bellcote. The chancel is largely 13th century. In 1870–1873 the church underwent Victorian restoration. St Michael's is a Grade II* listed building. The west window holds stained glass of archangels Michael, Raphael and Gabriel. It was installed in 1935 by Morris & Co., but the designs dating from 1860 were created by William Morris and Ford Madox Brown. The north side of the chancel has another Morris & Co. stained-glass window, showing St Matthew. This was designed by Edward Burne-Jones and installed in 1872–1874. Alexander Henderson, 1st Baron Faringdon is buried in the churchyard; the angel on his tomb was sculpted by George Frampton. Next to the church is the former rectory, built in the 19th century.

== Economic and social history ==
The original village developed around the church, which remains along with a few dwellings around it. The population started to decline after 1349, so that by the 19th century it consisted only of a few scattered farmhouses. This has been attributed at various times to bubonic plague, to emparking and to sheep farming. Late in the 19th century, a group of houses was built on the Lechlade–Faringdon road, designed by the architect Ernest George for Alexander Henderson, 1st Baron Faringdon, as part of a social improvement project. Many people now regard this as Eaton Hastings, as the remaining buildings of the original settlement are hidden down a narrow lane.

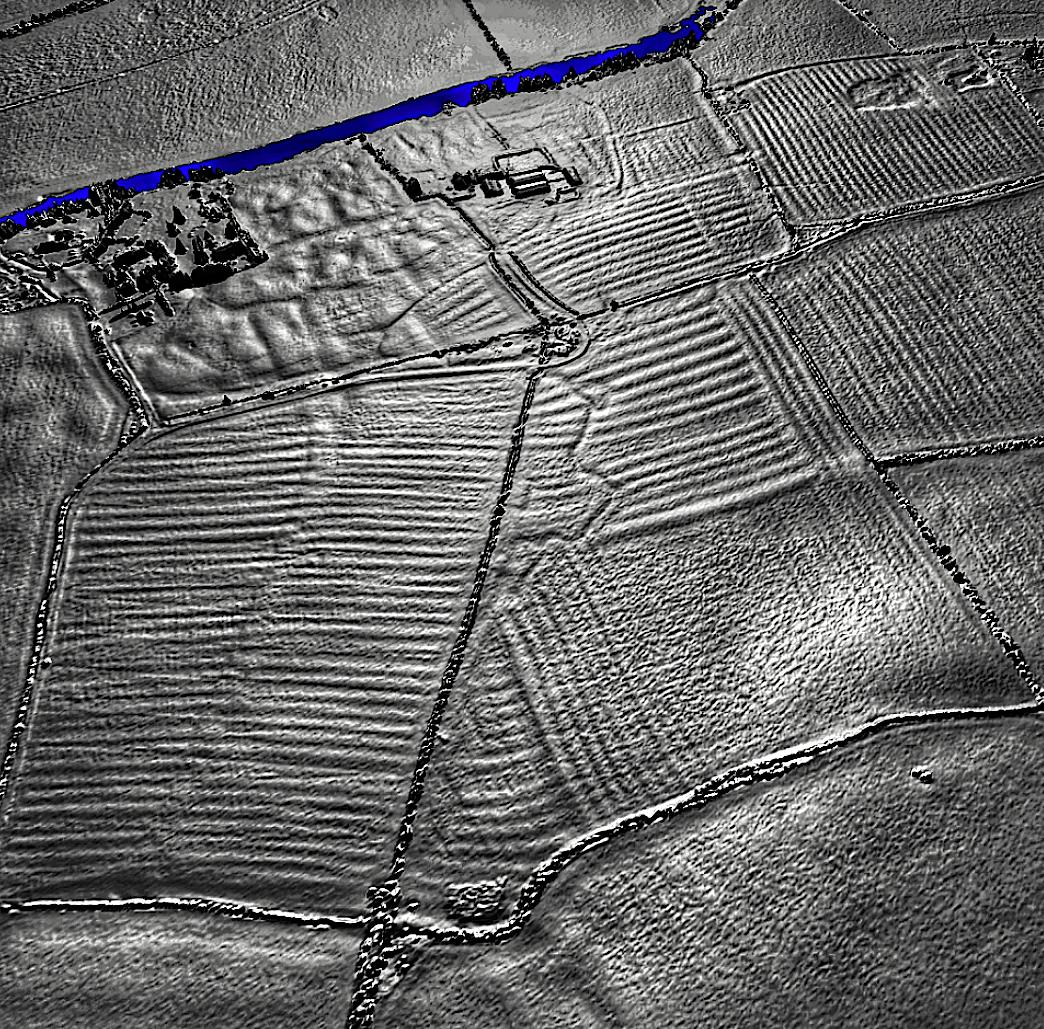
A lidar view of Eaton Hastings.

== Notable people ==
- Arturo Barea and Ilse Barea-Kulcsar, lived in Eaton Hastings in exile

== Sources ==
- Ditchfield, PH; Page, William, eds. (1924). "Eaton Hastings". A History of the County of Berkshire. Victoria County History. Vol. IV. assisted by John Hautenville Cope. London: The St Katherine Press. pp. 528–531.
- Pevsner, Nikolaus (1966). Berkshire. The Buildings of England. Harmondsworth: Penguin Books. pp. 135–136.
