= Bullingdon Rural District =

Rural district in Oxfordshire, England from 1932 to 1974

Coordinates: 51.7475°N 1.1305°W

- Rural district
- Population
  - 1939: 28,998
  - 1971: 50,870
- History
  - Created: 1 April 1932
  - Abolished: 31 March 1974
  - Succeeded by: South Oxfordshire
  - HQ: Oxford (1932–1971); Wheatley (1971–1974)
- Contained within
  - County Council: Oxfordshire

Bullingdon Rural District was a rural district in Oxfordshire, England from 1932 to 1974, covering an area to the south-east of the city of Oxford.

The district was created on 1 April 1932 under a County Review Order, as a merger of Wheatley Urban District, Culham Rural District, Thame Rural District, part of Crowmarsh Rural District, part of Headington Rural District, and part of Henley Rural District. The district was named after the hundred of Bullingdon, which had covered part of the area.

Bullingdon Rural District Council held its first meeting on 4 April 1932 at County Hall, Oxford, when George Parker, 7th Earl of Macclesfield, was appointed the council's first chairman. He had previously been the chairman of the Thame Rural District Council. For most of the district's existence its council was based in Oxford rather than in the district itself. In 1971 the council moved to offices on London Road in Wheatley. (Note: The offices were actually in the parish of Holton, but the postal address was London Road, Wheatley.)

The district was abolished under the Local Government Act 1972, becoming part of South Oxfordshire district on 1 April 1974. The new council continued to use the former Bullingdon Rural District Council offices in Wheatley until new purpose-built offices were opened at Crowmarsh Gifford in 1981. The site of the old offices in Wheatley was later redeveloped for housing, with a road called Fairfax Gate now occupying the site.
