= Appleton-with-Eaton =

Civil parish in Vale of White Horse, Oxfordshire, England

Coordinates: 51.72°N 1.36°W

- Civil parish
- Location within Oxfordshire
- Civil parish: Appleton-with-Eaton
- District: Vale of White Horse
- Shire county: Oxfordshire
- Region: South East
- Country: England
- Sovereign state: United Kingdom
- Post town: Abingdon
- Postcode district: OX13
- Dialling code: 01865
- Police: Thames Valley
- Fire: Oxfordshire
- Ambulance: South Central
- UK Parliament: Witney

Appleton-with-Eaton is a civil parish in the Vale of White Horse district of Oxfordshire, England, south west of Oxford. Historically it was part of Berkshire until the 1974 boundary changes transferred it to Oxfordshire. It consists of Appleton and Eaton, on the south bank (here the east bank) of the River Thames. Its area is 8.38 square kilometres (3.24 sq mi). According to the 2011 census the parish had 915 residents, an increase of 18 over ten years.
