= South Oxfordshire =

Coordinates: 51.65°N 1.05°W

South Oxfordshire District
- Non-metropolitan district
- River Thames, which flows through the middle of the district.

- Coat of arms

- South Oxfordshire shown within Oxfordshire
- Sovereign state: United Kingdom
- Constituent country: England
- Region: South East England
- Non-metropolitan county: Oxfordshire
- Historic county: Oxfordshire (north of River Thames); Berkshire (south of River Thames)
- Status: Non-metropolitan district
- Admin HQ: Abingdon-on-Thames
- Incorporated: 1 April 1974

Government
  - Type: Non-metropolitan district council
  - Body: South Oxfordshire District Council
  - Leadership: Leader & Cabinet (Liberal Democrat)
  - MPs: Olly Glover; Freddie van Mierlo

Area
  - Total: 261.99 sq mi (678.54 km^{2})
  - Rank: 48th (of 296)

Population (2024)
  - Total: 156,470
  - Rank: 144th (of 296)
  - Density: 597.25/sq mi (230.60/km^{2})

Ethnicity (2021)
  - Ethnic groups: List: 93.1% White; 2.9% Asian; 2.3% Mixed; 1% Black; 0.8% other

Religion (2021)
  - Religion: List: 49.9% Christianity; 41.1% no religion; 6% not stated; 1% Islam; 0.7% Hinduism; 0.5% other; 0.4% Buddhism; 0.2% Judaism; 0.2% Sikhism
- Time zone: UTC0 (GMT)
  - Summer (DST): UTC+1 (BST)
- ONS code: 38UD (ONS); E07000179 (GSS)
- OS grid reference: SU6571895057
- Website: www.southoxon.gov.uk

South Oxfordshire is a local government district in the ceremonial county of Oxfordshire, England. Its council is temporarily based outside the district at Abingdon-on-Thames pending a planned move to Didcot, the district's largest town. The areas located south of the River Thames are within the historic county of Berkshire.

== History ==
=== Establishment ===
The district was formed on 1 April 1974, under the Local Government Act 1972, covering the area of six former districts, which were abolished at the same time:

- Bullingdon Rural District
- Henley-on-Thames Municipal Borough
- Henley Rural District
- Thame Urban District
- Wallingford Municipal Borough
- Wallingford Rural District

The two Wallingford districts had previously been part of the administrative county of Berkshire, whilst the other four districts had been in the administrative county of Oxfordshire. The new district was originally given the name "Wallingford". The shadow authority elected in 1973 to oversee the transition requested a change of name to "South Oxfordshire", which was approved by the government before the new district formally came into being in 1974.

=== Possible merger ===
Under current local government reorganisation plans, all district councils in Oxfordshire, as well as the county council, will be abolished in 2028. Part of the district near Oxford would become part of a Greater Oxford unitary authority, while the rest would become part of a new Ridgeway unitary authority along with most of the fellow Oxfordshire district Vale of White Horse and the existing West Berkshire unitary.

However on 7 September 2026, the government announced that a number of ongoing local government reorganisations, including the one affection South Oxfordshire, would be paused until the decision is "reviewed". Planned elections to the shadow authority will now not go ahead next year, with South Oxfordshire Council elections taking place instead. It is not clear if and when the proposed changes will go ahead.

== Geography ==
The River Thames flows for approximately 47 miles through South Oxfordshire, forming the historic county boundary between Berkshire and Oxfordshire. It is also joined by the River Thame within the district. A characteristic of the rivers within the district is that they have wide floodplains with few houses on them so that fluvial flooding is a lesser problem than flash flooding. Towns in the district are Didcot, Henley-on-Thames, Thame, Wallingford and Watlington.

== Villages ==
See List of civil parishes in South Oxfordshire

The larger villages in the district include:

- Benson
- Berinsfield
- Chalgrove
- Chinnor
- Cholsey
- Dorchester
- Ewelme
- Goring-on-Thames
- Lewknor
- Shiplake
- Sonning Common
- Wheatley

== Population change and distribution ==
South Oxfordshire population pyramid

The 2001 Census recorded a population of just over 128,000 in the district. This was an increase of 7% since 1991. By the 2021 Census, the figure had risen to over 149,000.

Much of the district is rural in nature, with the land in agricultural use and around 70% of the district has a green belt or AONB designation (The northeast of the district forms part of the Oxford Green Belt). 50% of the district's population lives outside its four main towns of Didcot, Henley-on-Thames, Thame and Wallingford.

== Governance ==
South Oxfordshire District Council

Type
- Type: Non-metropolitan district

History
- Founded: 1 April 1974

Leadership
- Chair: Andrea Powell, Green since 14 May 2026
- Leader: Maggie Filipova-Rivers, Liberal Democrat since 11 December 2025
- Chief Executive: Adrianna Partridge (Note: Serves as joint chief executive for both South Oxfordshire and Vale of White Horse District Council) since 1 January 2026

Structure
- Seats: 36 councillors
- Political groups: Administration (21) Liberal Democrats (21) Other parties (15) Green (8) Henley Residents (3) Labour (3) Conservative (1)
- Length of term: 4 years

Elections
- Last election: 4 May 2023

Website
- southoxon.gov.uk

South Oxfordshire District Council provides district-level services. County-level services are provided by Oxfordshire County Council. The whole district is also covered by civil parishes, which form a third tier of local government.

Since 2008, the council has shared staff with neighbouring Vale of White Horse District Council.

=== Political control ===
The Liberal Democrats have held a majority of the seats on the council since the 2023 election. Despite having a majority, they at first continued a coalition with the Green Party that they had formed after the 2019 election. However, in May 2025 the Liberal Democrat group chose to end the coalition with the Greens and take full control.

The first election to the district council was held in 1973, initially operating as a shadow authority alongside the outgoing authorities until it came into its powers on 1 April 1974. Political control of the council since 1974 has been as follows:

Party in control	Years
No overall control	1974–1976
Conservative	1976–1995
No overall control	1995–2003
Conservative	2003–2019
No overall control	2019–2023
Liberal Democrats	2023–present

=== Leadership ===
The leaders of the council since 2003 have been:

Councillor	Party	From	To
Ann Ducker	Conservative	2003	21 Sep 2014
John Cotton	Conservative	16 Oct 2014	Apr 2018
Jane Murphy	Conservative	19 Apr 2018	May 2019
Sue Cooper	Liberal Democrats	16 May 2019	7 Oct 2021
David Rouane	Liberal Democrats	7 Oct 2021	11 Dec 2025
Maggie Filipova-Rivers	Liberal Democrats	11 Dec 2025	

=== Composition ===
Following the 2023 election, the composition of the council was:

Party	Councillors
Liberal Democrats	21
Green	8
Henley Residents Group	3
Labour	3
Conservative	1
Total	36

The next election is due in 2027.

=== Elections ===
Since the last full review of boundaries in 2015, the council has comprised 36 councillors representing 21 wards, with each ward electing one, two or three councillors. Elections are held every four years.

=== Premises ===
The council was initially based in various premises across the district in Henley, Thame, Wheatley, Wallingford and Didcot inherited from its predecessor authorities. In 1981 the council moved to a purpose-built headquarters on Benson Lane, Crowmarsh Gifford, near Wallingford.

On 15 January 2015, an arson attack destroyed the district council's main offices in Crowmarsh Gifford. As the fire started in the early hours of the morning there were no fatalities or injuries. Immediately after the fire, the council was temporarily based in Abingdon, in the neighbouring Vale of White Horse district. From later in 2015 until 2022 the council was based at Milton Park, sharing a building with Vale of White Horse District Council. The Council initially intended to return to Crowmarsh, but in October 2020 it was announced that both councils plan on relocating to a new building in Didcot, to be built on a site known as Didcot Gateway opposite Didcot Parkway railway station, aiming for completion in 2023. In 2022 the councils vacated Milton Park and returned to Abingdon, again on a temporary basis, whilst waiting for the Didcot Gateway scheme to be ready. In July 2025, the council decided to stop any new work on the Didcot Gateway project because of the impending Local Government Reorganisation.

== Media ==
In terms of television, the area is served by BBC South and ITV Meridian broadcast from the Oxford transmitter. However, southern parts of the district which includes Henley-on-Thames is served by BBC London and ITV London broadcasting from the Crystal Palace transmitter.

Radio stations for the area are BBC Radio Oxford, BBC Radio Berkshire (covering Henley-on-Thames), Heart South, and Greatest Hits Radio.

Local newspapers are Oxfordshire Guardian, Oxford Mail and Henley Standard.

== Recycling ==
South Oxfordshire has consistently one of the best recycling rates in England, coming top of the league table of the percentage of waste sent for recycling, reuse or composting in 2022/23 and 2023/24, with 62.9% of waste now recycled. The local authority has been placed at or near the top of the league table for over a decade.

== Energy consumption ==
In May 2006, a report commissioned by British Gas showed that housing in South Oxfordshire produced the 5th highest average carbon emissions in the country at 7,356 kg of carbon dioxide per dwelling.
