= Horton-cum-Studley =

Village in Oxfordshire, England

Coordinates: 51.806°N 1.131°W

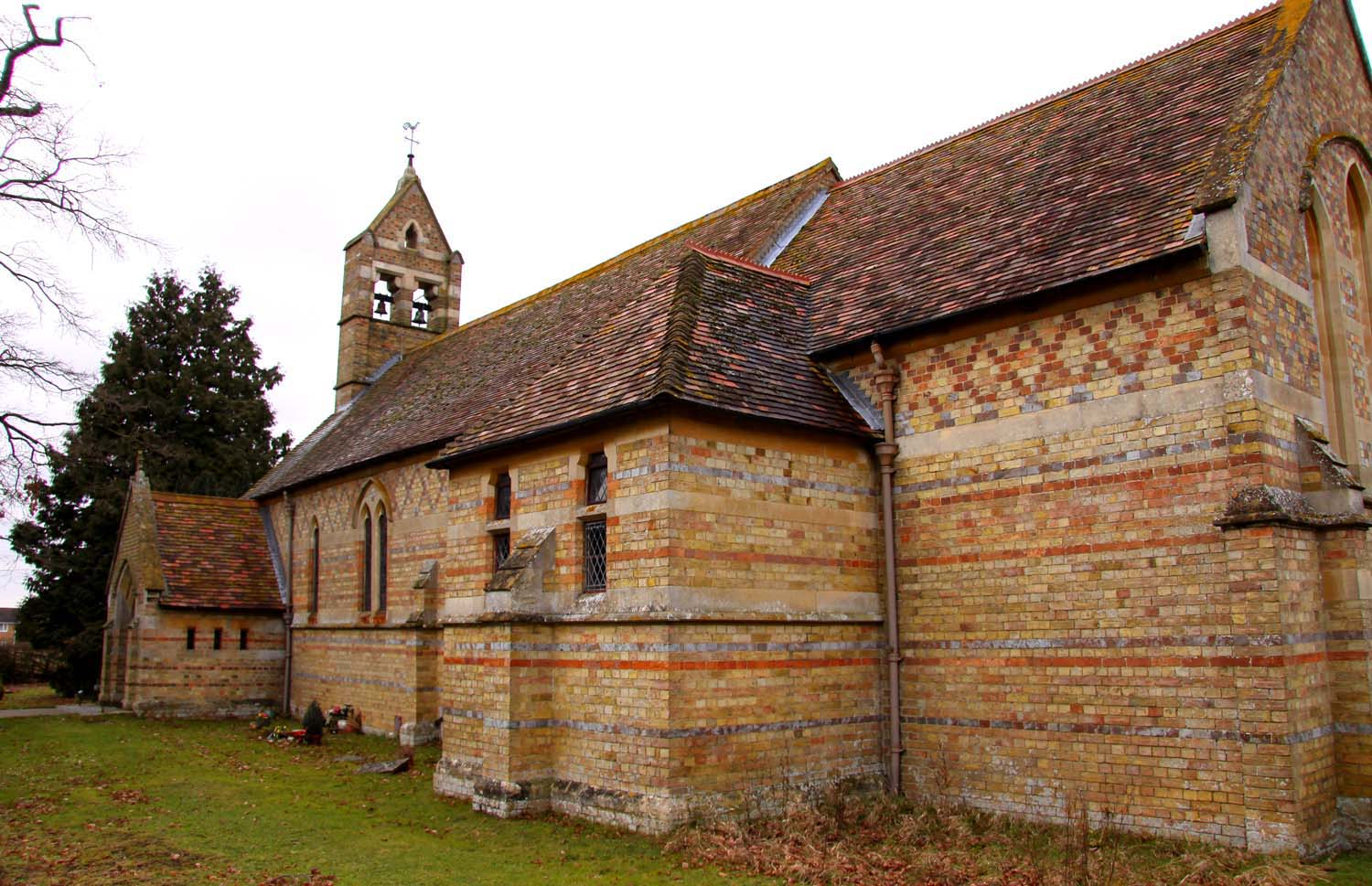
- St Barnabas Church, Horton-cum-Studley

- Location within Oxfordshire
- Area: 9.04 km^{2} (3.49 sq mi)
- Population: 455 (2011 census)
  - Density: 50/km^{2} (130/sq mi)
- OS grid reference: SP5912
- Civil parish: Horton-cum-Studley
- District: Cherwell
- Shire county: Oxfordshire
- Region: South East
- Country: England
- Sovereign state: United Kingdom
- Post town: OXFORD
- Postcode district: OX33
- Dialling code: 01865
- Police: Thames Valley
- Fire: Oxfordshire
- Ambulance: South Central
- UK Parliament: Bicester and Woodstock
- Website: Horton-cum-Studley

Horton-cum-Studley is a village and civil parish in the Cherwell district, in Oxfordshire, England, about 6 1/2 miles (10.5 km) northeast of the centre of Oxford and bordering Otmoor, and is one of the "Seven Towns" of Otmoor. The 2011 census recorded the parish's population as 455. A majority of residents in the village work in the Healthcare and Educational Sectors.

== Civil parish ==
The hamlet of Studley was originally in two parts: one in Oxfordshire and the other in the Hundred of Ashendon in Buckinghamshire. Horton was always part of Oxfordshire. Horton and all of Studley, including the Buckinghamshire part, were originally part of the ancient parish of Beckley. The Buckinghamshire part of Studley became a separate civil parish, but was then transferred to Oxfordshire under the Reform Act 1832 and the Counties (Detached Parts) Act 1844. Meanwhile, Horton and the Oxfordshire part of Studley had been separated from Beckley to form the civil parish of Horton-cum-Studley. The two parts of Studley were reunited in 1932, when the Studley and Horton-cum-Studley civil parishes were finally merged.

== Manors and priory ==
=== Horton ===
Horton's toponym is derived from Old English horu 'dirt' and tūn 'settlement, farm, estate', presumably meaning 'farm on muddy soil'. The oldest known record of Horton is from the reign of Æthelred the Unready: a charter of 1005-11 that records its agricultural land as five hides. However, the Domesday Book of 1086 has no separate entry for Horton as it had been part of the manor of Beckley since before the Norman Conquest of England. Until the Norman conquest of England the manor of Beckley was one of many that belonged to Saxon Wigod, thegn of Wallingford. Thereafter ownership of Horton followed the same descent as that of Beckley.

After the Norman Conquest of England the Norman baron Robert D'Oyly acquired Wigod's estates by marriage and then passed a number of them to his brother-in-arms Roger d'Ivry. Beckley and Horton became part of the Honour of St Valery in the 12th century, were held by the Earls of Cornwall in the 13th century, Hugh le Despenser and then The Black Prince in the 14th century and the Crown in the 15th century. Beckley and Horton passed from Princess Elizabeth via Sir Walter Mildmay in 1550 to Sir John Williams, whose descendants were titled Baron Norreys from 1572 and Earl of Abingdon from 1682. Beckley and Horton were broken up into lots and sold by Viscount Bertie, son of Montagu Bertie, 7th Earl of Abingdon, in 1919.

=== Ash ===
Before the Norman Conquest a man called Azor son of Toti, who held allegiance to Edith of Wessex, consort of Edward the Confessor, held the manor of Lesa or Ash. Azor also had the manors of Iffley in Oxfordshire and Lillingstone Lovell in Buckinghamshire, and other Oxfordshire landholdings at Chastleton and Marsh Baldon. The Domesday Book in 1086 recorded that Roger d'Ivry held the manor, which was assessed at two hides. Ash followed the same descent as Beckley and Horton until 1300, when they were estates of the Honour of St Valery. By 1190 the tenants of the Honour of St Valery at Ash were the Ash and De Bosco families.

Between 1190 and 1213 the two families granted land at either Ash or Marlake (see below) to the Knights Templar. The Order may have disposed of the land before its dissolution in the 14th century, as the Hundred Rolls for the Hundred of Bullingdon for 1279 do not record any Templar landholding in Beckley parish. In 1361 John of Ash enfeoffed John and Margaret Appleby, the lord and lady of Boarstall. In 1365 the Applebys granted Ash to trustees, who in turn enfeoffed the manor to a second set of trustees. In 1389 the latter trustees were licensed to alienate Ash to the Prioress of Studley. John Appleby died in 1371 and Margaret quitclaimed her rights in 1391.

=== Studley ===
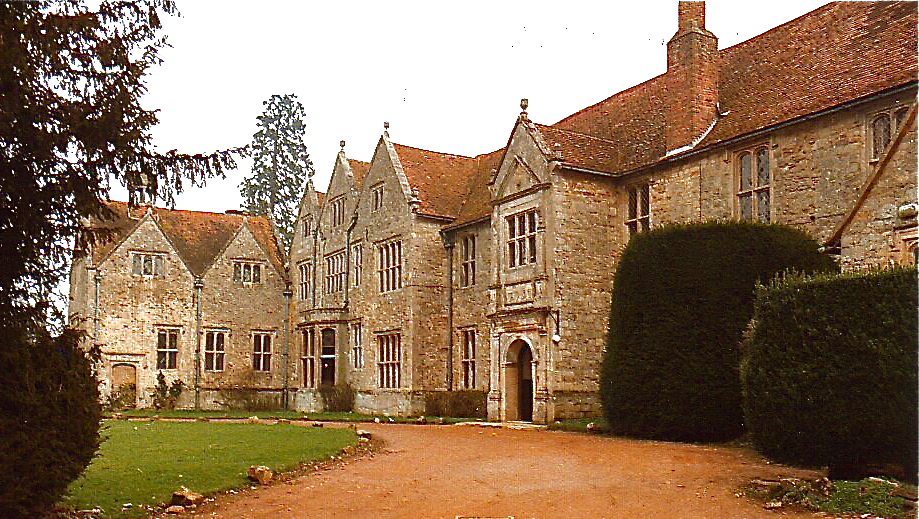
Studley Priory

The founding date of the Benedictine Studley Priory is not known, but earliest known record of its existence is from 1176, when Bernard de St Valery granted half a hide of land at Horton to the priory. Studley's toponym is derived from Old English meaning "pasture for horses". The priory's foundation led to the abandonment of Ash in favour of a new hamlet of Studley that grew up next to the priory. At one time the priory had 50 nuns but by 1445 their number had fallen to nine. In 1520 there were still only 10 nuns and the priory to be significantly in debt. In 1530 the debt was £60 and the buildings were in disrepair. Under the dissolution of the monasteries Studley Priory surrendered its lands to the Crown in November 1539, which sold them off in February 1540. John Croke bought the priory's lands at Studley and Horton.

In 1621 another Sir John Croke sold Studley to George Croke, who was a lawyer and in the 1630s defended John Hampden in the ship money case. Sir George died in 1642, leaving his estates to his wife for the remainder of her life, with reversion to their son Thomas and thence to other members of their immediate family. Thomas Croke was a Royalist in the English Civil War so Parliament sequestered his estates in 1644, but they were discharged in 1646. Sir Alexander Croke (1758–1842) succeeded to the estate in 1777. Alexander became a maritime lawyer and was the senior justice of the vice admiralty courts of Nova Scotia from 1801: a term of office that included the War of 1812 against the USA. Sir Alexander also wrote satirical verse, many letters and a genealogy of his family. In 1877 Sir Alexander's younger son John Croke sold Studley to John Henderson. In 1953 Studley was still in his family, with his grandson Captain John Henderson being lord of the manor.

=== Marlake ===
Before the English Reformation the Preceptory of the Knights Hospitaller at Sandford-on-Thames held land at Marlake. The Order was suppressed in England under Henry VIII and the Crown seized all its property. John Croke, who had bought Studley Priory's lands in 1542, bought the former Hospitaller estate at Marlake in 1542. In 1877 the Crokes sold Marlake and Studley to John Henderson. Building of the country house called Studley Priory began in the 16th century. The house's plan is irregular, which suggests that parts of the Benedictine priory buildings were absorbed into it. The house had been converted into a hotel by 1953 but ceased to be so in 2004.

== Chapels and church ==
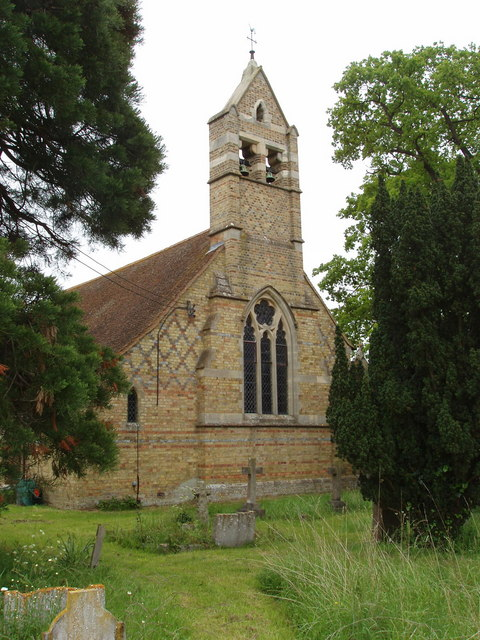
St Barnabas' parish church

Horton and Studley are more than 2 1/2 miles (4 km) from the church of their ancient parish of Beckley. There is an isolated record of a chaplain serving Horton in the 13th century, but no subsequent records for about the next 300 years. However, there is a record from 1553 of a chapel at Horton that had clearly been there for some time. About 1639 Sir George Croke had the north wing of Studley Priory converted into a chapel. The old village chapel was allowed to fall into disrepair and by 1685 it had fallen down. Villagers worshipped at the new Priory chapel, and the residents of the almshouses (see below) were duty bound to do so or else half of their weekly allowance would be stopped.

The Church of England parish church of Saint Barnabas was built in 1867, apparently on or close to the site of the former village chapel. This made the Priory chapel unnecessary, so when the Croke family sold Studley to John Henderson in 1877 the chapel was converted into a kitchen and offices. The present St Barnabas' parish church was designed by the Gothic Revival architect William Butterfield and built in 1867. It is built of yellow brick relieved by red and blue brick detailing. It has a nave, chancel and north aisle. St Barnabas' has no tower but there is a west bell-turret with two bells. The stained glass windows are by Alexander Gibbs. Early in the 19th century there were a number of Protestant Nonconformists in Horton and Studley, and some of their homes were licensed for them to worship in. The Methodist chapel was built in 1878.

== Economic and social history ==
Studley had a windmill by 1539, when it was listed among the estates of the priory that had just been dissolved and sold to John Croke. It was recorded on maps in the 17th and 18th centuries and finally on the parish of Beckley's inclosure maps of 1827–31. Its site is recorded by the name Mill Field, at the end of Mill Lane. Sir George Croke established the Studley Almshouse Charity in 1631 by an indenture that gave it an income from land at Easington, Buckinghamshire. The houses were built in 1639 for four local men over 60 years of age and four local women over 50 "well reputed for religion, and of good character and conversation". A further endowment to the charity was added by Sir Richard Ingoldsby, Lady Elizabeth Ingoldsby and Alexander Croke in 1668. The Otmoor Inclosure Award of 1825 added two acres and eight perches to the charity's endowment. The number of beneficiaries was reduced to two men and two women in 1880.

In June 1643 during the English Civil War a force of 500 of Prince Rupert's cavalry reconnoitred Horton, unsuccessfully searching for an advancing force under the Earl of Essex. A few days later Essex advanced and unsuccessfully attacked Islip. After Essex withdrew, a Royalist force from Woodperry returned and drove the sheep off Horton Common. By 1819 Horton had a schoolmaster and by 1833 it had two small schools. In 1871 there were still two schools, but one had a charitable endowment and had 47 pupils. In 1891 the larger school came under the Church of England parish and had 59 pupils. It was still open in 1952 but by then had only 20 pupils. It has since closed. Horton had a post office in 1954 but it closed in October 2004.

=== Inclosures ===
A map of 1641 shows that by then inclosure had embraced at least two thirds of the Manor of Studley: 670 acres (270 ha). This included only a small proportion of the land around the manor house but a much larger proportion of the land of the former hamlets of Ash and Marlake. Studley Mill Field continued to be cultivated under an open field system. By 1786 Horton had no large inclosures but about 150 small ones covering a total of 90 acres (36 ha). A further 460 acres (190 ha) continued to be worked as common fields. West Farm at Horton was built in the 17th century. In 1829 Otmoor was inclosed and some of its land was added to the parish of Beckley, including 262 acres (106 ha) for Horton and 200 acres (81 ha) for Studley. In 1831 the parish of Beckley itself was inclosed.

== Amenities ==
Horton-cum-Studley has a public house, formerly known as the Kings Arms, now trading as The Otmoor Lodge Hotel Bar Restaurant. It also has a village hall, the Millennium Hall. There is a Studley Women's Institute and a Horton-cum-Studley Tennis Club. There are regular village events held in the Millennium Hall.

== General and cited references ==
- Lobel, Mary D., ed. (1957). A History of the County of Oxford. Victoria County History. Vol. 5: Bullingdon Hundred. London: Oxford University Press for the Institute of Historical Research. pp. 56–76.
- Page, W.H., ed. (1907). A History of the County of Oxford. Victoria County History. Vol. 2: Ecclesiastical History, etc. Westminster: Archibald Constable & Co. pp. 77–79.
- Sherwood, Jennifer; Pevsner, Nikolaus (1974). Oxfordshire. The Buildings of England. Harmondsworth: Penguin Books. pp. 656–657. ISBN 0-14-071045-0.
- Watts, Victor, ed. (2004). "Horton". The Cambridge Dictionary of English Place-Names: Based on the Collections of the English Place-Name Society. Cambridge: Cambridge University Press. ISBN 0521168554.
