= Vale of White Horse =

Coordinates: 51.6°N 1.5°W

Vale of White Horse Vale of White Horse District
- Non-metropolitan district
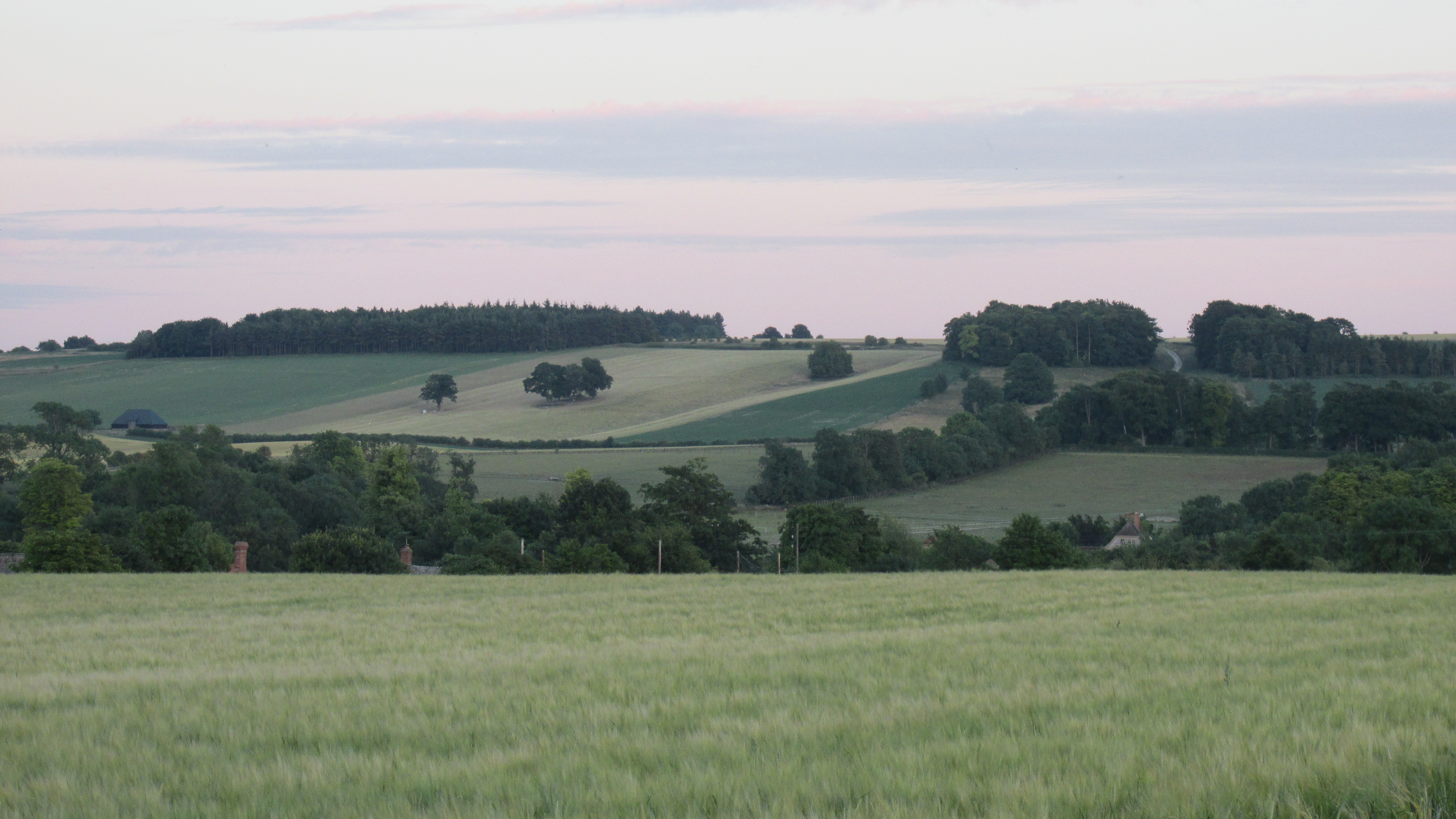
- Characteristic landscape of farmland, hills and woodlands

- Vale of White Horse shown within Oxfordshire
- Sovereign state: United Kingdom
- Constituent country: England
- Region: South East England
- Non-metropolitan county: Oxfordshire
- Historic county: Berkshire
- Status: Non-metropolitan district
- Admin HQ: Milton, Vale of White Horse
- Incorporated: 1 April 1974; 52 years ago

Government
  - Type: Non-metropolitan district council
  - Body: Vale of White Horse District Council
  - Executive: Liberal Democrat
  - MPs: Olly Glover; Layla Moran; Charlie Maynard

Area
  - Total: 223.4 sq mi (578.6 km^{2})
  - Rank: 65th (of 296)

Population (2024)
  - Total: 149,347
  - Rank: 153rd (of 296)
  - Density: 668.5/sq mi (258.1/km^{2})

Ethnicity (2021)
  - Ethnic groups: List: 90.8% White; 4% Asian; 2.5% Mixed; 1.7% Black; 1.1% other

Religion (2021)
  - Religion: List: 48.6% Christianity; 41.7% no religion; 6.1% not stated; 1.4% Islam; 0.9% Hinduism; 0.5% Buddhism; 0.5% other; 0.2% Judaism; 0.2% Sikhism
- Time zone: UTC0 (GMT)
  - Summer (DST): UTC+1 (BST)
- ONS code: 38UE (ONS); E07000180 (GSS)
- OS grid reference: SU3462689188
- Website: www.whitehorsedc.gov.uk

The Vale of White Horse is a local government district of Oxfordshire in England. It was historically part of Berkshire. It is crossed by the Ridgeway National Trail in its far south, across the North Wessex Downs AONB at the junction of four counties. The northern boundary is defined by the River Thames. The name refers to Uffington White Horse, a prehistoric hill figure.

As well as being a local authority district, the Vale of White Horse is a geographical, historical and cultural region. The name "Vale of White Horse" predates the present-day local authority district, having been described, for example, in Daniel Defoe's 1748 travel account A Tour thro' the Whole Island of Great Britain. There are references to the name as early as the 17th century; the Elizabethan antiquarian and historian William Camden referred to the "Vale of White Horse" in his 1610 topographical study on the British Isles. Traditionally, the Vale has been understood to cover an area wider than the present-day local authority district, stretching from Buscot, in the west, to Streatley, in the east. The Vale and Downland Museum, based in Wantage, stores and presents the cultural heritage of the region.

== History ==
=== Establishment ===
The area has been long settled as a productive fertile chalklands above well-drained clay valleys, and well-farmed with many small woodlands and hills between the Berkshire Downs and the River Thames on its north and east sides. It is named after the prominent and large Bronze Age-founded Uffington White Horse hill figure.

The local government district was formed as part of the 1974 re-organisation, taking in three small Berkshire towns – in descending size order Abingdon, Faringdon and Wantage – and the surrounding rural parishes. There are 68 parishes in the district. Previously, since the 19th century, the administrative areas had been the Municipal Borough of Abingdon, Wantage Urban District, Abingdon Rural District, Faringdon Rural District, and most of Wantage Rural District.

=== Possible merger ===
Under current local government reorganisation plans, all district councils in Oxfordshire, as well as the county council, would be abolished in 2028. Part of the district near Oxford would become part of a Greater Oxford unitary authority, while the rest would become part of a new Ridgeway unitary authority along with most of the fellow Oxfordshire district South Oxfordshire and the existing West Berkshire unitary. However, on 7 September 2026, the government announced that a number of ongoing local government reorganisations, including the one affecting Vale of White Horse, would be paused until the decision is "reviewed". Planned elections to the shadow authority will now not go ahead next year, with Vale of White Horse Council elections taking place instead. It is not clear whether and when the proposed changes will go ahead.

== Politics ==
The Vale of White Horse District Council is based in Milton Park, Milton. The council has been controlled by either Liberal Democrat or Conservative administrations since Vale of White Horse was created in 1973. The council was run by the Conservative Party from 2011 until the 2019 UK local elections, at which the Liberal Democrats regained control in a landslide, after having previously held the council from 1995 to 2011.

== Geography ==
The Vale is the valley of the Ock, a stream which joins the Thames from the west at Abingdon. It is almost flat and well wooded, its green meadows and foliage contrasting richly with the bald summits of the Berkshire Downs, which flank it on the south. The numerous elm trees that once were a major feature of the Vale were lost to Dutch Elm Disease. To the north, a low ridge separates it from the upper Thames Valley, holding back the soft Jurassic sedimentary and Cretaceous deposits (Greensand, Gault and Kimmeridge Clay) behind a hard corallian limestone escarpment ridge, in what is technically a hanging valley; but local usage sometimes extends the vale to cover all the ground between the Cotswolds (on the north) and the Berkshire Downs. According to the geographical definition, however, the Vale is from two to five miles wide, and the distance by road from Abingdon to Shrivenham at its head is 18 miles.

Wantage is the only town in the foot or slopes of the vale (Faringdon, on the northwestern rim, is closely associated). Wantage is in a sheltered hollow at the foot of the hills, along which villages concentrate often in long strip parishes. Numerous springs, the run-off from the chalk hills were main local water sources, and an accessible water table enabled the growing of fruits, grains and vegetables.

== Sites of interest ==
=== White Horse Hill ===
Towards the west, above Uffington, the hills reach a culminating point of 261 m (856 ft) in White Horse Hill. In its northern flank, just below the summit, a gigantic figure of a horse is cut, consisting of deep trenches filled with crushed white chalk. This figure gives name to the hill, the range and the Vale. It is 114 m (374 ft) long and highly stylised, the neck, body and tail varying little in width.

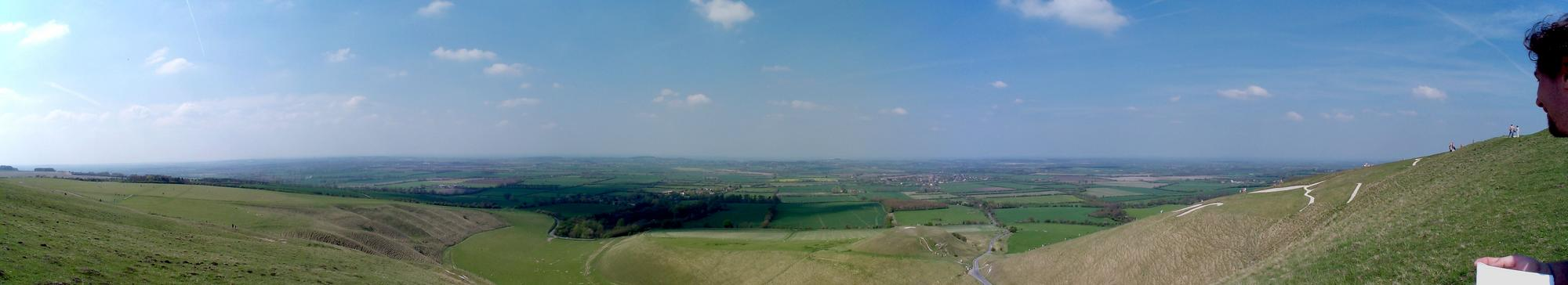
A panoramic view into the Vale; the White Horse is on the right and Dragon Hill centre right

The origin of the figure is unknown. Tradition asserted it to be the monument of a victory over the Danes by King Alfred, who was born at Wantage, but the site of the Battle of Ashdown (871 CE) has been variously located. Moreover, the figure has been dated to the Bronze Age, so it pre-dates the battle by many centuries. Many ancient remains occur in the vicinity of the Horse.

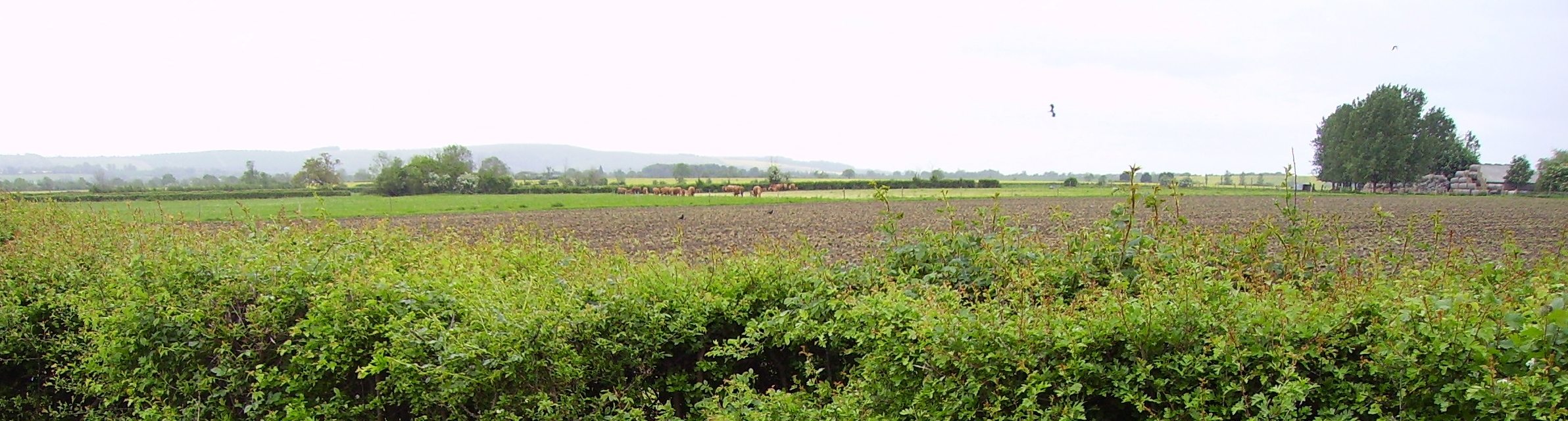
Vale scene, with White Horse Hill on the horizon

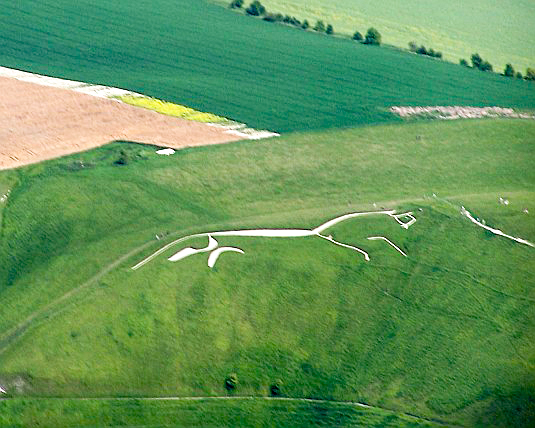
The Uffington White Horse, as seen from an altitude of about 600 m (2000 ft), from the cockpit of a glider

On the summit of the hill there is an extensive and well-preserved circular camp, apparently used by the Romans but of much earlier origin. It is an Iron Age hill fort named Uffington Castle, after the village in the vale below. Within a short distance are Hardwell Castle, a near-square work and, on the southern slope of the hills near Ashdown House, a small camp traditionally called Alfred's Castle. Further to the West, there is Liddington Castle.

A smooth, steep gully on the north flank of White Horse Hill is called the Manger, and to the west of it rises a bald mound named Dragon Hill, the traditional scene of St George's victory over the dragon, the blood of which made the ground bare of grass for ever. But the name may derive from Celtic Pendragon ("dragon's head"), which was a title for a king, and may point to an early place of burial.

The Vale as a whole appears at the beginning of Tom Brown's Schooldays, as the scene of innocent Saxon boyhood adventures, before the eponymous hero is sent away to school at Rugby. Rosemary Sutcliff's 1977 historical novel Sun Horse, Moon Horse takes place in the Vale, telling the tale of the White Horse's creation in ancient Celtic times.

=== Waylands Smithy ===
To the west of White Horse Hill lies a long barrow called Wayland's Smithy, said to be the home of a smith who was never seen, but who shod the horses of travellers if they were left at the place with payment. The legend is elaborated, and the smith appears as a character, in Sir Walter Scott's novel Kenilworth, and in Rudyard Kipling's Puck of Pook's Hill.

== The Ridgeway ==
A grassy track represents the Ridgeway, claimed as the oldest road in Europe, perhaps five thousand years old or more. It travels along the crest of the hills, far above what would then have been marshy lowlands or forests, continuing Icknield Street, from the Chilterns to Goring and Streatley on the River Thames. It links The Wash and Salisbury Plain, and would have been an important artery for trade.

Other earthworks, in addition to those near the White Horse, overlook the Vale, such as Letcombe Castle (also known as Segsbury Camp) above Wantage. At the foot of the hills, not far east of the Horse, is preserved the so-called Blowing Stone of Kingston Lisle, a mass of sandstone (a sarsen) pierced with holes in such a way that, when blown like a trumpet, it produces a loud note. It is believed that, in earlier times, the stone served the purpose of a bugle.

Several of the village churches in the Vale are of interest, notably the fine Early English cruciform building at Uffington, that has an octagonal tower and is known as The Cathedral of the Vale.

== Economy ==
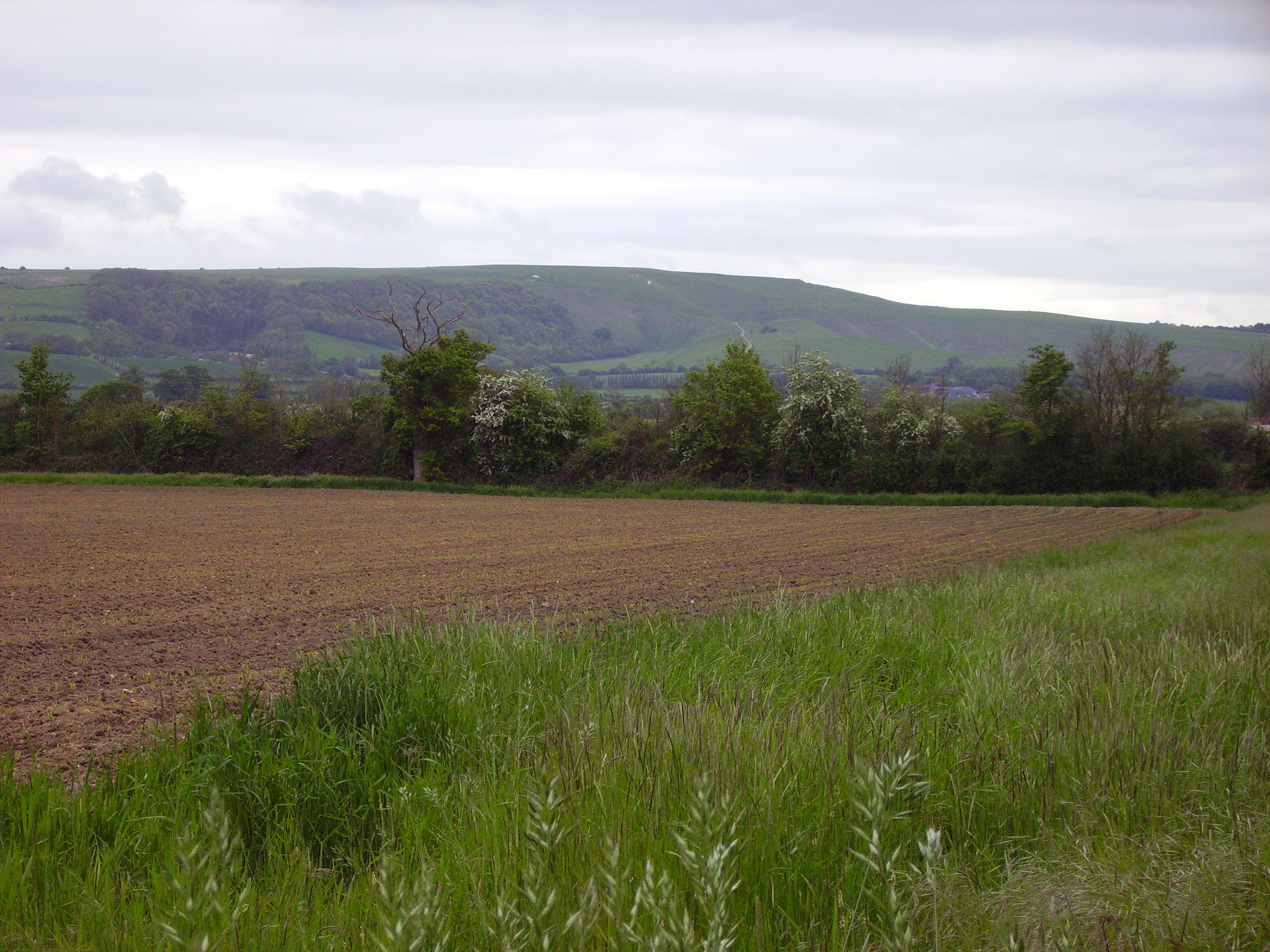
Farmland and White Horse Hill

Farming is mostly arable. In livestock the range is mixed. The area had a large dairy industry, especially in the 1960s, but it was much reduced by the 21st century, with the large fertile fields supported by subsidies. The Lockinge Estate is a longstanding agricultural employer within the region.

Natural mineral resources are mined (quarried) in the Vale. These include sand, gravel and (formerly) Fuller's Earth.

With the closure of British Leyland's long-established MG works at Abingdon in 1980, there is no motor industry, apart from some specialist car makers and component factories. Macdermid Autotype in Wantage remains one of the few large industrial employers in the region.

The length of the Vale is traversed by the Great Western Main Line and the Cherwell Valley Line. Appleford railway station and Radley railway station are now the only stations within the Vale, although there used to be stations at Challow, Uffington, Grove (near Wantage), Abingdon and Steventon. These all closed as part of the Beeching cuts, in the early 1960s. The nearest mainline stations are now Swindon, Oxford and Didcot Parkway.

The Harwell Science and Innovation Campus is a large employer, particularly for scientists and engineers.

At one time Amey plc had its head office in Sutton Courtenay, Vale of White Horse.

== See also ==
- Vale and Downland Museum - local museum for the region.
- Vale of the Red Horse – another vale of a similar name that once carried some 1, 2, 3, 4 or 5 hill figures of a horse.
- Vale of White Horse Hunt - fox hunting pack named after the region.
