= Charles Saxton =

Charles or Charlie Saxton may refer to:

- Charles T. Saxton (1846–1903), lieutenant-governor of New York
- Charlie Saxton (sportsman) (1913–2001), New Zealand rugby union and cricket player
- Charlie Saxton (born 1989), American actor
- Sir Charles Saxton, 1st Baronet (1732–1808), Royal Navy officer
- Sir Charles Saxton, 2nd Baronet (1773–1838), MP for Malmesbury
