= Kingston Lisle Park =

- Location within Oxfordshire
- Former names: Kingston Lisle House

General information
- Status: Grade II*
- Type: Country house
- Architectural style: Georgian
- Location: Kingston Lisle, Vale of White Horse, Oxfordshire, England
- Coordinates: 51.5854°N 1.5302°W
- Construction started: 1677
- Owner: J C DeCaux

Listed Building – Grade II*
- Designated: 10 November 1952
- Reference no.: 1048722

Kingston Lisle Park is a Grade II* listed Georgian country house and estate in Kingston Lisle, near Wantage, in the Vale of White Horse district of Oxfordshire, England. The house dates from the 17th century and is surrounded by an estate of more than 1,000 acres of woods, farmland and gardens.

== History ==
There was a village on the site since at least the Middle Ages; the Domesday Book recorded 31 households in 1086.

There was a manor house on the site during the 13th century. In 1336, Alice de Lisle (granddaughter of Henry I FitzGerold) had a licence to impark 200 acres of woods and 100 acres of land, and the estate became the seat for the Barony of Lisle for two centuries.

In 1538, the estate was sold to William Hyde of Denchworth. Sir George Hyde likely built a Jacobean mansion on the site. Some Jacobean elements remain on different buildings on the estate. His grandson, Humphrey Hyde, commissioned the central block of the current mansion. A stone plaque at the rear indicates it dates from 1677. The date stone is also marked with, "GH," initials of George Hyde.

The mansion was sold to Abraham Atkins in 1749. Edwin Martin-Atkins (1778–1825) commissioned architect Richard Pace to add the wings in 1812.

The estate has been owned by the Lonsdale family since 1943, when banker Leo Lonsdale purchased it for £26,000.

The house passed down to Lonsdale's grandson Jamie Lonsdale. His former wife Laura, daughter of Sir Carron Greig, was a Lady-in-Waiting Diana, Princess of Wales. Diana would regularly bring Prince Harry to visit the estate. Diana was godmother to the Lonsdales' eldest daughter, Leonora.

The Duke and Duchess of Cambridge reportedly visited Kingston Lisle Park in 2011 to look for property, but a spokesman for the estate denied it was for sale.

== House and estate ==
The mansion is 17,643 square feet (1,639.1 m^{2}), including 14 bedrooms, eight bathrooms and five reception rooms. The estate encompasses more than 290 acres and has a swimming pool, tennis court, and areas for fishing and shooting.

In 2013, owner Jamie Lonsdale put the 1,021-acre estate up for sale for £35 million. By March 2017 some 700 acres of the estate had been sold. In the spring of 2018, the house and surrounding 257 acres were sold to a European buyer, Alejandro Betancourt Lopez, for over £18 million. Extensive renovation plans have been submitted to the local authority for the estate, as outlined in planning documents which were given consent on 18 December 2019. (Ref: P19/V1412/FUL )
