= George Hyde (Knight of the Bath) =

Member of the Parliament of England

Sir George Hyde (c. 1570 – March/April 1623) was an English landowner, politician and Knight of the Order of the Bath.

Hyde was the eldest son of William Hyde (d. 1598) of South Denchworth in Berkshire (now Oxfordshire) and his wife Catherine daughter of George Gill of Wyddial in Hertfordshire. The family had been influential in Berkshire for centuries. He matriculated at The Queen's College, Oxford in 1586 and was a student at Gray's Inn in 1590.

He married Catherine, daughter of Sir Humphrey Ferrers of Tamworth Castle in 1594. Through the influence of his father-in-law he was MP for Tamworth in 1597.

In 1601 he sat as MP for Berkshire in 1601 as the junior member with his mother's second husband Sir Richard Lovelace. He became a Knight of the Bath at the coronation of James I in 1603. In 1617 he sold Denchworth to Sir William Cockayne and settled at Kingston Lisle Park in Berkshire (now Oxfordshire), which had been acquired by his grandfather.

He died in 1623, leaving his heir Humphrey (aged 23), 5 further sons and a daughter.
