= Clement Saxton =

- Born: 1724
- Died: 1810

Clement Saxton (1724–1810) was High Sheriff of Berkshire.

== Biography ==
Clement Saxton was born in 1724, the eldest son of Edward Saxton, a merchant of London and Abingdon, and his wife Mary, née Bush. The family's country estate was Circourt Manor at Denchworth in Berkshire (now Oxfordshire). He was educated at John Roysse's Free School in Abingdon, (now Abingdon School). His brother Charles became the 1st Baronet of the Saxton baronets in 1794.

Clement lived at Caldecott House in Abingdon. He was commissioned as a captain in the Berkshire Militia by 1762 and was promoted to lieutenant-colonel by 1779; he resigned on 28 August 1787. He was also appointed High Sheriff of Berkshire for 1777.

Political offices
Preceded by Henry Hall, of Cookham	High Sheriff of Berkshire; 1778-79	Succeeded by Richard Smith

== See also ==
- List of Old Abingdonians
