= Hanney =

Coordinates: 51°37′N 1°24′W

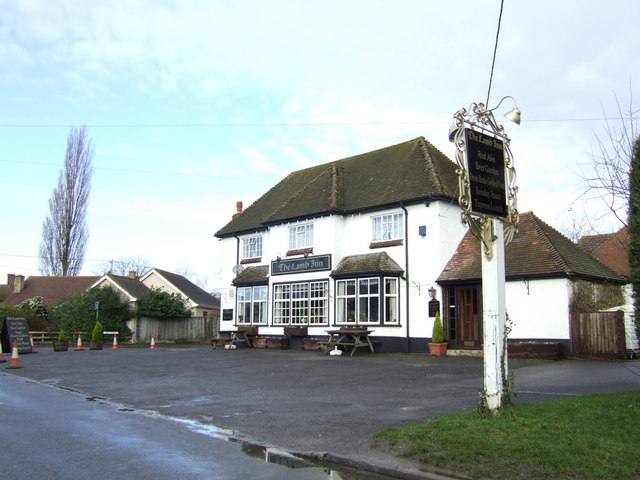
The Lamb Inn West Hanney, Oxfordshire.

Hanney was an ancient ecclesiastical parish about 3 miles (5 km) north of Wantage in the Vale of White Horse. It included the villages of East Hanney and West Hanney (known collectively as "The Hanneys") and Lyford. Hanney was part of Berkshire until the 1974 boundary changes transferred the Vale of White Horse to Oxfordshire.

== History ==
The villages were formerly islands in marshland, hence the Old English "-ey" ending of their toponyms. Charney Bassett, Childrey and Goosey are other nearby examples. The name, first recorded as Hannige in a charter in 956, likely meant "island of the wild birds", with the first part being an Old English word hana.

== Parish churches ==
The parish church of Saint James the Great, West Hanney was the mother church of the parish. The church of St. Mary, Lyford was built in the Middle Ages as a dependent chapel. East Hanney had a dependent chapel of St. James by 1288 but it was dissolved in the 16th century. A new chapel of St. James the Less was built in the 1850s but then made redundant in the 20th century.

== Sources ==
- Page, W.H.; Ditchfield, P.H., eds. (1924). A History of the County of Berkshire, Volume 4. Victoria County History. pp. 285–294.
- Pevsner, Nikolaus (1966). Berkshire. The Buildings of England. Harmondsworth: Penguin Books. p. 133.
