= Michael Angelo Camilleri =

Maltese priest (1814–1903)

The Reverend Michael Angelo Camilleri
- Vicar of Lyford
- Church: Church of England
- In office: 1863-1897

Orders
- Ordination: 1836 by Francesco Saverio Caruana

Personal details
- Born: February 15, 1814 Crown Colony of Malta
- Died: April 10, 1903 (aged 89) Weymouth, Dorset, England
- Buried: St Ann's Church, Radipole
- Denomination: Anglican (prev. Roman Catholic)
- Spouse: Emanuela Fleri (m. 1843; died 1845) Anne Parsley Clark (m. 1848)
- Education: University of Malta

Michael Angelo Camilleri (15 February 1814 – 10 April 1903) was a Maltese Anglican priest who is known for translating the Book of Common Prayer into the Maltese language in 1845.

== Education and Roman Catholic priesthood ==
Camilleri commenced theological studies at the theological college of the University of Malta in 1834. He was then ordained deacon and priest by Bishop Francesco Saverio Caruana in 1836 and awarded a Doctor of Divinity by the university in 1838. He was then appointed to several posts, ministering in both Malta and Algeria.

== Conversion to Anglicanism ==
Camilleri met Emanuela Fleri sometime before 1843. She was the widow of Publio Fleri with whom she had two children. They then eloped to Gibraltar. In June 1843 he was admitted to the Anglican priesthood by the Bishop of Gibraltar, George Tomlinson. The bishop officiated at the marriage of the couple on June 13, 1843.

== Return to Malta ==
Upon their return to Malta, Emanuela’s mother in law instituted a petition to the Royal Civil Courts in favour of undertaking the guardianship of Emanuel’s two children from her first husband in order for the children to be brought up in the Roman Catholic faith rather than the Anglicanism which their mother had converted to. The courts ruled in favour of the grandmother in 1844, with the courts of appeal upholding the ruling. It was when the marshal of the court and his assistant tried to enforce the order of the Court of Appeal on 18 June 1844, that is to remove the two children from their mother’s care, that a commotion arose between Camilleri and the court marshal which led to Camilleri being sentenced to 20 days imprisonment. However, through the intervention of the Bishop of Gibraltar, Camilleri was released after paying a fine of £1, 1s, 7d. Emanuela did not live long after the ordeal and died on 25 July 1845.

== Translation of the Book of Common Prayer into Maltese ==
Camilleri translated the Book of Common Prayer, the official prayer book of the Church of England, into the Maltese language. He embarked on this work in 1844 through the instigation of Bishop Tomlinson. The work was published as Ktieb it-Talb ta' Għalenija in June 1845 by the Society for Promoting Christian Knowledge. Camilleri also revised the four Gospels and Acts of the Apostles, which were initially translated by Mikiel Anton Vassalli, and published them as Il-Għaqda l-Ġdida ta' Sidna Ġesù Kristu in 1847. With the translation of the Book of Common Prayer, Camilleri also translated 40 psalms of David from the original Hebrew into Maltese, the first such translation.

== Missionary work in South Africa ==
On 14 September 1848, Camilleri married Anne Parsley Clark and shortly after departed for Cape Town to take up his post as missionary to the local Muslim community. He was also assigned to serve at St George’s Cathedral in Cape Town. He remained in South Africa until 1855, having resigned in 1854.

== Ministry in England and death ==
For a short time Camilleri was curate of St Michael's Church in Burleigh Street, London, before becoming curate of the parish church of St Denys in Stanford in the Vale, Berkshire, in 1858. He was then transferred to Lyford, Oxfordshire, in 1863 as vicar of the Church of St Mary the Virgin, where he remained until 1897. During this time he was also involved in the Anglo-Continental Society where he undertook a somewhat secretive mission in Italy. He retired to Weymouth, Dorset where he lived until his death on 10 April 1903. He was buried in the churchyard of St Ann's Church, Radipole.
