= Charney Manor =

13th-century manor house in Oxfordshire, England

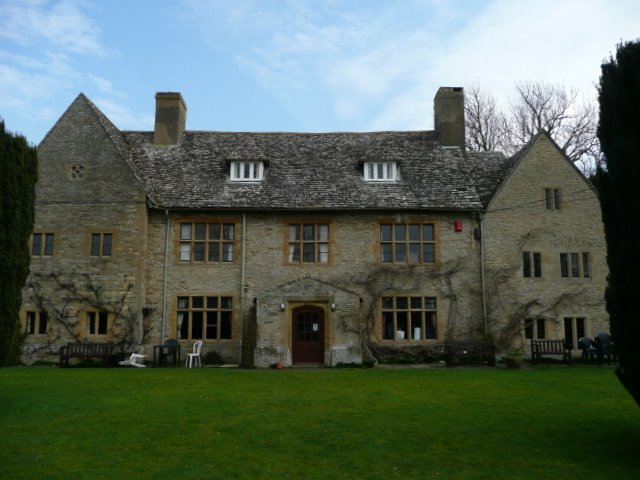
- Charney Manor
- Interactive map of the Charney Manor area

General information
- Type: Manor house
- Location: Charney Bassett, United Kingdom
- Coordinates: 51.6475°N 1.4508°W
- Opened: 13th century

Design and construction
- Designations: Grade I Listed

Website
- Charney Manor: Conference & Retreat Centre

Charney Manor is a 13th-century manor house at Charney Bassett now in the English county of Oxfordshire (but formerly in Berkshire). It is a grade I listed building.

Charney Manor was originally a grange of Abingdon Abbey. It was later rented out to the Yate family. It is currently a retreat and conference centre.
