= West Hanney =

Village in Oxfordshire, England

Coordinates: 51.633°N 1.415°W

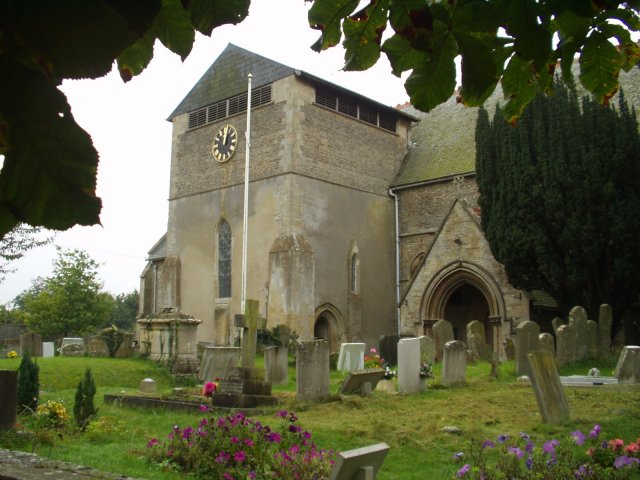
- St James the Great parish church

- Location within Oxfordshire
- Population: 490 (2011 Census)
- OS grid reference: SU4192
- Civil parish: East Hanney
- District: Vale of White Horse
- Shire county: Oxfordshire
- Region: South East
- Country: England
- Sovereign state: United Kingdom
- Post town: Wantage
- Postcode district: OX12
- Dialling code: 01235
- Police: Thames Valley
- Fire: Oxfordshire
- Ambulance: South Central
- UK Parliament: Didcot and Wantage
- Website: TheHanneys

West Hanney is a village and civil parish about 3 miles (5 km) north of Wantage, Oxfordshire, England. Historically West and East Hanney were formerly a single ecclesiastical parish of Hanney. West Hanney was part of Berkshire until the 1974 boundary changes transferred the Vale of White Horse to Oxfordshire. The 2011 Census recorded the parish's population as 490.

== Archaeology ==
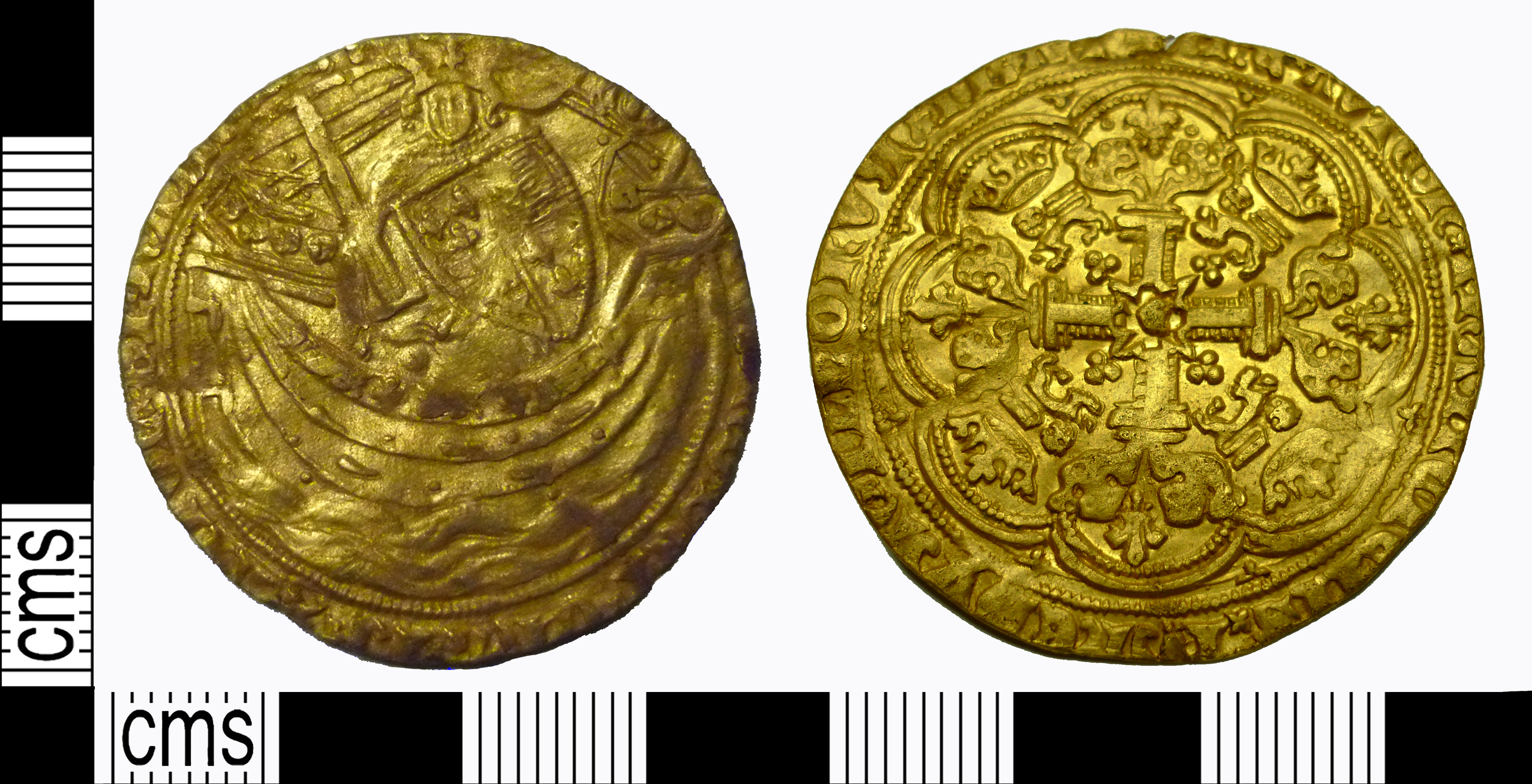
A gold noble coin of Edward III, dating from c. 1356 – c. 1361, found in West Hanney in 2010

In September 2009 a metal detecting club held its annual rally at a site in the parish. One detectorist found a Saxon grave from early in the 7th century containing the skeleton of a young woman with grave goods including one spindle whorl, two iron knives, and two ceramic pots that may have contained food. Near the grave the detectorist found an ornate circular Saxon metal brooch inlaid with gold, garnets and coral. This type of brooch was previously known from Kent, East Anglia, Essex and Bedfordshire. Still, the one from West Hanney is further west than all previously found examples, making it "a find described as of national importance". It has yet to be determined where the brooch may have been made. Also yet to be determined is whether the young woman belonged to the local Saxon Gewisse tribe. She was about 25 years old when she died, and shortly after her grave was discovered an osteologist said that her skeleton would be examined to try to determine her cause of death.

== Parish church ==
The village had a parish church by the Domesday Book in 1086. The earliest part of the present Church of England parish church of Saint James the Great is the nave, built about 1150. The north tower was added later in the 12th century and the south transept is 13th-century. In the 14th century, the nave was lengthened westward and the south arcade and aisle were added. The chancel was rebuilt in the 15th century. In the 19th century the church was restored, the nave was increased in height with a clerestory, and the south porch was added. The church is a Grade II* listed building.

The tower has a ring of six bells. Abraham I Rudhall of Gloucester cast five of them in 1702, but Charles and George Mears of the Whitechapel Bell Foundry cast the other in 1856. St. James' has a Sanctus bell that Robert I Wells of Aldbourne, Wiltshire cast in about 1760. There is another small bell that Charles and George Mears cast in 1858, but this is currently unused. The parish is now part of the Benefice of Vale and the parishes of Denchworth, East Challow and Grove. A Georgian rectory was completed in 1724. It is now West Hanney House.

== Amenities ==
West Hanney has a thatched, timber-framed pub, The Plough, which was probably built in the 17th century. It is a free house, and in June 2015 it was bought by a body of villagers, who had it refurbished as a community pub. West Hanney had another pub called The Lamb, which ceased trading in 2008. It reopened in 2011 as the Hanney Spice Indian restaurant and take-away.

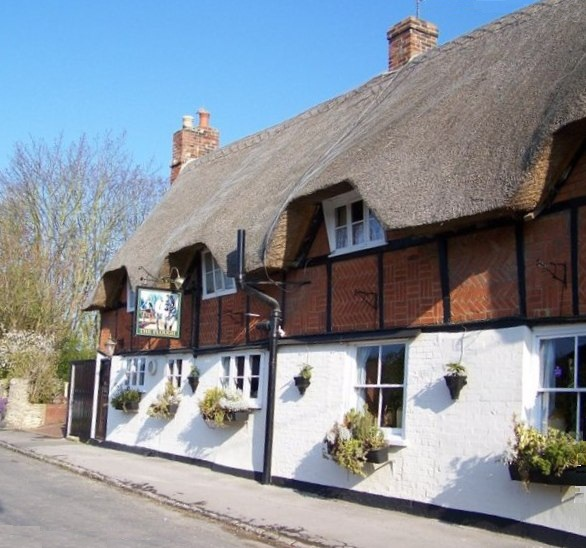
The Plough

== Sources ==
- Page, W.H.; Ditchfield, P.H., eds. (1924). A History of the County of Berkshire. Victoria County History. Vol. 4. assisted by John Hautenville Cope. London: The St Katherine Press. pp. 285–294.
- Pevsner, Nikolaus (1966). Berkshire. The Buildings of England. Harmondsworth: Penguin Books. pp. 293–294.
