= Lyford, Oxfordshire =

Village and civil parish in Vale, England

Coordinates: 51°38′46″N 1°26′06″W

Lyford
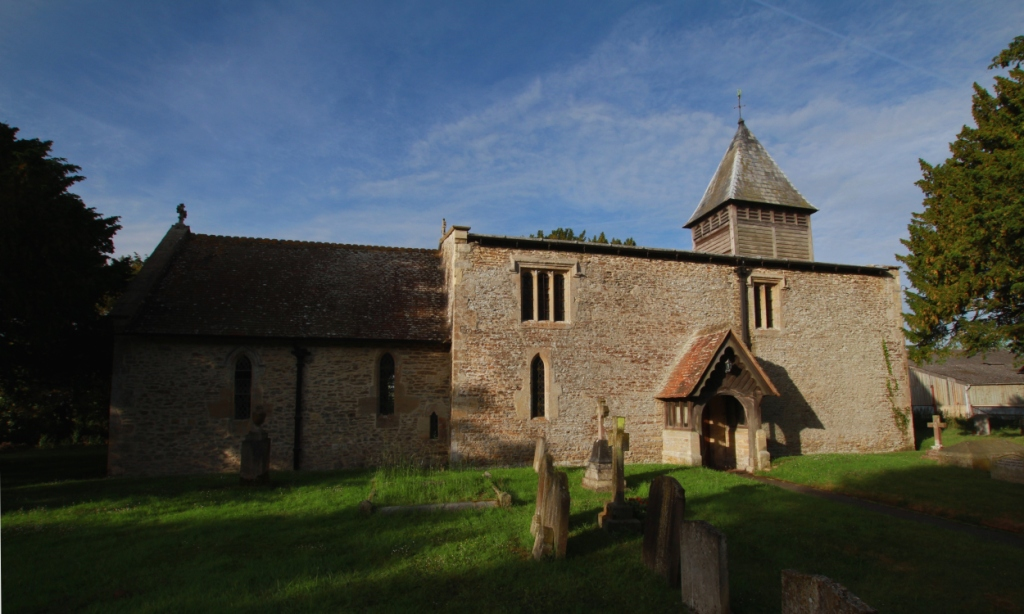
- St Mary the Virgin parish church, seen from the north

- Location within Oxfordshire
- Population: 44 (2001 Census)
- OS grid reference: SU3994
- Civil parish: Lyford
- District: Vale of White Horse
- Shire county: Oxfordshire
- Region: South East
- Country: England
- Sovereign state: United Kingdom
- Post town: Wantage
- Postcode district: OX12
- Police: Thames Valley
- Fire: Oxfordshire
- Ambulance: South Central
- UK Parliament: Witney

Lyford is a small village and civil parish on the River Ock about 4 miles (6 km) north of Wantage. Historically it was part of the ecclesiastical parish of Hanney. Lyford was part of Berkshire until the 1974 boundary changes transferred the Vale of White Horse to Oxfordshire. The 2001 Census recorded the parish's population as 44. Lyford's name refers to a former ford across the river Ock, now replaced with a bridge on the road to Charney Bassett. "Ly" is derived from the Old English lin, meaning "flax". In 1034 it was recorded as Linford.

== Manors ==
There were two manors in Lyford: Lyford Manor and Lyford Grange.

=== Lyford Manor ===
The manor of Lyford dates from at least 944, when Edmund I granted six hides of land there to one Ælfheah. The manor was enlarged by a grant of a further two hides of land by King Canute in 1034. The Domesday Book of 1086 records Lyford as Linford. The present manor house was built in the latter part of the 16th century and extended in 1617. It is a Grade II* listed building.

=== Lyford Grange ===
Lyford Grange, just east of the village, was originally a moated manor house of Abingdon Abbey built in a quadrangle. The present house was built between 1430 and 1480. It is timber-framed, with a post-and-truss roof including one queen post. It is a Grade II* listed building. In the reign of Elizabeth I the Grange belonged to a recusant family, the Yates, who harboured a community of Bridgettine nuns. In 1581 the house was searched; three priests were eventually found and arrested by the government agent, George Eliot: Thomas Ford, John Colleton and the renowned Jesuit, Edmund Campion. They were subsequently tried and martyred. The Mass is held annually in the village in commemoration of this event. The raid and martyrdoms did not stop recusancy at Lyford. In 1690 an informer reported that a small estate in the parish had been reserved to build a nunnery "when Popish times should come".

== Parish church ==
The Church of England parish church of St Mary the Virgin was built as a chapelry of Hanney in the first half of the 13th century. There is a Mass dial scratched on the south wall. The wooden bell-turret was added in the 15th century; it has a scissor-braced timber frame and three bells. The Perpendicular Gothic clerestory was added either at the same time or early in the 16th century. The church was restored in 1875 under the direction of the Gothic revival architect Ewan Christian. It is a Grade II* listed building. St Mary's parish is now part of the United Benefice of Cherbury with Gainfield. Rev. Michael Angelo Camilleri (1813–1903), sometime vicar of Lyford, translated the New Testament into Maltese.

== Social and economic history ==
Lyford Inclosure Act 1801
- Act of Parliament
- Parliament of the United Kingdom
- Long title: An Act for dividing and inclosing the Open and Common Fields, Common Pastures, Commons and Waste Lands, within the Hamlet of Lyford, in the Parish of Hanney, in the County of Berks.
- Citation: 41 Geo. 3. (U.K.) c. 83 Pr.

Dates
- Royal assent: 20 June 1801

In the early 1960s the digging of a soakaway in a cottage garden opposite the vicarage unearthed a small pottery bottle from the late 13th or early 14th century, and a bronze scale-pan. An open field system of farming continued in the parish until Parliament passed the Lyford Inclosure Act 1801 (41 Geo. 3. (U.K.) c. 83 Pr.).

=== Almshouses ===
Oliver Ashcombe founded Lyford almshouses in 1611. The present quadrangle of brick-built almshouses and a chapel appear to be 18th century. The quadrangle was completed as 20 houses, which were still tenanted as such in the early 1920s. More recently they have been combined into eight larger units.

== Air crash ==
On 8 April 1945 an Avro Lancaster B.I Special bomber aircraft, HK788 of No. 9 Squadron RAF based at Bardney in Lincolnshire, had taken part in a raid on a benzole factory in mainland Europe. On its return flight the plane caught fire and crashed in a field barely 400 yards (370 m) south of the parish church and Manor Farm. All seven aircrew were killed. Six were members of the Royal Air Force Volunteer Reserve. The seventh was a warrant officer from the Royal Canadian Air Force. All are buried in the Commonwealth War Graves section of Botley Cemetery on the outskirts of Oxford. Flight Sergeant Gordon Symonds, who was born and raised in Wantage, was killed just a couple of miles from his home. In October 2008 the widow of one of the crew provided a plaque commemorating the seven dead. It was installed in the parish church; the actor Richard Briers attended the ceremony and read Noël Coward's poem Lie in the Dark and Listen.

== See also ==
- Cowleaze Wood in southeast Oxfordshire, where an RAF Handley Page Halifax Mk III bomber aircraft crashed in 1944.

== Gallery ==
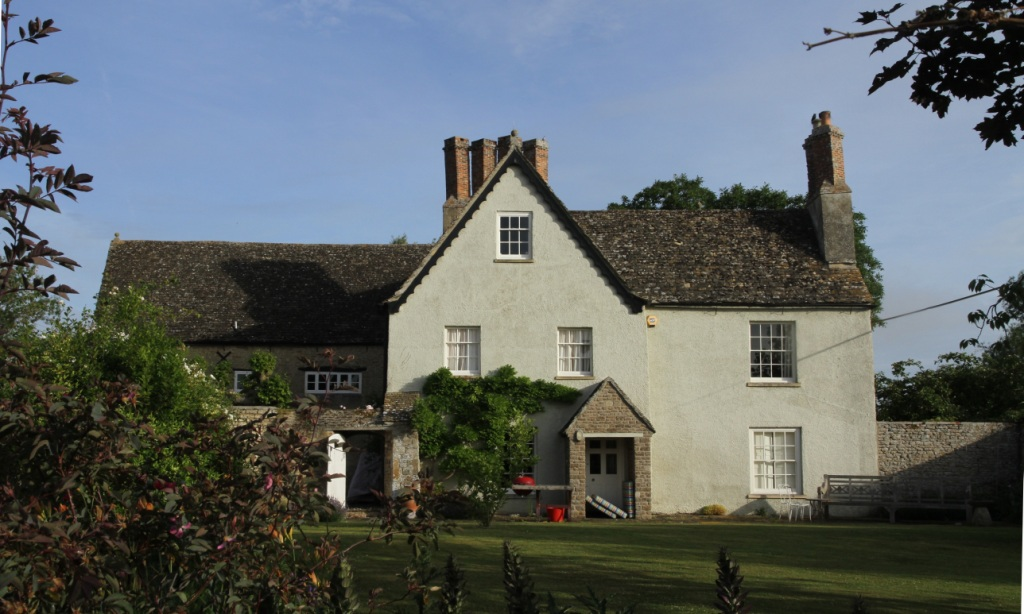
Lyford manor house

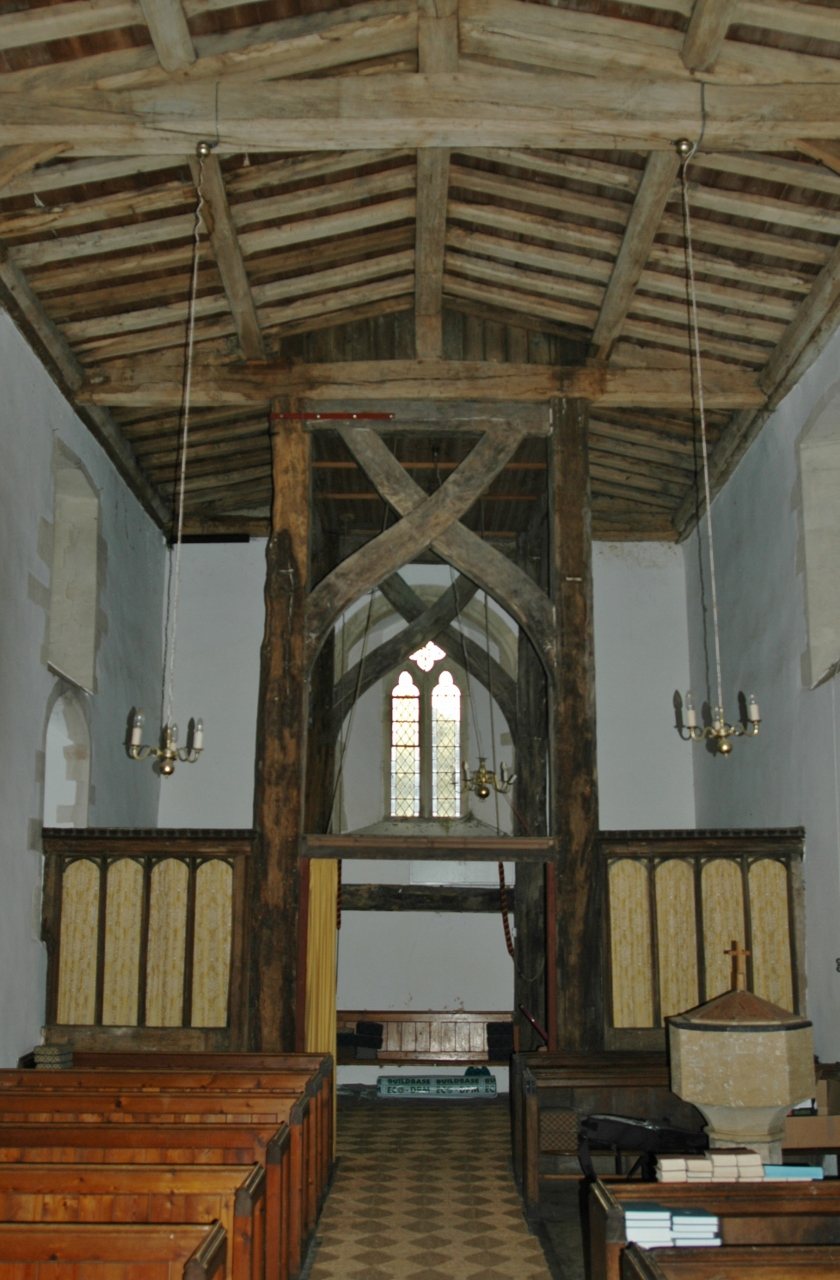
The west end of the nave in St Mary the Virgin parish church, showing the scissor-braced 15th-century frame supporting the bell-turret

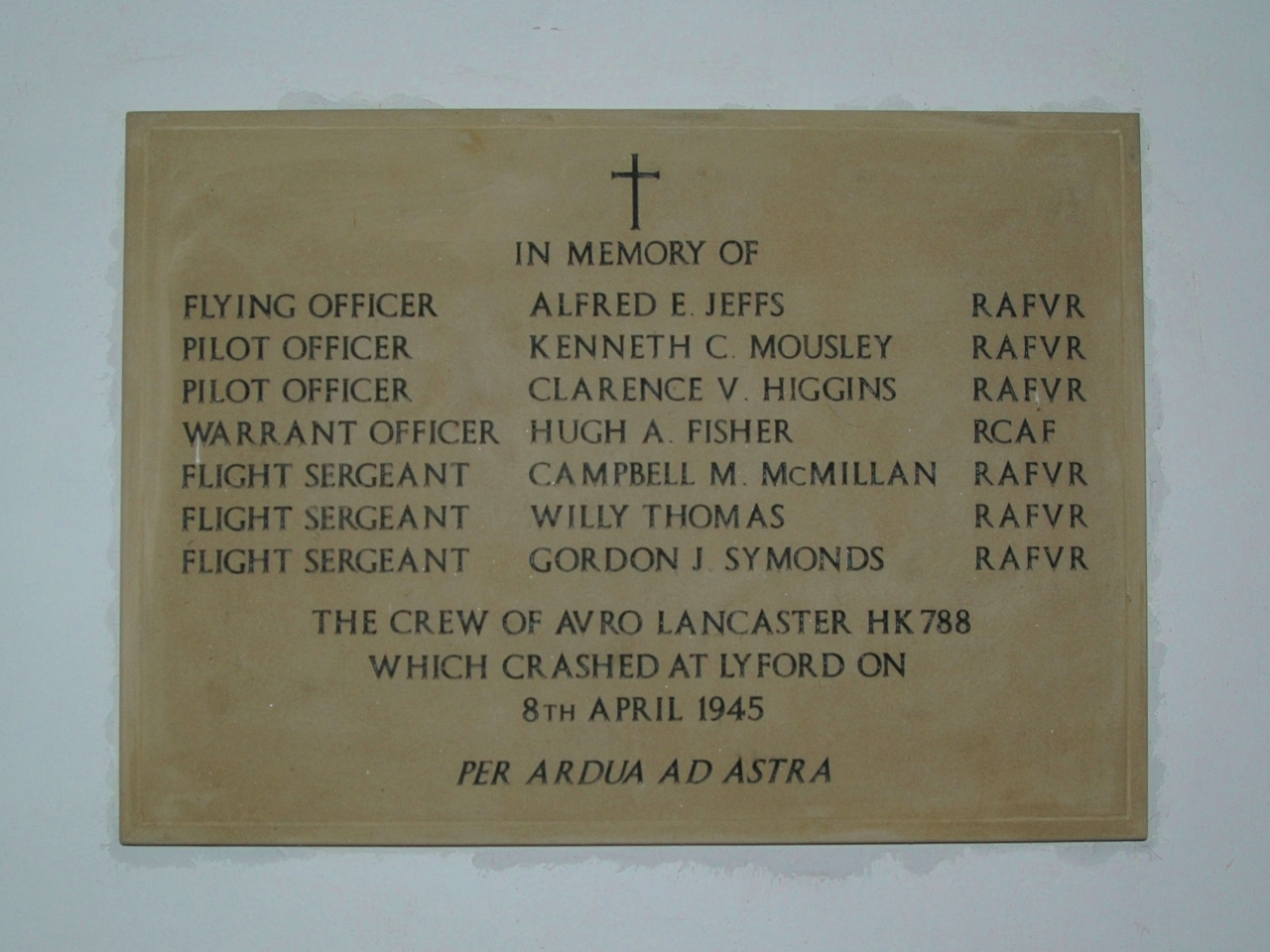
Monument in St Mary's parish church to the crew of RAF Lancaster HK788

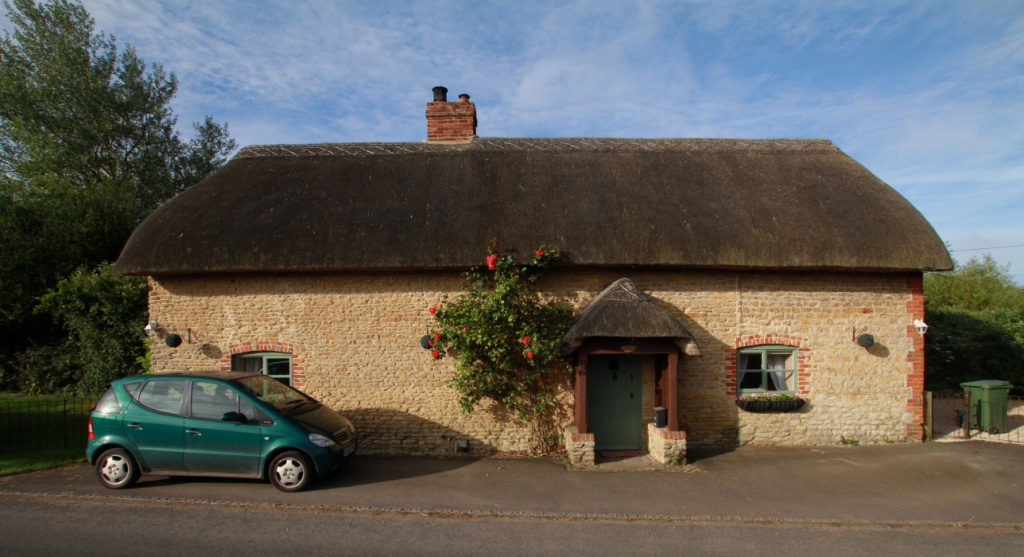
18th-century thatched cottage in Lyford

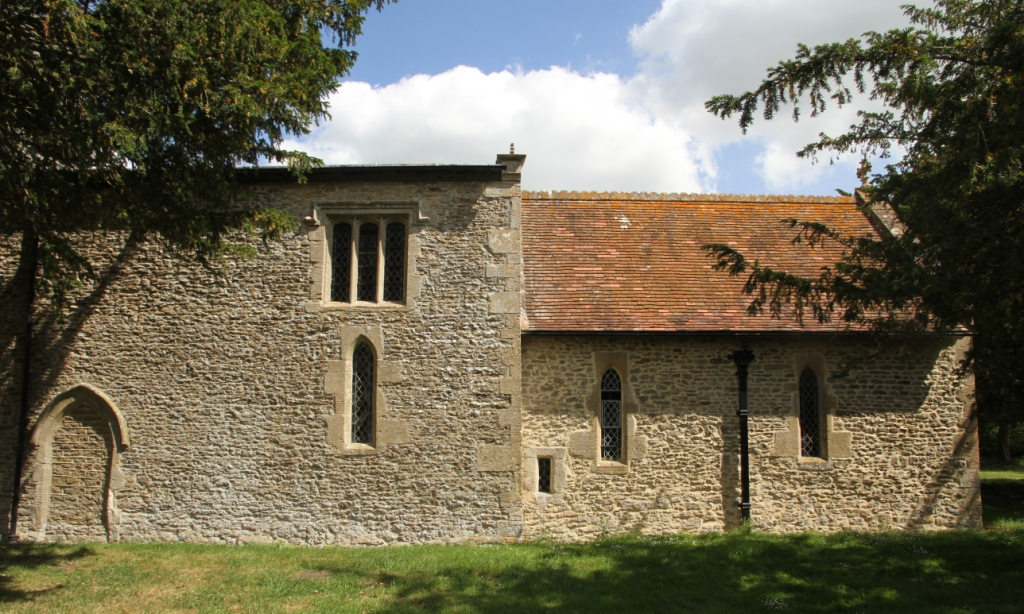
St Mary the Virgin parish church: the south side of the chancel (right) and part of the south side of the nave (left)

== Sources ==
- Arkell, WJ (1942). "Place-Names and Topography in the Upper Thames Country: A Regional Essay" (PDF). Oxoniensia. VII. Oxford Architectural and Historical Society: 6, 22. ISSN 0308-5562.
- Fletcher, John (1968). "Crucks In the West Berkshire and Oxford Region" (PDF). Oxoniensia. XXXIII. Oxford Architectural and Historical Society: 74, 76. ISSN 0308-5562.
- Foley, Henry (1877). Records of the English province of the Society of Jesus: historic facts illustrative of the labours and sufferings of its members in the sixteenth and seventeenth centuries. Burns & Oates. pp. 279, 280, 284.
- Hadland, Tony (1992). Thames Valley Papists: from Reformation to Emancipation 1534–1829. Hadland Books. ISBN 0-9507431-4-3. Archived from the original on 14 March 2012.
- Page, W.H.; Ditchfield, P.H., eds. (1924). A History of the County of Berkshire. Victoria County History. Vol. 4. assisted by John Hautenville Cope. London: The St Katherine Press. pp. 285–294.
- Pevsner, Nikolaus (1966). Berkshire. The Buildings of England. Harmondsworth: Penguin Books. pp. 172–173.
- Sturdy, David; Case, Humphrey (1963). "Notes and News" (PDF). Oxoniensia. XXVIII. Oxford Architectural and Historical Society: 90. ISSN 0308-5562.
