= Canton of Alençon-2 =

Coordinates: 48.42°N 0.09°E

The canton of Alençon-2 is an administrative division of the Orne department, northwestern France. Its borders were modified at the French canton reorganisation which came into effect in March 2015. Its seat is in Alençon.

It consists of the following communes:

1. Alençon (partly)
2. Saint-Germain-du-Corbéis
