= Joan Vokins =

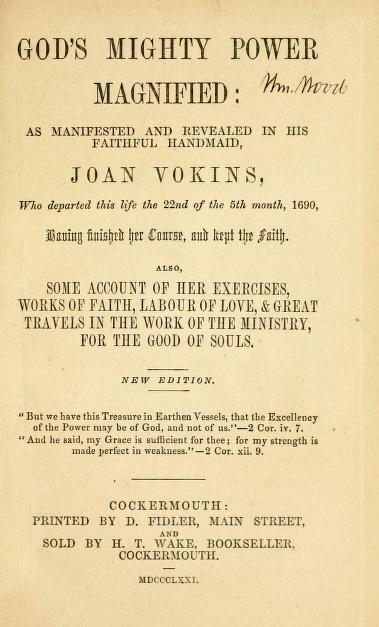
- Born: Joan Bunce; 1630? prob. Cheshire
- Died: 22 July 1690; Reading
- Known for: Evangelism
- Spouse: Richard Vokins
- Children: six

Joan Vokins or Joan Bunce (died 1690) was a British Quaker preacher and traveller.

== Life ==
Vokins was born as Joan Bunce. Her father Thomas Bunce was a yeoman of Charney Bassett in (what was then) Berkshire. She married another local farmer, Richard Vokins, of West Challow and she joined the Quakers. She was an enthusiastic evangelist for Quakerism. She persuaded her family and then set about to preach. In February 1680 she went to America, arriving in New York in May. She visited Long Island, Rhode Island, Boston, East and West Jersey, and Pennsylvania. On the return journey she went to the West Indian islands including Barbados, Antigua and Nevis,

Even after she returned to England on 3 June 1681 she continued preaching in Kent. Five years later she travelled in Ireland. She was at the annual meeting in London in 1690, and died at Reading, on her way home, on 22 July. Her husband was not with her as he was in gaol for not paying their taxes.

Besides three sons, one of whom predeceased her, she had three daughters. Her writings were collected by her brother-in-law, Oliver Sansom, in 'God's Mighty Power Magnified,’ London, 1691, 8vo; republished at Cockermouth, 1871.
