= East Hanney =

Village in Oxfordshire, England

Coordinates: 51.633°N 1.405°W

- Location within Oxfordshire
- Population: 796 (2001 census)
- OS grid reference: SU4192
- Civil parish: East Hanney
- District: Vale of White Horse
- Shire county: Oxfordshire
- Region: South East
- Country: England
- Sovereign state: United Kingdom
- Post town: Wantage
- Postcode district: OX12
- Dialling code: 01235
- Police: Thames Valley
- Fire: Oxfordshire
- Ambulance: South Central
- UK Parliament: Didcot and Wantage
- Website: TheHanneys

East Hanney is a village, and civil parish on Letcombe Brook about 3 miles (5 km) north of Wantage. Historically East and West Hanney were formerly a single ecclesiastical parish of Hanney. East Hanney was part of Berkshire until the 1974 boundary changes transferred the Vale of White Horse to Oxfordshire.

== Churches ==
East Hanney had a chapel by 1288, dedicated to Saint James, but Alice Yate is said to have dissolved it after she took over the manor in 1546. The present Church of England parish church of Saint James the Less was designed by the Gothic Revival architect George Edmund Street in a 13th century English style and built in 1856. It has since been made redundant and converted into a private home. Hanney Chapel is Non-conformist and was built in 1862. It was closed after the First World War but reopened in 1943.

== Economic history ==
Dandridge's Mill is a Georgian water mill built in the 1820s as a silk mill. It is a Grade II Listed building but after it ceased working it became derelict. In 2007 it was restored as four private apartments. It is a low-carbon redevelopment with a number of sources of renewable energy, including an Archimedean screw on the millstream that powers the property's own electricity generator.

== Amenities ==
East Hanney has a public house, the Black Horse free house. There is also a branch of the Royal British Legion. Hanney War Memorial Hall includes a village shop with sub-Post Office.

== Gallery ==
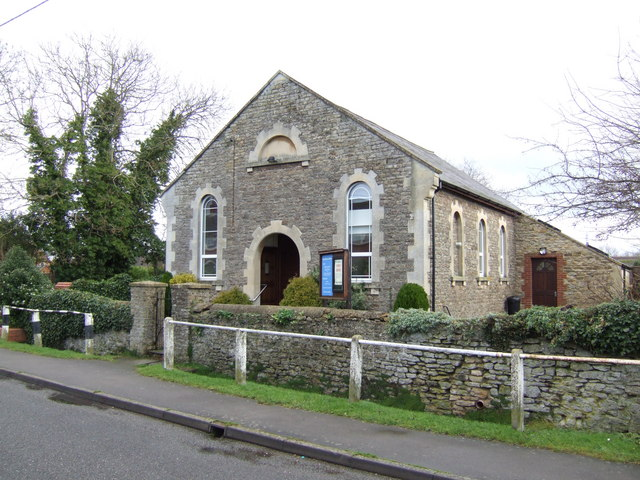
Hanney Chapel

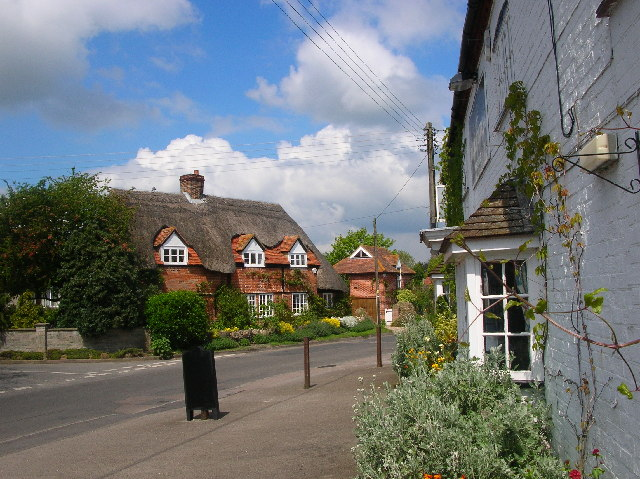
The Black Horse

== Sources ==
- Page, W.H.; Ditchfield, P.H., eds. (1924). A History of the County of Berkshire, Volume 4. Victoria County History. pp. 285–294.
- Pevsner, Nikolaus (1966). Berkshire. The Buildings of England. Harmondsworth: Penguin Books. p. 133.
