= Saint-Germain-du-Corbéis =

- Commune
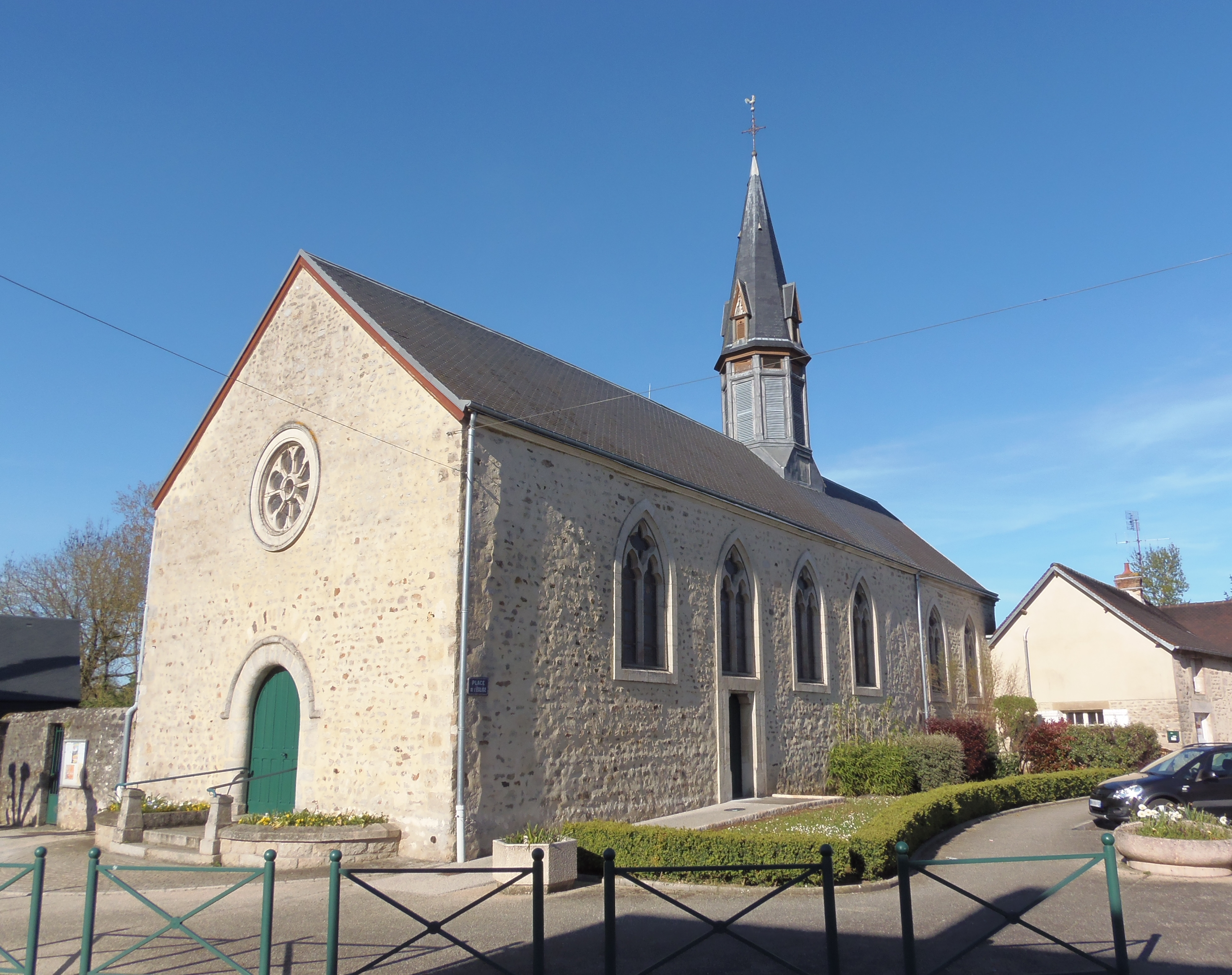
- The church in Saint-Germain-du-Corbéis
- Location of Saint-Germain-du-Corbéis
- Location within France Location within Normandy
- Coordinates: 48°25′25″N 0°03′46″E
- Country: France
- Region: Normandy
- Department: Orne
- Arrondissement: Alençon
- Canton: Alençon-2
- Intercommunality: CU Alençon

Government
  - Mayor (2020–2026): Gérard Lurçon
- Area^{1}: 7.52 km^{2} (2.90 sq mi)
- Elevation: 136 m (446 ft)
- Highest elevation: 197 m (646 ft)
- Lowest elevation: 127 m (417 ft)
- Population (2023): 3,636
  - Density: 484/km^{2} (1,250/sq mi)
- Time zone: UTC+01:00 (CET)
  - Summer (DST): UTC+02:00 (CEST)
- INSEE/Postal code: 61397 /61000
- ^{1} French Land Register data, which excludes lakes, ponds, glaciers > 1 km^{2} (0.386 sq mi or 247 acres) and river estuaries.

Saint-Germain-du-Corbéis (French pronunciation: [sɛ̃ ʒɛʁmɛ̃ dy kɔʁbei]) is a commune in the Orne department in north-western France.

== Geography ==
The commune is made up of the following collection of villages and hamlets, Saint-Germain-du-Corbéis, La Diguetterie, Les Aunais and Saint-Barthélémy.

The commune along with another 32 communes is part of a 3,503 hectare, Natura 2000 conservation area, called the Haute vallée de la Sarthe.

The river Sarthe flows through the commune.

== Population ==
Historical population
Year	Pop.	±% p.a.
1968	1,647	—
1975	2,332	+5.09%
1982	3,956	+7.84%
1990	4,176	+0.68%
1999	4,020	−0.42%
2007	3,631	−1.26%
2012	3,874	+1.30%
2017	3,798	−0.40%
2023	3,636	−0.72%
Source: INSEE

== Twin towns – sister cities ==
Saint-Germain-du-Corbéis is twinned with:

- Stanford in the Vale, England

== See also ==
- Communes of the Orne department
