= Hyde family of Denchworth =

The Hyde family of Denchworth in the English county of Berkshire (now Oxfordshire) were a landed family from at least the Norman period to the late modern era. They were chiefly seated at various places in Berkshire, but there were major branches in County Cork in Ireland. Members have included an abbot, a Knight of the Bath and a number of MPs and high sheriffs. Douglas Hyde of County Roscommon (who descended from the Cork branch), became the first President of Ireland in 1938. They are not related (except by marriage) to the noble Hyde family of Wiltshire and Cheshire.

== Irish branch ==
John Hyde was the maternal grandfather of Richard Boyle, 4th Earl of Shannon. He was a son-in-law of Benjamin Burton and Lady Anne Ponsonby. His mother-in-law was a daughter of William Ponsonby, 2nd Earl of Bessborough. John was himself a son of Arthur Hyde of Castle Hyde at Fermoy in County Cork and Anne Price. His mother was the only daughter and heiress of Richard Price of Ardmayle and Clonmore. His sister Jane Hyde married Richard Barry, a son of James Barry, 4th Earl of Barrymore and Lady Anne Chichester.

Arthur Hyde was a son of a senior Arthur Hyde and his first wife, Joan Yeats. His parents were married in 1695. His mother was a daughter of Richard Yeats of Youghal. His sister Elizabeth Hyde married John Lucas, an alderman of Youghal. His father was secondly married to Mary Evans and had four more children.

Arthur Hyde was in turn the son of an elder Arthur Hyde and his wife Elizabeth Gethin. His maternal grandfather was Sir Richard Gethin, 1st Baronet (c. 1615–1685). The younger Arthur had five sisters and two younger brothers. His paternal grandparents were William Hyde of Carrigoneda and Catherine Tynte. Catherine was a daughter of Robert Tynte. Robert was the eldest son of Elizabethan soldier Sir Robert Tynte of Youghal and Ballycrenane buried at Kilcredan graveyard) who went to Munster as a soldier during the Desmond Rebellion from Wraxhall, Somerset. His paternal aunts Katherine Hyde and Elizabeth Hyde were the respective wives of Sir Henry Spottiswood and James Spottiswood, siblings to each other. They were the sons of James Spottiswood, Bishop of Clogher from 1621 to 1645.

William Hyde was a son Sir Arthur Hyde of Carrigoneda and his wife, Helen Power. His maternal grandfather was Anthony Power of County Waterford. His paternal grandparents were Arthur Hyde and Elizabeth Pates. This Arthur was the first member of the family to settle in the Kingdom of Ireland and is considered the founder of the line.

According to Families of County Cork, Ireland: From the Earliest Times to the 20th Century: Irish Family Surnames with Locations & Origins, Including English, Scots & Anglo Norman Settlers and Settlements (1999) by Michael C. O'Laughlin, the Hydes (his maternal ancestors) held lands in County Cork since 1599. That year the forfeited estates of Gerald FitzGerald, 15th Earl of Desmond, leader of the Desmond Rebellions, were distributed to new land owners "for the purpose of planting them with English settlers". One Arthur Hyde received 6,000 acres (24 km^{2}) of land in County Cork. Twenty-four settlers were arranged to cultivate his new lands. The family seat was Castle Hyde, a mansion on the "north bank of the Blackwater River". The Hydes held their estates to the Victorian era when they sold them to Sir Henry Wrixon-Becher, 2nd Baronet (1826–1893).

== English branch ==
Arthur Hyde, who settled in Ireland, was the son of William Hyde of Denchworth in Berkshire (now Oxfordshire) and his wife Alice Essex. Alice was a daughter of Sir Thomas Essex of Lambourn. Elizabeth, his wife, was a daughter of John Pates of Buckingham. Those ancestors lived in the Elizabethan era. The wife of Thomas Essex was Margaret Sandys. She was a daughter of William Sandys, 1st Baron Sandys of the Vyne and his wife Margaret Bray.

William Hyde was a son to a senior William Hyde and his wife, Margery Cater. William and Margery received the Manor of Antwicks in Letcombe Regis on the occasion of their marriage. William died in 1557, Margery survived him. His paternal grandparents were Oliver Hyde (d. 1516) and Anne Lovingcott (d. 1523). They had five other children. Oliver Hyde was a son of a John Hyde. The name of his mother is unknown.

John Hyde was son to an elder John Hyde and his wife Alice Lidiard. His maternal grandfather was John Lidiard. The senior John inherited the manor of his family in 1448 but his father left part of his estate to an illegitimate son. Alice was buried in 1478. His paternal grandparents were John de la Hyde and his wife Graciana. Her family name and ancestry are unknown.

John de la Hyde was son of John atte Hyde (d. 1416). His mother is unknown. His paternal grandfather John "atte Hyde de Southdenchworth" (c. 1350 – 1407) was son to William Heygarston de la Hyde and his wife Petronilla. Heygarston died c. 1361. He was himself son to William de la Hyde, owner of two manors known respectively as La Hyde and Longworth-cum-Charney. He had inherited the former from his own father, a senior John de la Hyde.

John de la Hyde was son to a Warren de la Hyde, the first member of the family known to have held land in South Denchworth. His paternal grandparents were Sir Richard de la Hyde (d. 1278) and his wife Philippa. Richard was son to Sir Roger de la Hyde. Sir Roger is first mentioned in 1217, commissioned to recruit his family and friends in the service of William Marshal, 1st Earl of Pembroke, Regent for Henry III of England. In 1234, Roger is recorded already holding La Hyde.

The ancestry of Roger is recorded in various editions of the Landed Gentry but its accuracy has been questioned. His father Gilbert de la Hyde was reportedly a brother of John of Wallingford, Abbot of St Albans Abbey. His paternal grandfather Ralph de la Hyde (d. 1156) and John de la Hyde (d. 1135) are only known by name. Their original estate "La Hyde de Southcote" seems to have been replaced in time by other family seats. Unknown is when their estate was established. Family tradition in the 17th century placed their origins in the time of Canute the Great, a claim not mentioned in early sources.
