= Sir Charles Saxton, 2nd Baronet =

British civil servant and politician in Ireland

Sir Charles Saxton, 2nd Baronet (2 October 1773 – 24 January 1838) was a British barrister, senior civil servant in the Dublin Castle administration in Ireland, and Tory politician.

== Biography ==
Saxton was the eldest surviving son of Sir Charles Saxton, 1st Baronet and Mary Bush. He was educated at Eton College and University College, Oxford, before entering Lincoln's Inn in 1791. He was called to the English bar in 1800, after which he worked as a barrister practising on the Chester circuit and recorder of his native Abingdon-on-Thames. Between 1803 and 1808 he served as a volunteer in the London and Westminster Light Horse. Through his friendship with Charles Williams-Wynn, Saxton was able to secure a role in the Irish civil service commencing in August 1806. He returned briefly to England two months later to contest the Malmesbury constituency on the interest of the Earl of Radnor, in which he was unsuccessful.

Saxton retained his public office under the administration of the Duke of Portland, despite being a Grenvillite. In 1808, Saxton was appointed Under-Secretary for Ireland – the most senior civil servant in the Irish administration – by the Duke of Richmond. On 11 November he succeeded to his father's baronetcy. In May 1812 Saxton resigned his Irish office and in October that year he was elected as the Tory Member of Parliament for the Irish seat of Cashel. He was also returned for Malmesbury, but decided to sit for Cashel, making government the gift of the Malmesbury seat. In parliament he sat on the Irish finance committee and on 7 April 1813 was added to the corn trade committee, but otherwise he made little impact on proceedings. From 1815 to 1816 he was a commissioner of inquiry into the Irish courts of justice. After a period in Holland, in the spring of 1818 he returned to parliament and on 27 April he delivered his maiden speech in defence of an Abingdon petition against allegations of abuse of corporation charities, but was obliged to withdraw it. He did not obtain a seat in the election of June that year.

In 1824 he was appointed High Sheriff of Berkshire. Saxton died unmarried on 24 January 1838, at which point his title became extinct. His library was sold at auction by Fletcher & Wheatley in London on 5 July 1838 and following day; a copy of the catalogue is in Cambridge University Library (shelfmark Munby.c.155(9)).Saxton had one illegitimate son Charles William Saxton who married a french woman, Marie Ana Dupas. The Saxton country estate was sold to the Oliver Family but Saxton family kept the lands in Berkshire (now Oxfordshire). Together, they had one girl in France, Marie Eugénie Saxton.

Government offices
| Preceded by James Traill | Under-Secretary for Ireland; 1808–1812 | Succeeded by William Gregory |
Parliament of the United Kingdom
| Preceded by Robert Peel | Member of Parliament for Cashel; 1812–1818 | Succeeded by Richard Pennefather |
Baronetage of Great Britain
| Preceded by Charles Saxton | Baronet (of Circourt at Denchworth); 1808–1838 | Extinct |
