= Goosey =

Village in Oxfordshire, England

Coordinates: 51.622°N 1.487°W

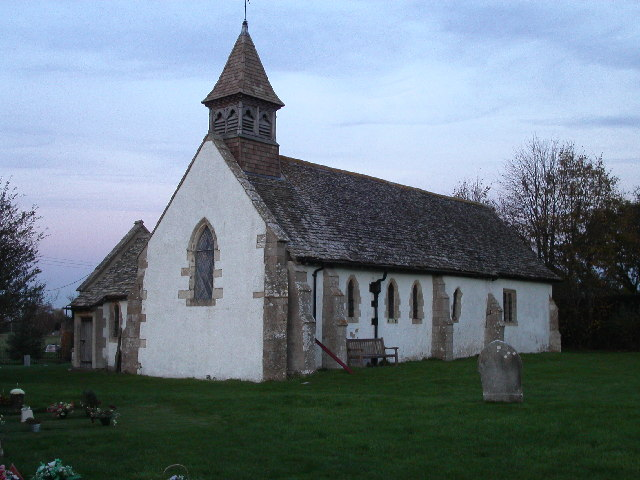
- All Saints' parish church

- Location within Oxfordshire
- Population: 135 (2011 Census)
- OS grid reference: SU3591
- Civil parish: Goosey
- District: Vale of White Horse
- Shire county: Oxfordshire
- Region: South East
- Country: England
- Sovereign state: United Kingdom
- Post town: Faringdon
- Postcode district: SN7
- Dialling code: 01367
- Police: Thames Valley
- Fire: Oxfordshire
- Ambulance: South Central
- UK Parliament: Witney
- Website: Goosey Parish Meeting

Goosey is a village and civil parish in England, about 4.5 miles (7 km) northwest of Wantage in the Vale of White Horse. Goosey was part of Berkshire until 1974, when the Vale of White Horse was transferred to Oxfordshire.

== Toponym ==
Goosey's toponym has evolved from the forms Gosie, Gosi and Goseig used in the 11th century, through Goseya in the 12th century and Gossehay in the 16th century before reaching its current form.

== History ==
Goosey was given by Offa, King of Mercia, in about 785 to the Abbey of Abingdon in exchange for the Isle of Andersey. The monks established a cell at Goosey, which is now the site of Abbey Farm.

== Manor ==
In the 11th century the manor was assessed during the reign of King Edward the Confessor (1042–66) as having 17 hides and worth £9; and then in the Domesday Book of 1086 as having 11 hides and worth £10. The abbey continued to hold the manor until 1538, when in the Dissolution of the Monasteries it was forced to surrender all its estates to the Crown.

In 1544 Henry Norris of Rycote and his wife Margery obtained a grant of the manor in fee. Goosey remained in the Norris family until Henry Norris' grandson Francis Norris, 1st Earl of Berkshire sold it in 1608. Goosey then passed through the Tawyer, Matthews and Saxton families until the early 19th century, when Sir Charles Saxton left it to his niece Mary, the wife of Admiral Robert Dudley Oliver. The Oliver family still held the manor in the 1920s.

== Parish church ==
The Church of England parish church of All Saints' has an Early English nave that was built in the 13th century. The present chancel is a late 16th-century Tudor addition, with a window given by Dr Christopher Wordsworth, one time Bishop of Lincoln, who was the vicar of Stanford and Goosey from 1850 to 1869. The church has a king post roof. The vestry on the north side of the church and the bell-turret on the nave gable were added in the 19th century. All Saints' is a chapelry of the parish of St Denys, Stanford in the Vale. All Saints' building is Grade II* listed.

== Sources ==
- Page, William; Ditchfield, PH, eds. (1924). A History of the County of Berkshire, Volume 4. Victoria County History. pp. 478–485.
- Pevsner, Nikolaus (1966). Berkshire. The Buildings of England. Harmondsworth: Penguin Books. p. 146.
