= Saxton baronets =

Escutcheon of the Saxton baronets of Circourt

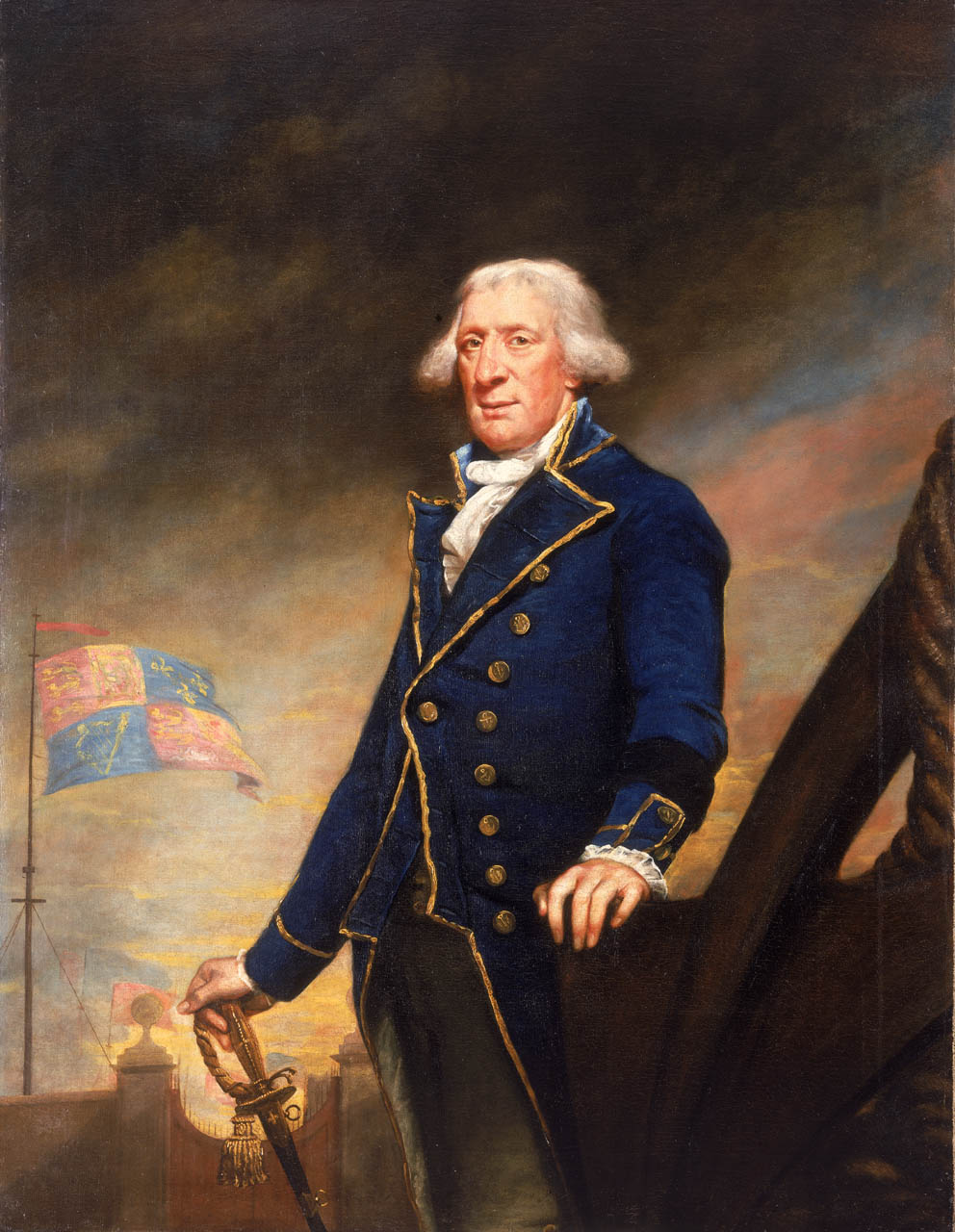
Commissioner Sir Charles Saxton, 1st Baronet, portrait c. 1794–5 by James Northcote

The Saxton baronetcy, of Circourt at Denchworth in the County of Berkshire (now Oxfordshire), was a title in the Baronetage of Great Britain. It was created on 26 July 1794 for Charles Saxton, Commissioner of the Royal Navy.

The 2nd Baronet sat as Member of Parliament for Cashel. The title became extinct on his death in 1838. An illegitimate child (Charles William Saxton) was born out of wedlock, and the Saxton family, through marriage to the French Dupas family, subsequently settled in France. Today, most members of the Dupas family live in France. However, descendants can be found among the Quêtu (Questes) family and Dupas family, who are based in northern France.

== Saxton baronets, of Circourt (1794) ==
- Sir Charles Saxton, 1st Baronet (circa 1730–1808)
- Sir Charles Saxton, 2nd Baronet (1773–1838).

Baronetage of Great Britain
Preceded by Baring baronets	Saxton baronets of Circourt; 26 July 1794	Succeeded by Pasley baronets
