= Denchworth =

Village in Oxfordshire, England

Coordinates: 51.623°N 1.451°W

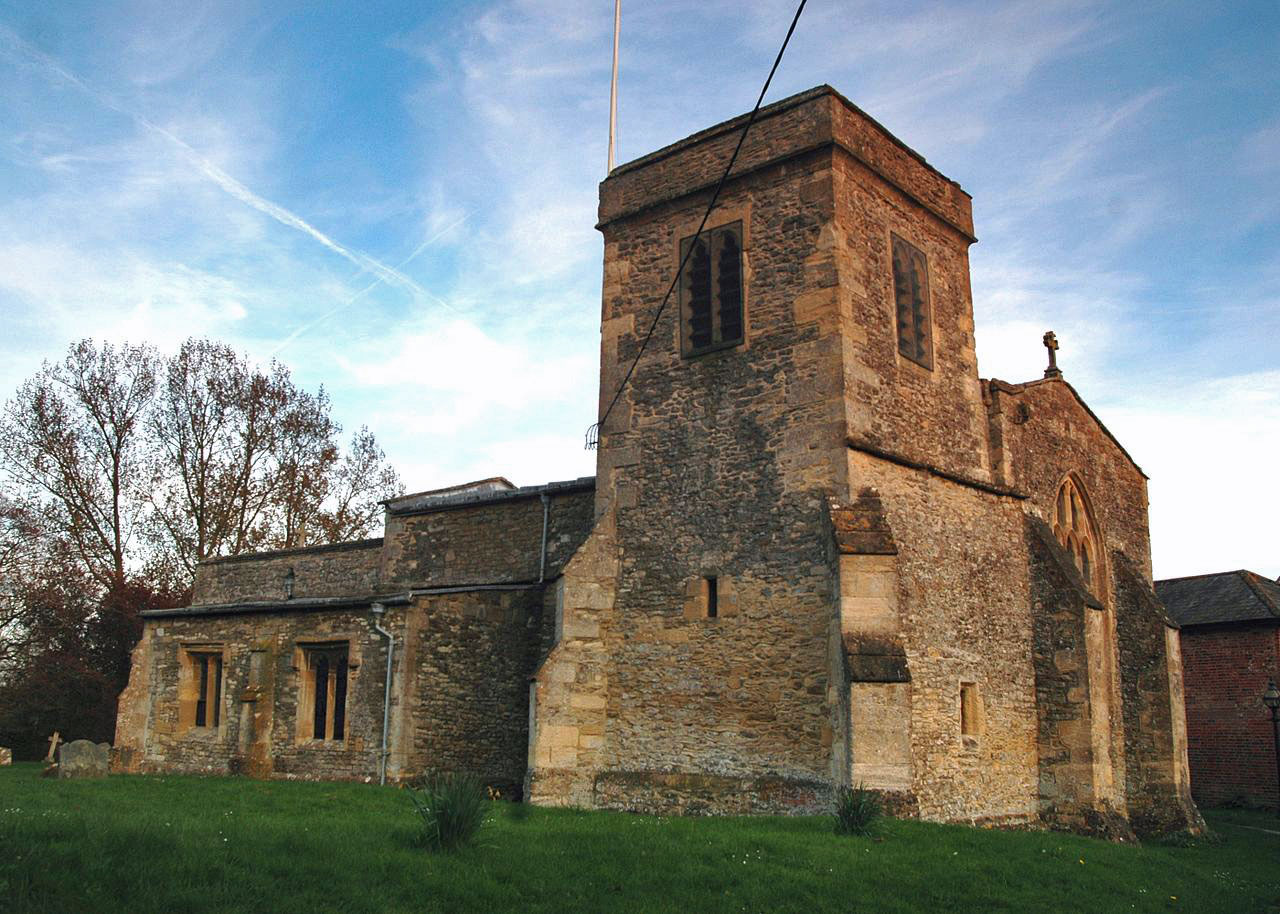
- St James' parish church

- Location within Oxfordshire
- Population: 171 (2011 census)
- OS grid reference: SU3891
- Civil parish: Denchworth
- District: Vale of White Horse
- Shire county: Oxfordshire
- Region: South East
- Country: England
- Sovereign state: United Kingdom
- Post town: Wantage
- Postcode district: OX12
- Dialling code: 01235
- Police: Thames Valley
- Fire: Oxfordshire
- Ambulance: South Central
- UK Parliament: Didcot and Wantage
- Website: Denchworth Parish Meeting

Denchworth is a village and civil parish about 2.5 miles (4 km) north of Wantage. It was part of Berkshire until the 1974 boundary changes transferred the Vale of White Horse to Oxfordshire. The 2011 census recorded the parish's population as 171. The parish is bounded by the Land Brook in the west and the Childrey Brook in the east. The Great Western Main Line between Reading and Swindon runs through the parish just south of the village, but there is no station.

== Manors ==
The Abingdon Chronicle claims that Cædwalla of Wessex granted Deniceswurth to Abingdon Abbey late in the seventh century, and that this was confirmed by Coenwulf of Mercia early in the ninth century. The Domesday Book records that by 1086 Henry de Ferrers held the manor of Denchesworde:

"The same Henry de Ferrers holds Denchworth and Reiner holds of him. Aethelric held it TRE. Then assessed at 7 hides now at five and a half hides. There is land for five ploughs. In demesne is one plough and five villans and five cottars with one plough and 30 acres (12 ha) of meadow and there is a church. TRE it was worth 70 shillings and afterwards 60 shillings. Now 4 pounds."

Overlordship of the manor remained with the Ferrers family until Denecheswrth was granted to the Earls of Lancaster along with the Honour of Tutbury, presumably starting with Edmund, 1st Earl of Lancaster in the latter part of the 13th century. Denchworth manor was assessed at half a knight's fee and had been let to Henry de Tubney by the middle of the 13th century. It remained with his manor of Tubney until 1428. Somewhen between then and 1448 the half fee was sold to a member of the Hyde family.

The Hydes kept the manor until 1617, when George Hyde sold it to Sir William Cockayne. Sir Wiliam's son Charles Cokayne, Charles inherited Denchworth in 1626. Charles Cokayne was created 1st Viscount Cullen in 1642, and was succeeded by Brien Cokayne, 2nd Viscount Cullen in 1661. In 1663 the 2nd Viscount sold Denchworth to Gregory Geering. Denchworth remained with the Geering family until 1758, when William Geering sold it to Worcester College, Oxford. The college still held the manor in the early 1920s. The landowning Fettiplace family had a home at North Denchworth.

=== Circourt ===
Denchworth parish also included a manor that in the 12th century was called Suthcote — a toponym derived from the fact that it is south of the village. The name evolved via Sudecote in the 13th century and Southcote or Circote in the 17th century to the present "Circourt". This manor existed by 947, when King Eadred granted an estate of five hides there to one Wulfric, who conveyed it to Abingdon Abbey. In 1221 the manor was assessed at seven hides. The Abbey retained the overlordship of Circourt until the dissolution of the monasteries in the 16th century, when it was forced to surrender all its estates to the Crown.

In 1166 Circourt was assessed at one knight's fee. It descended with the families of de Aura, de l'Orti, Whittock, atte Ya, Saumon and others until the 15th century, and by 1442 it was held by John Hyde. Along with Denchworth, Circourt was bought by Sir William Cockayne in 1617 and Gregory Geering in 1663. The Geerings sold Circourt to the Matthews family of Goosey, who sold it to Edward Saxton of Abingdon. His heir Charles Saxton was commissioner for the Royal Navy, and in 1794 was created first Saxton Baronet. His son Sir Charles Saxton, 2nd Baronet was Member of Parliament for Cashel 1812–18 and held the manor in 1824. On his death in 1838 the baronetcy became extinct, but Circourt passed to his nephew Charles Oliver. In the early 1920s the Oliver family still held the manor.

=== Cleets ===
The Domesday Book records a manor of six hides at South Denchworth held by one Laurence of Wilbrighton in Staffordshire. His heirs became the Wilbrighton family, and by 1241 they had divided the manor and granted half to the Augustinian Poughley Priory. David Martyn, Bishop of St David's held this tenancy early in the 14th century, and in 1328 left it to his nephew Thomas de Carew. In 1333 de Carew granted the tenancy of two parts of the Poughley holding to Richard Cleet of Chipping Lambourn, and this holding came to be known as Cleets. Later the Hyde family leased Cleets from one of his heirs, and in 1408 they bought the tenancy. Cleets seems to have been included with the other lands sold to Sir William Cockayne in 1617.

The earliest recorded ancestor of the Hyde family in Denchworth parish was one Warin, who lived there in the middle of the 13th century. The family's land was in the manor of Circourt and was assessed at one hide, wherefrom the family derived its surname. In 1327 de la Hyde held a messuage and four virgates in Circourt. With the other Hyde estates this land was sold to Sir William Cockayne in 1617 and Gregory Geering in 1663. One of the Geerings then sold it to the Moyer family, from whom it passed by marriage to John Heathcote of Connington Castle. It then passed by marriage to William Dawnay, 6th Viscount Downe. It was still in the Dawnay family in the early 1920s.

=== Lovedays ===
A messuage and seven virgates at South Denchworth seems to have come from the estate held by the Wilbrighton family in about 1250 and was the subject of legal disputes involving the Wilbrightons in 1305 and 1307. By 1310 it was held by Sir John de Charlton, who granted it to Richard de la Rivere. In 1327 Robert de la Rivere granted seisin of all the family's lands at South Denchworth to John Loveday. In 1382 Loveday's son-in-law and daughter granted this estate to John atte Hyde and it became part of the Hyde estates, but it retained the name "Lovedays".

=== Manor houses ===
There are two moated sites in the parish, both of which are on Childrey Brook. Denchworth's medieval manor house in the village had a large moat, part of which is still in water. The oldest part of the present house is late 15th or early 16th century. A three-bay wing was added to one side of the house early in the 17th century, and a second wing added to the other side later in the 17th century. The manor house is a Grade II* listed building. Denchworth's other moated site is in the northeast corner of the parish. It is a small, rectangular site about 440 yards (400 m) southeast of Hyde Farm. Just north of the Manor House in the village were Brook Lane Barns; an 18th-century five-bayed barn flanked by shelter sheds. The barn and sheds were timber-framed, had weatherboarded walls and thatched roofs and had been converted into offices. Brook Lane Barns were destroyed by fire in the early hours of 11 March 2012.

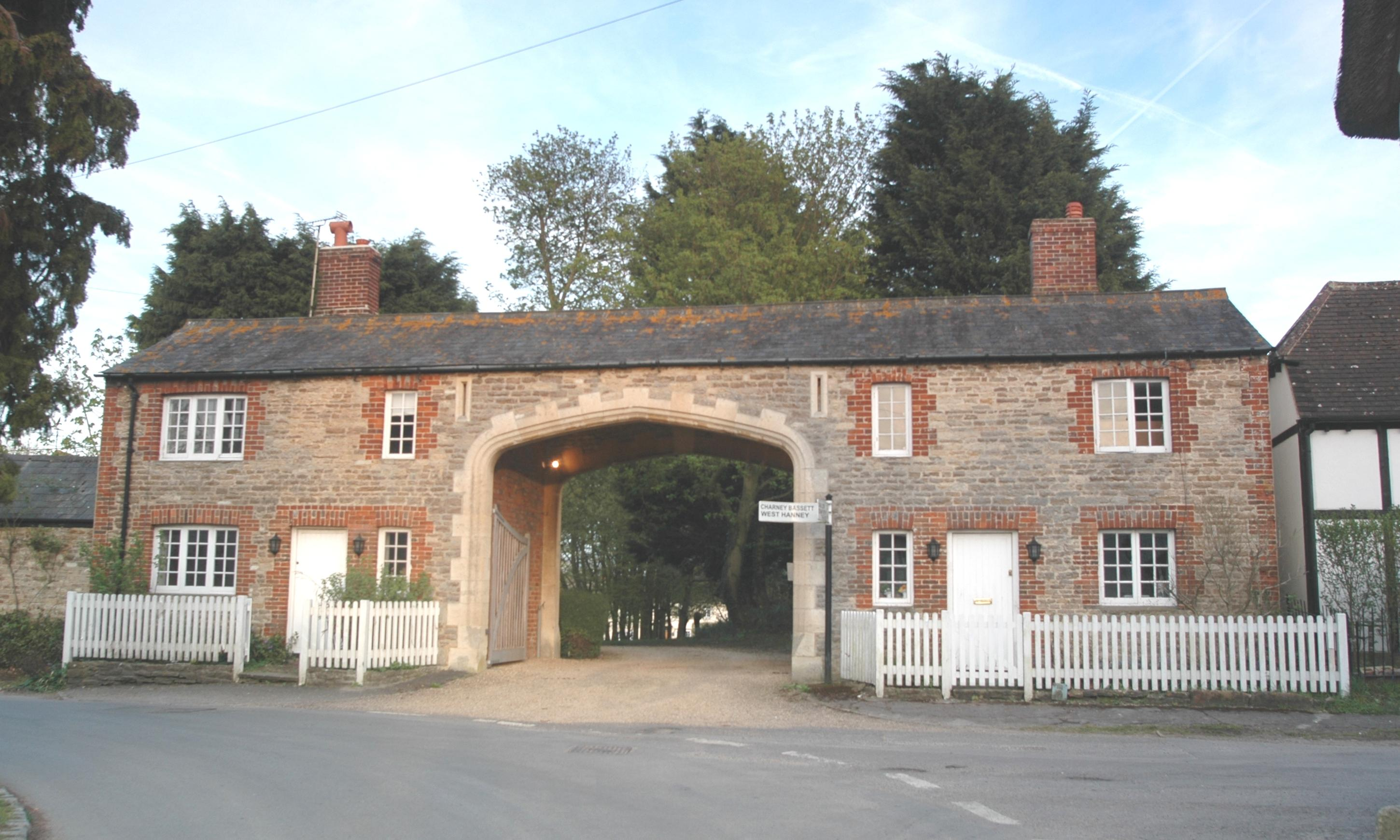
The Archway is the western entrance lodge for the Manor House

== Parish church ==
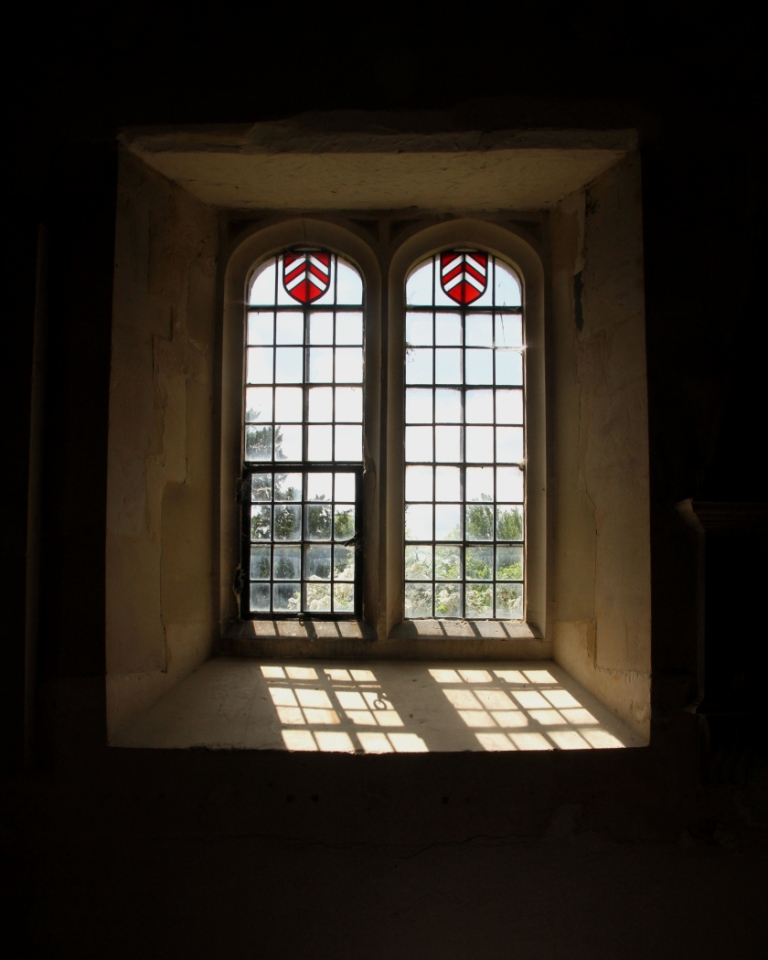
St James' parish church: late medieval south window of the south transept

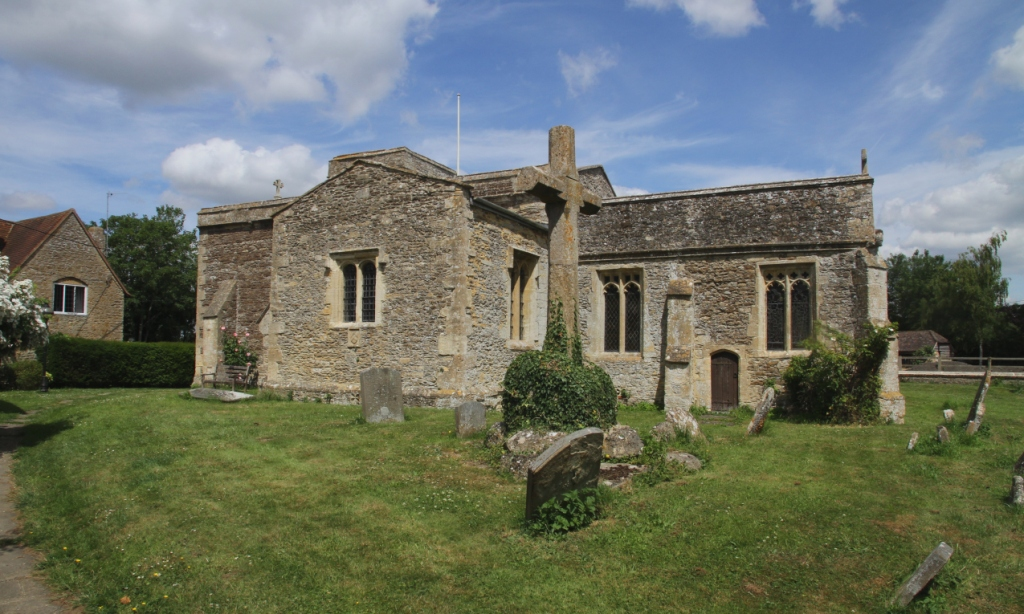
St James' parish church from the southeast, showing the chancel, south transept and churchyard cross

Denchworth had a parish church by 1086, but the oldest part of the present Church of England parish church of Saint James is 12th century. This is a small part of the south wall of the nave, which seems to have been rebuilt and extended westwards in the 13th century. The south doorway is a plain late Norman arch. Later in the 13th century the north chapel and the north-west tower were added. The south transept was added in the 14th century and was originally Decorated Gothic. The chancel, north chapel and possibly the south transept were rebuilt in the 15th century, mostly with Perpendicular Gothic windows. The church was restored from 1852 onwards. It is a Grade II* listed building. The Perpendicular Gothic font is also 15th-century.

The Perpendicular-style pulpit is neo-Gothic and was made in 1889. The south porch is neo-Gothic and was added during the 19th-century restoration. It replaces a two-storey south porch, in whose upper room Gregory Geering and the then vicar established an antiquarian chained library. Its contents included a 1483 edition of the Golden Legend that is now in the Bodleian Library in Oxford and other rare volumes that were transferred to Denchworth vicarage. The library also held curiosities such as a "mermaid's rib". The church has monumental brasses to Oliver Hyde (died 1516) and his wife Agnes, to William Hyde (died 1557), his wife Margery and their children, and to another William Hyde (died 1567) and his wife Alice. One of the inscriptions for William and Margery Hyde has a commemorative plaque for the foundation of Bisham Priory in 1333 on the back. In the south transept is a memorial tablet to Gregory Geering (died 1690) and four more to members of the Geering family who died in the 18th century.

The tower has a ring of four bells, but they are currently unringable. Ellis I Knight of Reading, Berkshire cast the treble bell in 1624. Henry III Bagley, who had bell foundries at Chacombe in Northamptonshire and Witney in Oxfordshire, cast the second bell in 1733. The remaining bells are from the Whitechapel Bell Foundry: the third bell cast by Robert Stainbank in 1868 and the tenor bell by Mears and Stainbank in 1869. St James' also has a Sanctus bell cast by an unknown founder in about 1699. St James' parish is now a member of the Vale Benefice, along with the parishes of East Challow, Grove and West Hanney.

== Economy and amenities ==
At the junction of Brook Lane and Hyde Road is the base and broken shaft of a 14th or 15th century preaching cross. The village has a 17th-century public house, the Fox Inn, controlled by Greene King Brewery. In 1729 Richard Gilgrasse left £50 to be invested in land and for the income from the investment to fund the teaching of poor children in Denchworth parish. A sum of £53 13s 2d in British government consols was added to this after Denchworth's common lands were enclosed in 1806. A National School in Denchworth was established in 1858. The school building and schoolteacher's house were designed by the Oxford Diocesan Architect George Edmund Street and built in 1853. The interest from the consols was put towards the upkeep of the building. The former school building is now a private house. The village used to have a post office, which was in a 17th-century former farmhouse in Hyde Road. It is now a private house.

== Sources ==
- Page, W.H.; Ditchfield, P.H., eds. (1924). A History of the County of Berkshire. Victoria County History. Vol. 4. assisted by John Hautenville Cope. London: The St Katherine Press. pp. 280–284.
- Pevsner, Nikolaus (1966). Berkshire. The Buildings of England. Harmondsworth: Penguin Books. pp. 126–127.
