= Sir Charles Saxton, 1st Baronet =

Royal Navy officer (1732–1808)

Captain Sir Charles Saxton Bt
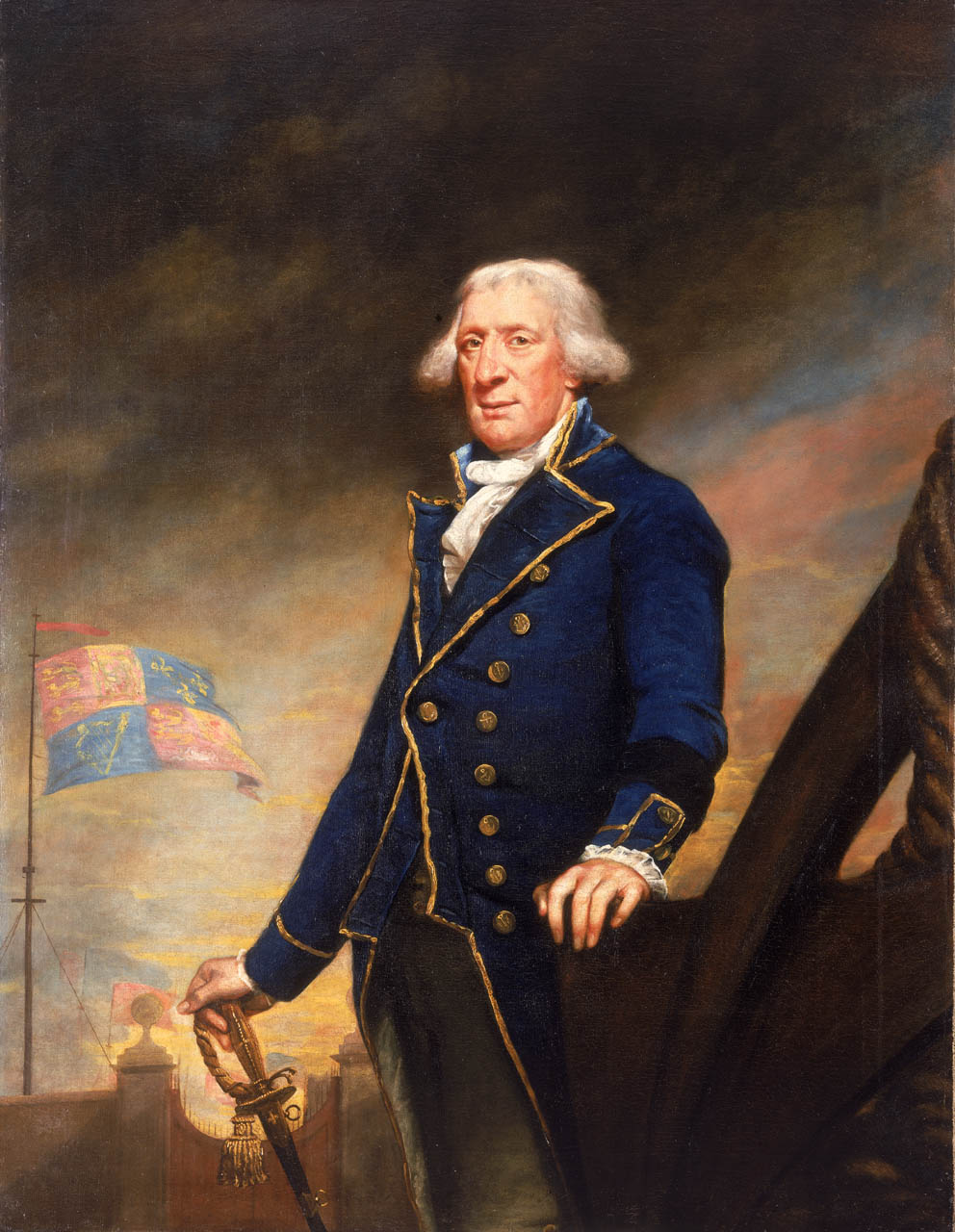
- Saxton as commissioner at Portsmouth, c. 1794
- Born: 1732
- Died: November 1808 (aged 75–76)
- Relatives: Charles Saxton (son)
- Military career
- Allegiance: Great Britain; United Kingdom
- Branch: Royal Navy
- Service years: 1745–1806
- Rank: Captain
- Commands: HMS Magnanime; HMS Pearl; HMS Phoenix; HMS Invincible
- Conflicts: War of the Austrian Succession; Seven Years' War; American Revolutionary War; Capture of Sint Eustatius; Battle of the Chesapeake; Battle of Saint Kitts
- Awards: Baronetcy

Captain Sir Charles Saxton, 1st Baronet (1732 – November 1808) was a Royal Navy officer who served in the War of the Austrian Succession, Seven Years' War, American War of Independence and French Revolutionary and Napoleonic Wars.

Born the son of a merchant, Charles Saxton entered the navy and served on a number of ships. He went out to the East Indies during the Seven Years' War, and shortly after his return to England was promoted to his first commands. He commissioned several frigates during the brief interlude of peace prior to the outbreak of the American War of Independence, before taking command of the ship of the line HMS Invincible. After a brief period in the English Channel, he sailed to North America, where he would a number of actions. A bout of illness after his arrival in the West Indies forced him to relinquish command for a time, but he went on to recover and to see action with Sir Samuel Hood's squadron at the Battle of the Chesapeake in 1781. He returned with Hood to the West Indies, and was again in action at the Battle of Saint Kitts in early 1782, before taking the Invincible into refit. The remainder of the war was spent cruising with squadrons off the North American coast.

A period of unemployment followed the end of hostilities, but in 1787 tensions with France brought Saxton a place on a commission into the impress service, and he spent the rest of his career as an administrator. He became commissioner at Portsmouth, the navy's principal dockyard, in 1789 and held the position until his retirement nearly twenty years later. During these years he oversaw operations during the French Revolutionary and Napoleonic Wars, his career being rewarded with a baronetcy in 1794. Retiring finally with a pension in 1806, Sir Charles died in 1808, being succeeded in the baronetcy by his eldest son, Charles.

== Family and early life ==
Charles Saxton was born in 1732, the youngest son of Edward Saxton, a merchant of London and Abingdon, and his wife Mary, née Bush. The family's country estate was Circourt Manor at Denchworth in Berkshire (now Oxfordshire). Saxton entered the navy in January 1745, becoming a captain's servant aboard the 50-gun HMS Gloucester, under the command of Captain Charles Saunders. Saxton spent the next three years aboard the Gloucester, before joining the 58-gun HMS Eagle under Captain Richard Collins, while the Eagle was the guard ship at Plymouth. From her he moved to the 60-gun HMS St Albans where he served on the Guinea coast with Captain John Byron. After a period of time on this service he was promoted to lieutenant on 2 January 1757, and went to the East Indies to serve in the fleets under Vice-Admiral Charles Watson, and then Vice-Admiral George Pocock, during the Seven Years' War.

Saxton returned to England in 1760 and was briefly assigned as lieutenant to the 64-gun HMS Modeste early that year, though on 11 October 1760 Saxton received a promotion to commander. He was apparently in command of one of the yachts sent to escort HMY Royal Charlotte, carrying Duchess Charlotte of Mecklenburg-Strelitz from Cuxhaven to Harwich for her marriage to George III. Saxton was promoted to post captain on 28 January 1762, and appointed to command the 74-gun HMS Magnanime, flying the broad pennant of Commodore Lord Howe, and subsequently forming part of the fleet under Sir Edward Hawke. The commission was apparently an uneventful one, the French having been decisively defeated by Hawke at the Battle of Quiberon Bay in 1759, and after the Seven Years' War had concluded, Saxton paid off the Magnanime.

== Interwar years ==
Saxton remained in active employment after the war, commissioning the 32-gun HMS Pearl in March 1763 and taking her out to the Newfoundland station in May. In 1764 he was sent by Commodore Hugh Palliser to reconnoitre French activities in the Gulf of St Lawrence, and to deter any claims they might make there. He remained with the Pearl until 1766, when he paid her off. He appears to have held no further commands until October 1770, when he commissioned the 40-gun HMS Phoenix during the period of the Falklands Crisis, when it was feared that war might break out with Spain. In the event, the crisis passed without breaking into open hostilities and Saxton paid Phoenix off in January 1771. In July 1771 he married Mary Bush.

== American War of Independence ==
Another period without active employment then passed for Saxton, before the outbreak of the American War of Independence. He commissioned the 74-gun HMS Invincible and in 1780 was part of the Channel Fleet under Francis Geary, and later George Darby.^{[a]} Saxton sailed to the West Indies in November 1780 and there became part of Sir Samuel Hood's squadron. He seems to have been present at the capture of Sint Eustatius on 3 February 1781, but a bout of ill-health compelled him to leave his ship for some months, and Invincible was under the temporary command of Captain Richard Bickerton at the Battle of Fort Royal on 29/30 April 1781.

1784 painting of the Battle of Saint Kitts by Nicholas Pocock. Saxton was present at the battle, commanding HMS Invincible.

Invincible went on to form part of Francis Samuel Drake's squadron at the Invasion of Tobago in May 1781, after which time Saxton was well enough to resume command, and to sail with her to North America with Sir Samuel Hood's force. He was with Hood's squadron, as part of the larger fleet under Sir Thomas Graves, at the Battle of the Chesapeake on 5 September, though Hood's force in the rear took little part in the action. Saxton then returned to the West Indies with Hood's force and was present at the Battle of Saint Kitts on 25/26 January 1782. Again his ship was only lightly engaged, and suffered casualties of only two of her men wounded. Hood then despatched Invincible to Jamaica to be refitted, after which Saxton sailed in July 1782 to join Admiral Hugh Pigot off the American coast.^{[b]} He was off New York from September until October 1782, and in November took part in the blockade of Cape François. He was present with Edmund Affleck's squadron at Puerto Cavello in February 1783, and on 19 February Invincible retook the 44-gun HMS Argo, which two French frigates had captured shortly before.

== Post-war and administrative career ==
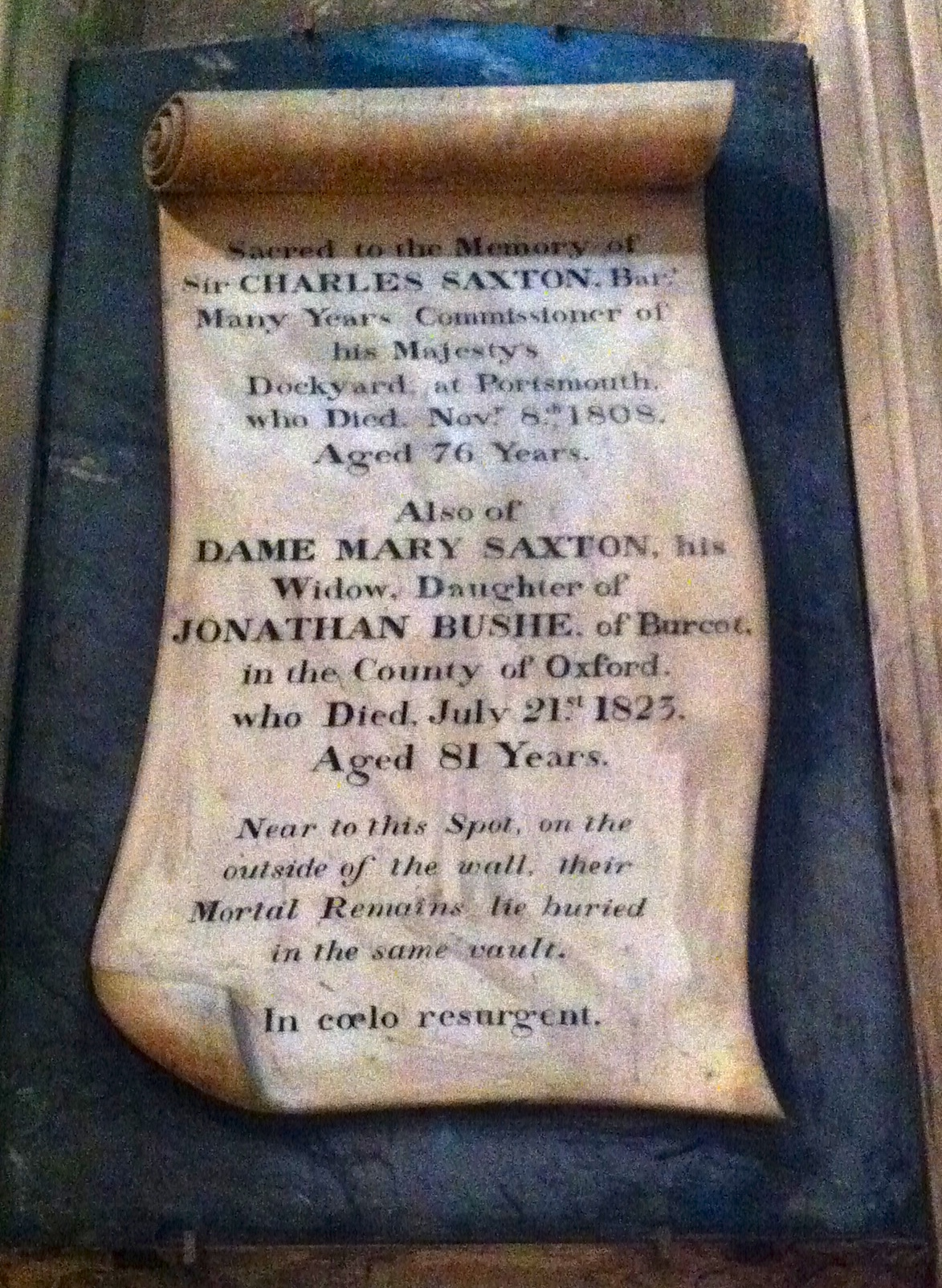
Memorial to Charles Saxton in Gloucester Cathedral

Saxton returned to England in mid-1783 and paid Invincible off. Again left without a ship, it was not until 1787 that he received another post. Tensions mounted with France that year, and Saxton was appointed to a commission with the purpose of examining the working of the impress system, with Saxton responsible for London. Again the crisis passed without breaking into open war, and in 1789 Saxton became commissioner of the navy at Portsmouth. It was an important posting at an important time, Portsmouth being the navy's principal dockyard, and Saxton oversaw operations during the expansion of the navy. A contemporary biographer noted that "he continued to fill [the office] with the highest reputation, as well on account of his ability, as to the attentive diligence to the duties of his situation, and his unblemished integrity."

Saxton was created baronet of Circourt on 19 July 1794. He remained as commissioner at Portsmouth throughout the French Revolutionary Wars, and part of the Napoleonic Wars. He was described by J. K. Laughton as "a low-profile commissioner who disliked administrative innovations". He retired in 1806 with a pension of £750 a year, with a remainder of £300 per annum to his wife if she survived him. Sir Charles Saxton died in November 1808, and was succeeded in the baronetcy by his eldest son, Charles. He had six other children by his marriage. His fourth child, Philadelphia-Hannah, married the naval officer Captain Robert Dudley Oliver on 19 June 1805. His elder brother Clement Saxton was appointed High Sheriff of Berkshire in 1777.

== Notes ==
a. John Charnock's Biographia Navalis suggests that Saxton commissioned Invincible in 1778, J. K. Laughton in the Oxford Dictionary of National Biography instead has 1779. Rif Winfield's British Warships in the Age of Sail lists a number of other commanders during this period, from Anthony Parrey in 1778, John Laforey in 1779, Samuel Cornish in July 1779, and then George Falconer from April 1780. Falconer was sent to join Thomas Graves's squadron, but her crew mutinied. Winfield notes that it was "later in 1780" that Saxton took command.

b. Laughton instead suggests that Saxton remained at Jamaica until the end of the war. Charnock and Winfield counter this, reporting on Saxton's and Invincible's movements up until 1783.

== Citations ==
Baronetage of Great Britain
New creation	Baronet (of Circourt); 1794–1808	Succeeded by Charles Saxton
