= Charney Bassett =

Village and civil parish in England

Coordinates: 51.648°N 1.453°W

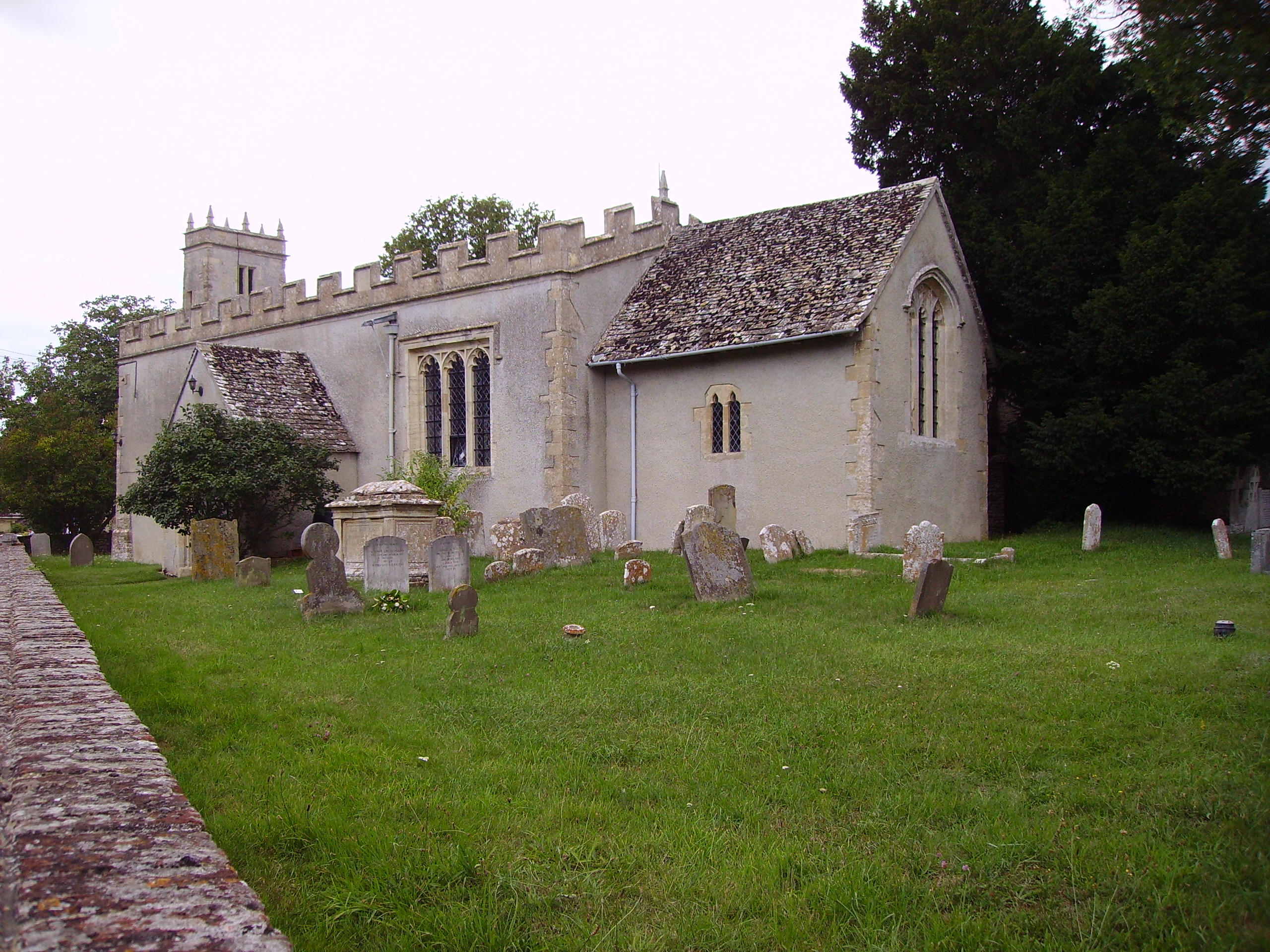
- St Peter's parish church

- Location within Oxfordshire
- Population: 314 (2011 census)
- OS grid reference: SU3794
- Civil parish: Charney Bassett
- District: Vale of White Horse
- Shire county: Oxfordshire
- Region: South East
- Country: England
- Sovereign state: United Kingdom
- Post town: Wantage
- Postcode district: OX12
- Dialling code: 01235
- Police: Thames Valley
- Fire: Oxfordshire
- Ambulance: South Central
- UK Parliament: Witney
- Website: Charney Bassett Parish Council

Charney Bassett is a village and civil parish about 4 1/2 miles (7 km) north of Wantage and 6 miles (10 km) east of Faringdon in the Vale of White Horse. It was part of Berkshire until the 1974 boundary changes transferred it to Oxfordshire. The 2011 census recorded the parish population as 314. The River Ock flows through it, and divides here for a mile or so. The alternative name of the river, Charn or Cearn, may have originally applied to the northern arm only.

== Archaeology ==
In 1978 Thames Water dredged a prehistoric flint axe-head from the River Ock in the parish. About 1 mile (1.6 km) north of the village, between Charney and Pusey is Cherbury Camp, an Iron Age earthwork. It looks like the nearby hillforts on the Berkshire Downs but is unusual in being built on more or less level ground, away from any hill. Cherbury means "fort beside the River Cearn". It is larger than Uffington Castle hill fort.

== History ==
Charney Bassett has been settled since the Anglo-Saxon era. The earliest known records of the locality's history records a grant of land to the Abbot of Abingdon Abbey in 811. The surrounding area was largely marshland and the meaning of Charney is "island in the River Cearn". This was an alternative name for the River Ock, that runs close by and which supplies the mill stream. In about 1630 the Quaker evangelist Joan Vokins was born to Thomas Bunce of Charney.

== Notable buildings and structures ==
The Church of England parish church of Saint Peter is Grade I listed. It has some twelfth-century parts and a turret with two medieval chiming bells. Noteworthy is the tympanum of the church, with a Romanesque relief depicting the ascension of Alexander the Great to the sky, a legendary episode from a version of the so-called Pseudo-Callisthenes (the Alexander Romance). Along with the churches of Longworth, Hinton Waldrist, Lyford, Buckland, Pusey and Littleworth, it is part of the Benefice of Cherbury with Gainfield.

On the village green is a medieval stone pillar mounted upon three steps. This may have been a market cross where goods could be offered for sale at certain times of the year. A sundial was later added to the top and this would have been used as the village time-piece. After the First World War the centre step was replaced with a dressed stone memorial to the fallen, whose names are inscribed thereon. Charney Manor is a Grade I listed building. It was built in the thirteenth century as a grange for Abingdon Abbey, which then owned extensive land around the village. It is now owned by the Quakers. Charney Water Mill and its adjoining cottage are Grade II listed. The mill is owned by Oxfordshire County Council and leased to the parish council. The machinery is mainly intact and the mill has been undergoing restoration by the Vale of White Horse Industrial Archaeology Group since about 1975. The parish has 18 other Grade II listed buildings.

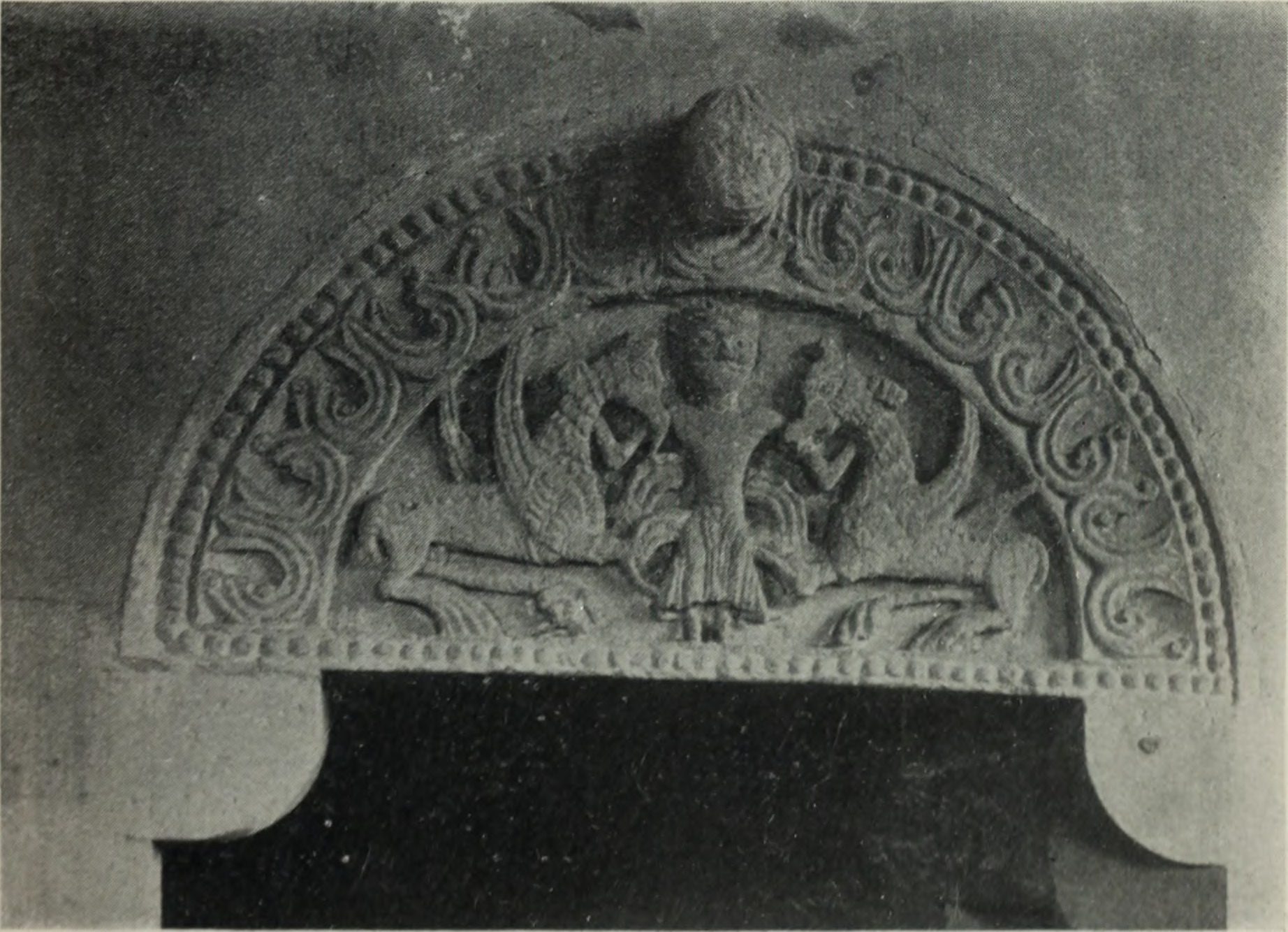
The tympanum with the depiction of the "Celestial Journey of Alexander the Great"

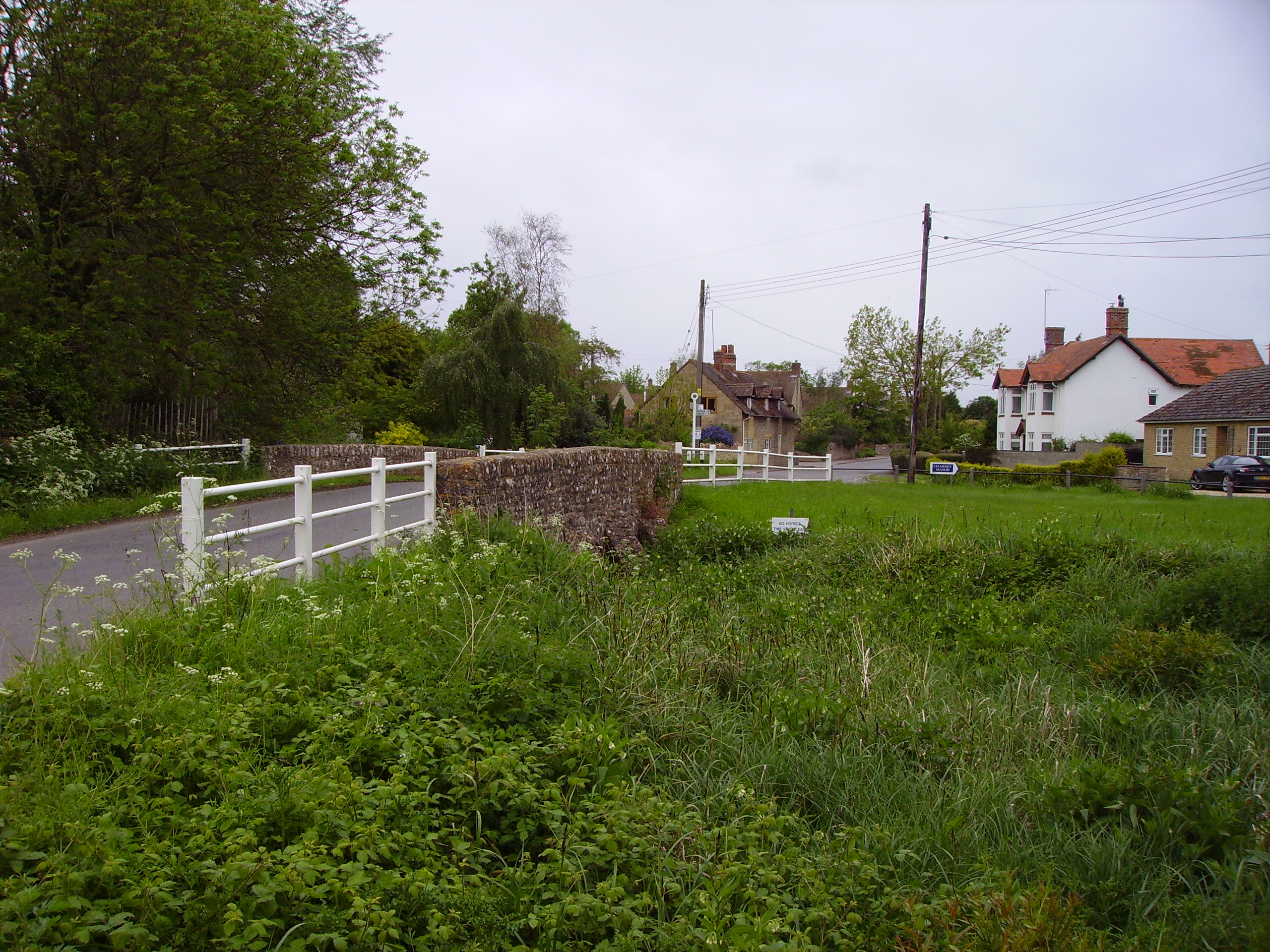
Charney Bassett, from the bridge over the mill stream

== Amenities ==
Charney Bassett has a public house, the Chequers Inn.

== In literature ==
A number of literary works and local histories have been written about Charney Bassett or in which Charney Bassett features heavily, including Islands of the Vale (1908) by Eleanor G. Hayden and The Length of the Road (1985) by Maud Ody.
