= Little Baldon =

Hamlet in Oxfordshire, England

Coordinates: 51.678065°N 1.184709°W

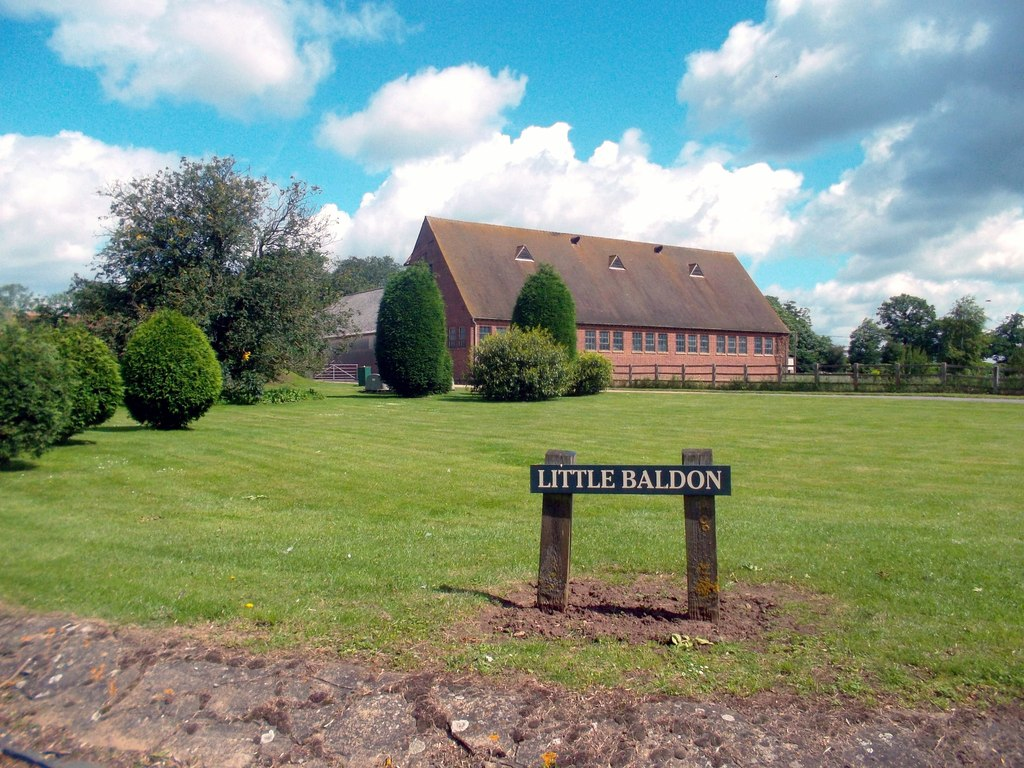
- Brick Barn at Little Baldon Farm

- Location within Oxfordshire
- OS grid reference: SP5600
- Civil parish: Marsh Baldon
- District: South Oxfordshire
- Shire county: Oxfordshire
- Region: South East
- Country: England
- Sovereign state: United Kingdom
- Post town: Oxford
- Postcode district: OX44
- Dialling code: 01865
- Police: Thames Valley
- Fire: Oxfordshire
- Ambulance: South Central
- UK Parliament: Didcot and Wantage
- Website: Baldons Parish Council

Little Baldon is a hamlet in the Marsh Baldon civil parish, about 5 miles (8 km) southeast of Oxford in Oxfordshire, south of Marsh Baldon and west of Chiselhampton.

Little Baldon is near the other "Baldon" villages included in an old rhyme:

Marsh Baldon, Toot Baldon, Baldon on the Green,
Little Baldon, Big Baldon, Baldon-in-between

It is where an RAF Handley Page Hastings crashed in 1965, killing all 41 people aboard. This was the third worst air crash in the United Kingdom up to that time. A memorial plaque in the parish church of St Lawrence at Toot Baldon commemorates the disaster.

== See also ==
- Baldon Row
- List of places in Oxfordshire
