= Baldon Row =

Hamlet in Oxfordshire, England

Coordinates: 51.697°N 01.183°W

- Location within Oxfordshire
- OS grid reference: SP5600
- Civil parish: Toot Baldon
- District: South Oxfordshire
- Shire county: Oxfordshire
- Region: South East
- Country: England
- Sovereign state: United Kingdom
- Post town: Oxford
- Postcode district: OX44
- Dialling code: 01865
- Police: Thames Valley
- Fire: Oxfordshire
- Ambulance: South Central
- UK Parliament: Didcot and Wantage

Baldon Row is a hamlet in Toot Baldon civil parish, about 5 miles (8.0 km) southeast of Oxford in Oxfordshire.
