= Marsh Baldon =

Village in Oxfordshire, England

Coordinates: 51.690°N 01.184°W

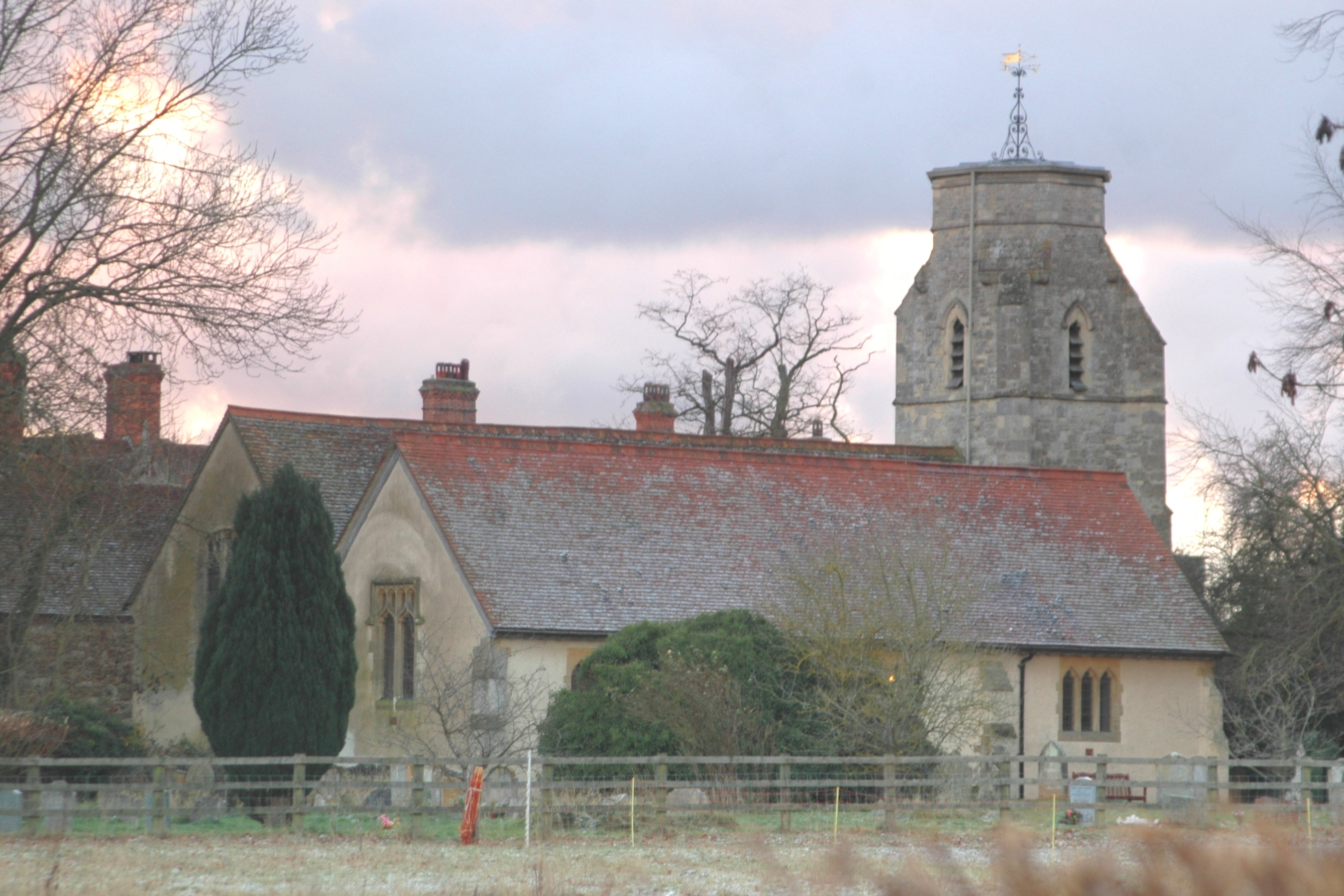
- St. Peter's parish church

- Location within Oxfordshire
- Area: 5.17 km^{2} (2.00 sq mi)
- Population: 275 (Parish, 2021)
  - Density: 53/km^{2} (140/sq mi)
- OS grid reference: SU5699
- Civil parish: Marsh Baldon
- District: South Oxfordshire
- Shire county: Oxfordshire
- Region: South East
- Country: England
- Sovereign state: United Kingdom
- Post town: Oxford
- Postcode district: OX44
- Dialling code: 01865
- Police: Thames Valley
- Fire: Oxfordshire
- Ambulance: South Central
- UK Parliament: Didcot and Wantage
- Website: Baldons Parish Council

Marsh Baldon is a village and civil parish about 5 miles (8 km) southeast of Oxford in Oxfordshire, England. The parish also includes the hamlet of Little Baldon. At the 2021 census the parish had a population of 275. Marsh Baldon shares a grouped parish council with the neighbouring parish of Toot Baldon.

== Archaeology ==
The course of the Roman road that linked Dorchester on Thames with Alchester passes through the parish on a north–south axis, and the eastern boundary of the village green approximately follows it. Roman coins and Romano-British pottery have been found in the parish. About 1 mile (1.6 km) south of the village, just east of the Golden Balls roundabout on the A4074 road, is the site of a set of Roman kilns. The site is now a scheduled monument.

== Manor ==
In the 11th century a Saxon called Azur (son of Toti) held a manor of 10 hides at Marsh Baldon. After the Norman Conquest of England this manor was one of numerous estates granted to Miles Crispin, a Norman baron who may have been the first castellan of Wallingford Castle. He held the village as tenant-in-chief, with the settlement being held directly by one Geoffrey of Baldon. Marsh Baldon remained part of the Honour of Wallingford until at least 1166. Baldon House was built in the 17th century or earlier as the manor house. It was extended in the 18th century, and wings were added in the 19th and early in the 20th centuries. Baldon House is a Grade II* listed building.

== Parish church ==
The Church of England parish church of Saint Peter dates from the 12th century, with 14th- and 15th-century alterations. St Peter's was restored in 1890 by Somers Clarke and John Thomas Micklethwaite. It is a Grade II* listed building. Above the south portal is a very fine example of a 12th-century canonical sundial. St Peter's 14th-century bell tower has a ring of five bells, the oldest of which was cast by John White of Reading in about 1480. Ellis I Knight of Reading cast two more, including the tenor bell, in about 1628. Mears and Stainbank of the Whitechapel Bell Foundry cast another bell in 1902 and finally the treble bell in 1954. There is also a Sanctus bell that was cast in about 1760 by Robert Wells of Aldbourne, Wiltshire.

In the north aisle is a painting of the Annunciation by the Italian master Pompeo Batoni (1708–87) after Guido Reni. It hung in the chapel of Corpus Christi College, Oxford until 1794, when Sir Christopher Willoughby had St Peter's Church remodelled and donated the painting. Marsh Baldon is not the only Oxfordshire parish church to have a painting by Batoni. The parish church of the Blessed Virgin Mary, Weston-on-the-Green, 12 miles (19 km) north of Marsh Baldon, has a Batoni altarpiece of the Ten Commandments.

The future Archbishop of Canterbury, Archibald Campbell Tait, as a young man, renowned for his Devotional dedication, added the arduous and financially unrewarding curacy of Baldon, to his tutorial responsibilities as soon as he was ordained.

== Economic and social history ==
Most of Marsh Baldon's houses and cottages are arranged around the village green, which is an irregular square shape with an area of around 23 acres (9.3 ha). The green is common land that was used for grazing. Until the 20th century the road through Marsh Baldon was gated at both ends of the village to prevent livestock from straying. It may be that the earliest settlement was clustered around St. Peter's church. The large green north-east of this original settlement would subsequently have been reclaimed from marshland early in the Middle Ages and then surrounded by houses.

== School ==
The parish has a Church of England primary school. It was founded at Toot Baldon in 1771, when Elizabeth Lane left the house and four acres of land at Herbert's Farm for the purpose. The farmhouse accommodated the schoolmaster, the four acres were for a site for the school and an orchard as its endowment. Elizabeth Lane's bequest funded free education for six boys and six girls; other families paid fees for the school to educate their children. By 1866 the school had 56 pupils. The present building at Marsh Baldon was erected in 1873 and a second classroom was added in 1897. In 1929 the school was reorganised for junior pupils only, with children over 11 years old going to the Church of England school at Dorchester on Thames from then onwards. The number of pupils enrolled in the reorganised school rose from 40 in 1929 to 52 in 1952.

== Amenities ==
Marsh Baldon has a public house, the Seven Stars. Marsh Baldon and Toot Baldon share a cricket club. In the southeast of the parish, next to the boundary with Nuneham Courtenay, are two woods: Old Common and Bluebell Wood. The latter contains Harcourt Arboretum, which is part of the University of Oxford's Botanic Garden.

== Governance ==
There are three tiers of local government covering Marsh Baldon, at parish, district and county level: Baldons Parish Council, South Oxfordshire District Council, and Oxfordshire County Council. The parish council is a grouped parish council, covering the two parishes of Marsh Baldon and Toot Baldon.

== Gallery ==
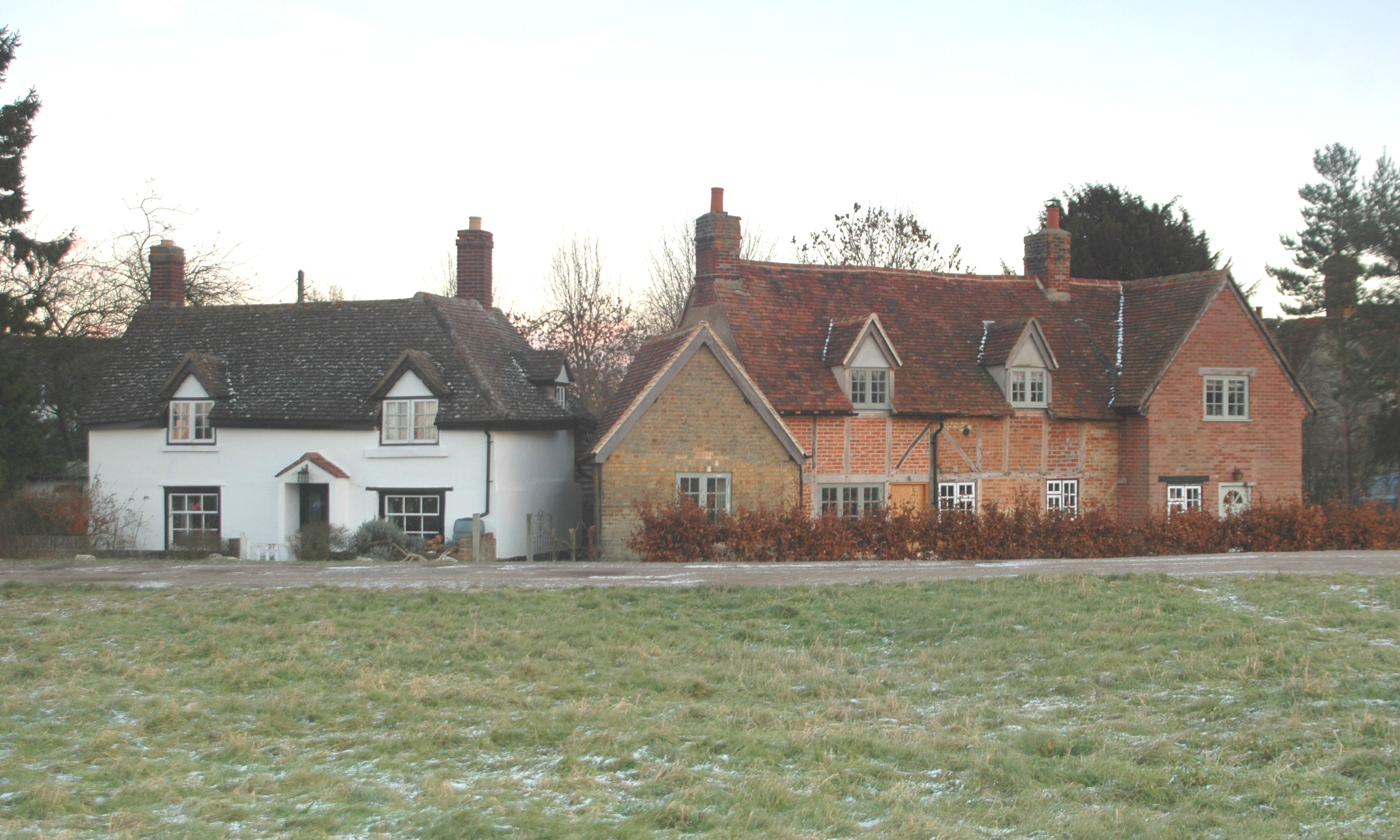
Late 17th or early 18th century vernacular cottages at 37–39 The Green

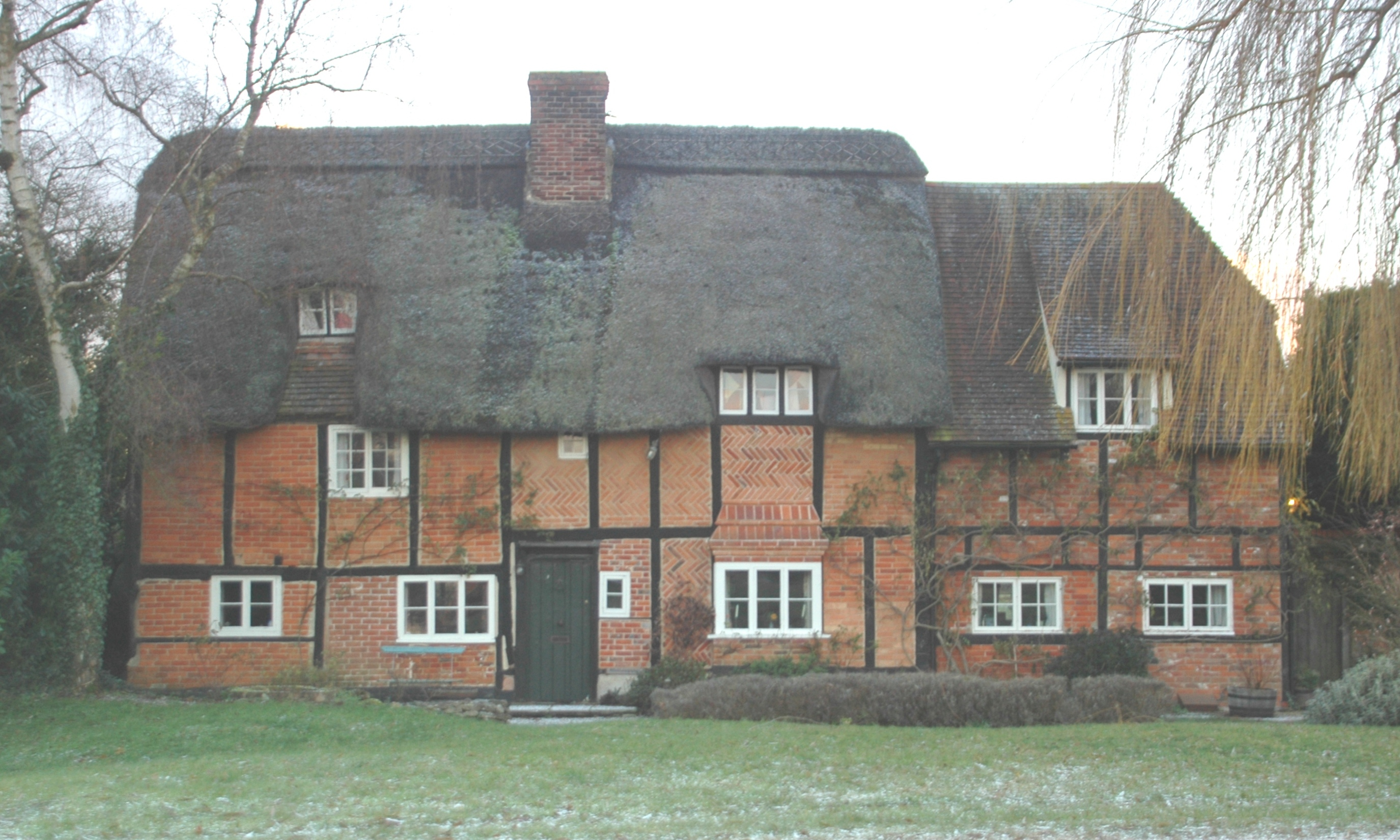
Vernacular thatched cottage overlooking The Green

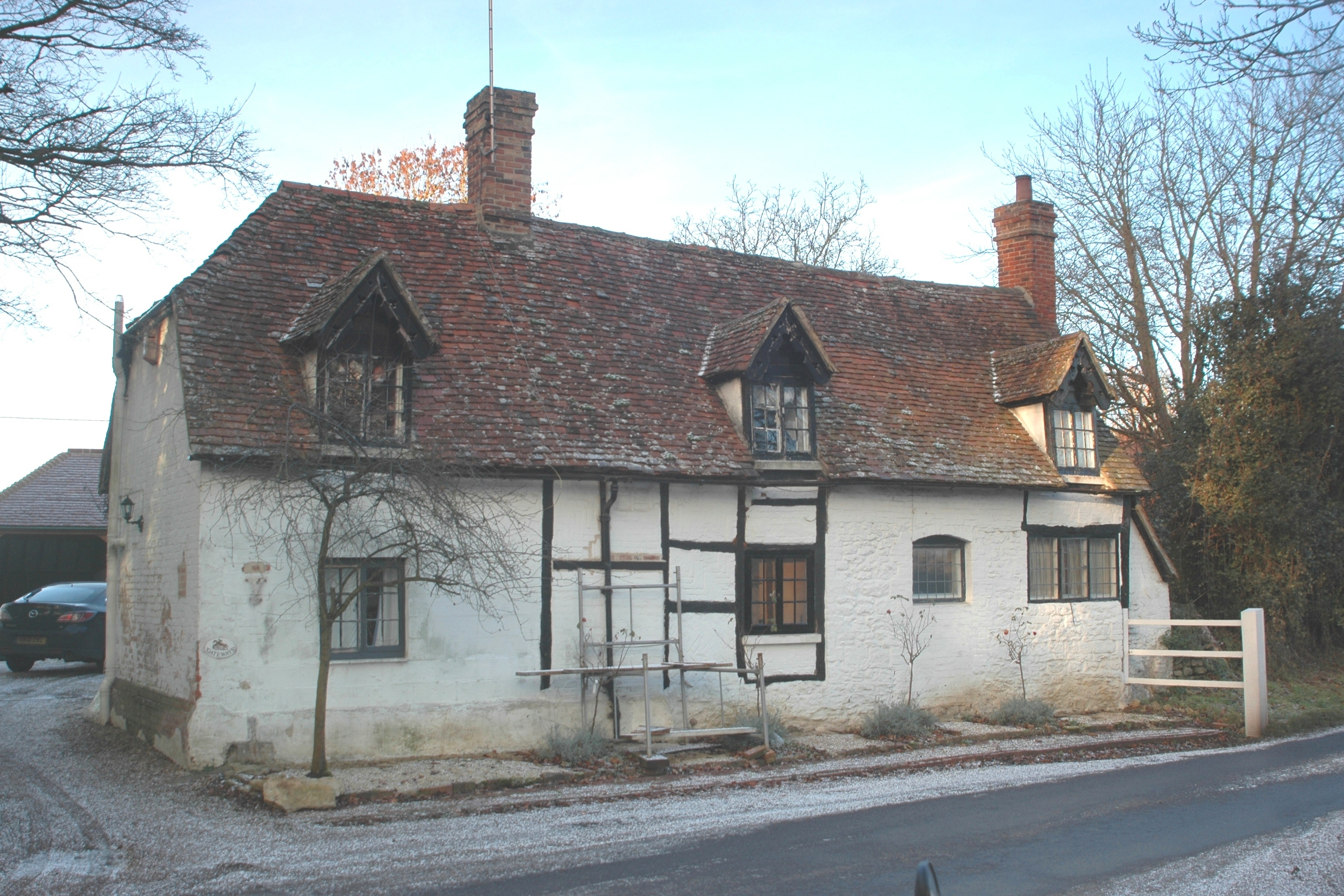
Gateways, a late 17th or early 18th century vernacular cottage in Baldon Lane

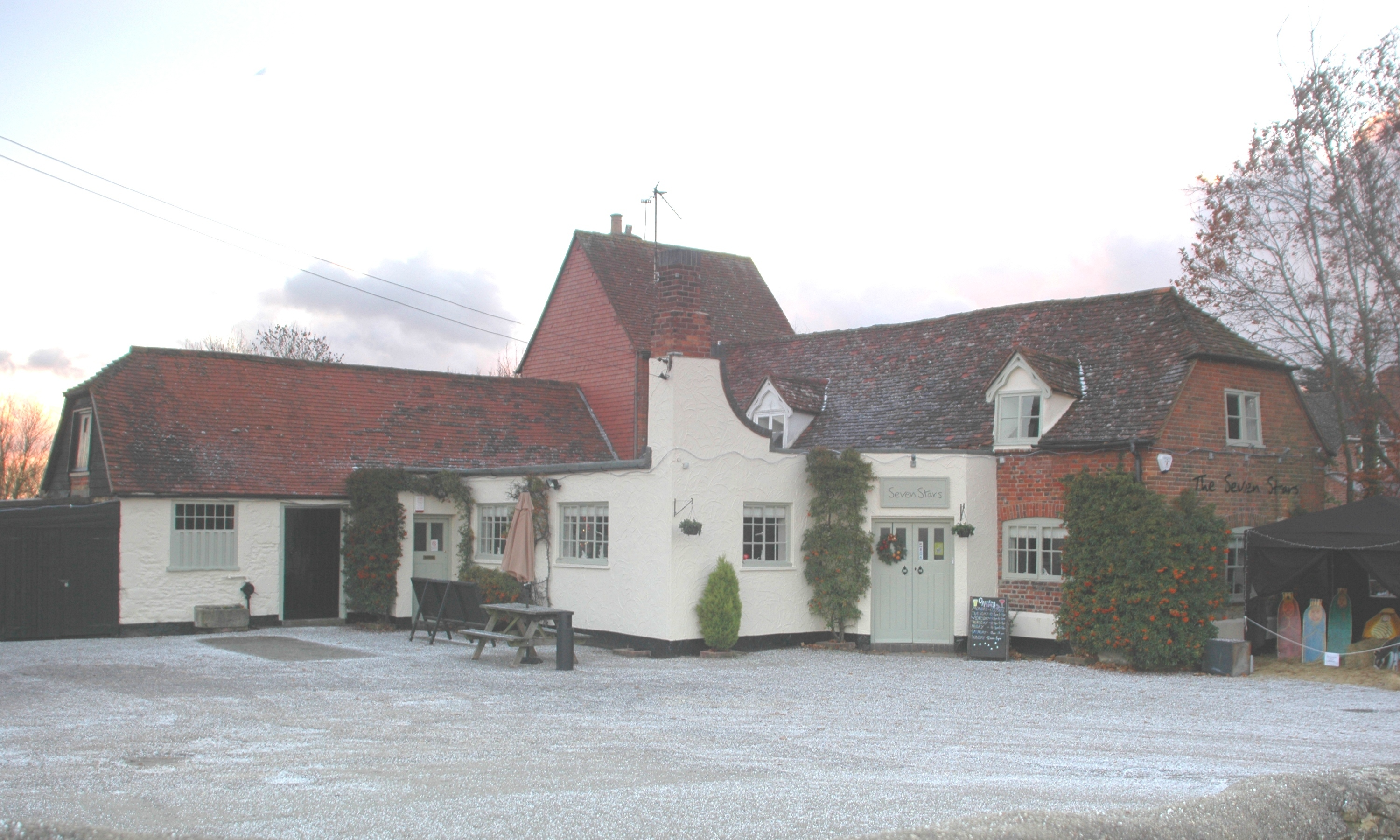
The Seven Stars public house

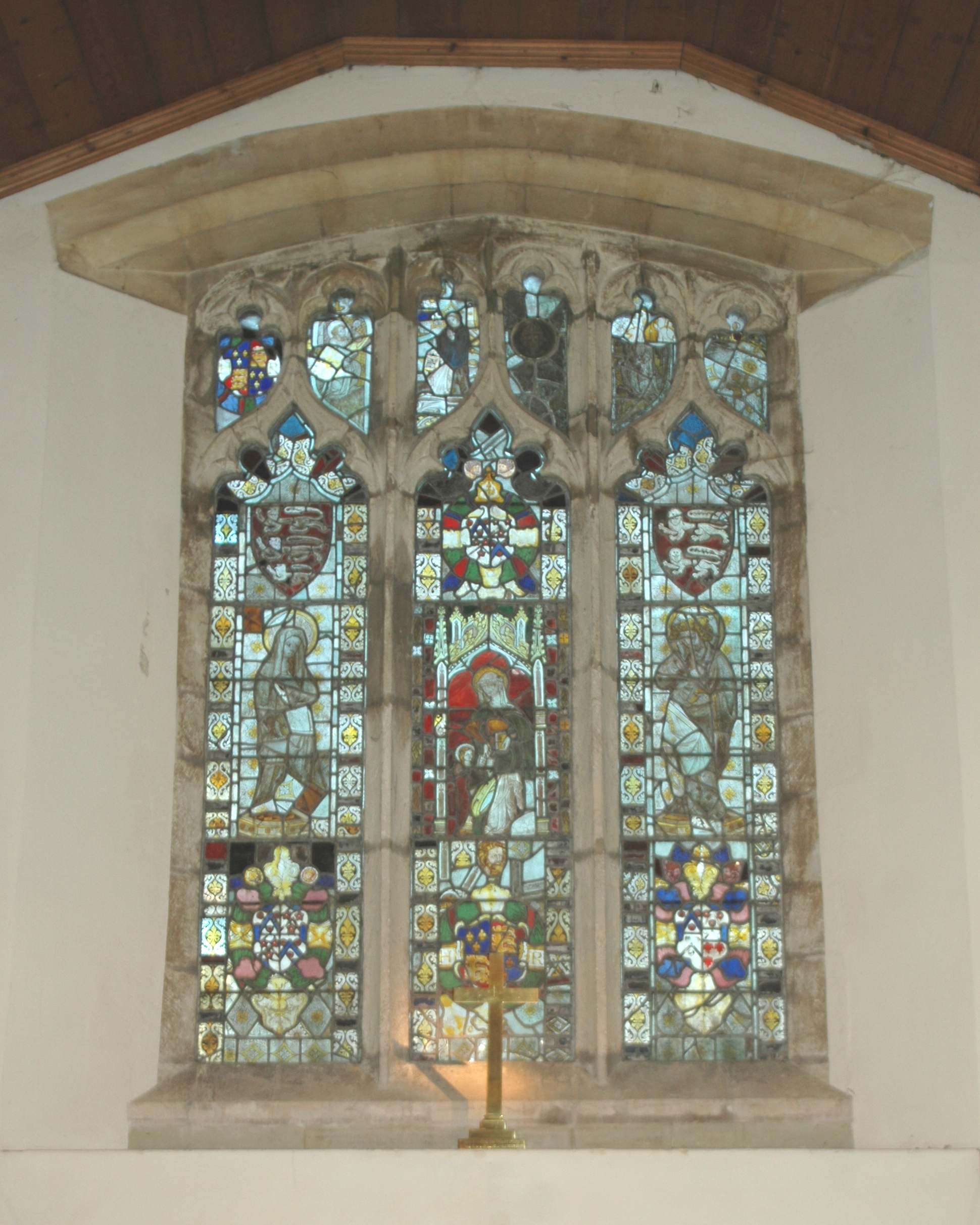
15th-century Perpendicular Gothic east window of St Peter's church

== Sources ==
- Lobel, Mary D, ed. (1957). A History of the County of Oxford: Volume 5: Bullingdon Hundred. Victoria County History. pp. 30–47.
- Rowley, Trevor (1978). Villages in the Landscape. Archaeology in the Field Series. London: J.M. Dent & Sons Ltd. pp. 33, 35. ISBN 0-460-04166-5.
- Sherwood, Jennifer; Pevsner, Nikolaus (1974). Oxfordshire. The Buildings of England. Harmondsworth: Penguin Books. pp. 698–699. ISBN 0-14-071045-0.
