= No. 511 Squadron RAF =

Defunct flying squadron of the Royal Air Force

- Active: 14 October 1942 – 7 October 1946; 16 October 1946 – 1 September 1958; 15 December 1959 – 6 January 1976
- Country: United Kingdom
- Branch: Royal Air Force
- Role: Transport
- Motto(s): Surely and Quickly

Insignia
- Squadron Badge heraldry: In front of a compass card, an eagle volant affrontée, the head lowered to the dexter holding in the claws a chain of five links This symbolises the squadrons function as a link between the five continents
- Squadron Codes: BC (unconfirmed)

No. 511 Squadron was a Royal Air Force transport squadron, active during World War II, the Berlin Airlift and during the sixties and early seventies. It operated, during its three periods of existence, aircraft such as the Douglas Dakota, the Avro York, the Handley Page Hastings and the Bristol Britannia.

== History ==
=== Second World War ===
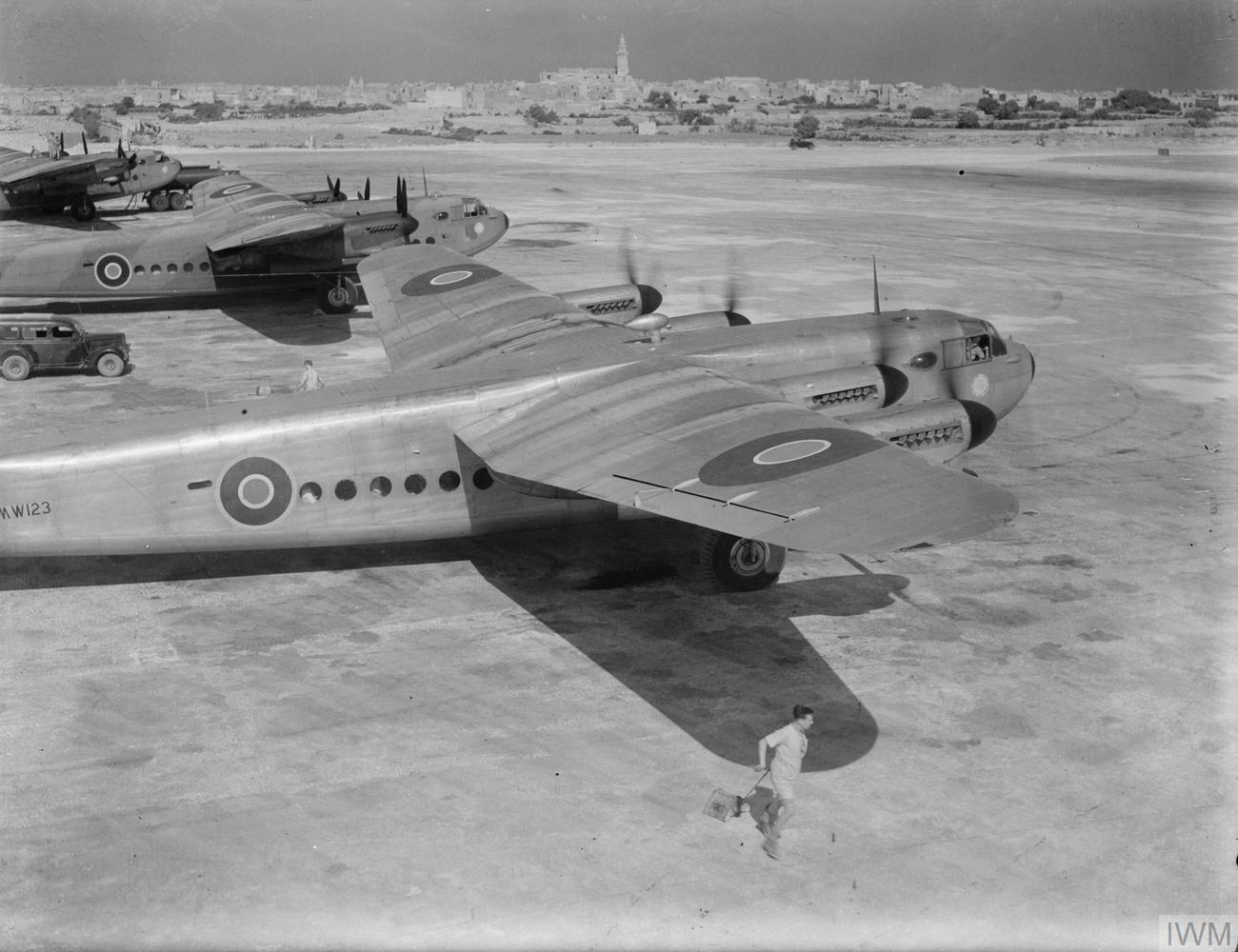
A 511 Sqn York CI on its way to the Far East at Luqa, Malta, 3 August 1945.

Formed on 14 October 1942, No. 511 Squadron was formed from No. 1425 Flight at RAF Lyneham. The squadron continued the work of the Flight operating regular transport schedules to Gibraltar using the Consolidated Liberators. To extend the route from Gibraltar to Malta the squadron also operated the Armstrong Whitworth Albemarle. As the Second World War progressed, no. 511 Squadron expanded its long-range transport role and it was the first squadron to operate the Avro York transport (A transport based on the Avro Lancaster). At first the Liberators and Yorks were operated as separate Flights, but the Liberator Flight became 246 Squadron in 1944. The squadron continued to fly trooping flights, particularly between the United Kingdom and India until the squadron was disbanded on 7 October 1946.

=== Post-war 1: On Yorks and Hastings ===
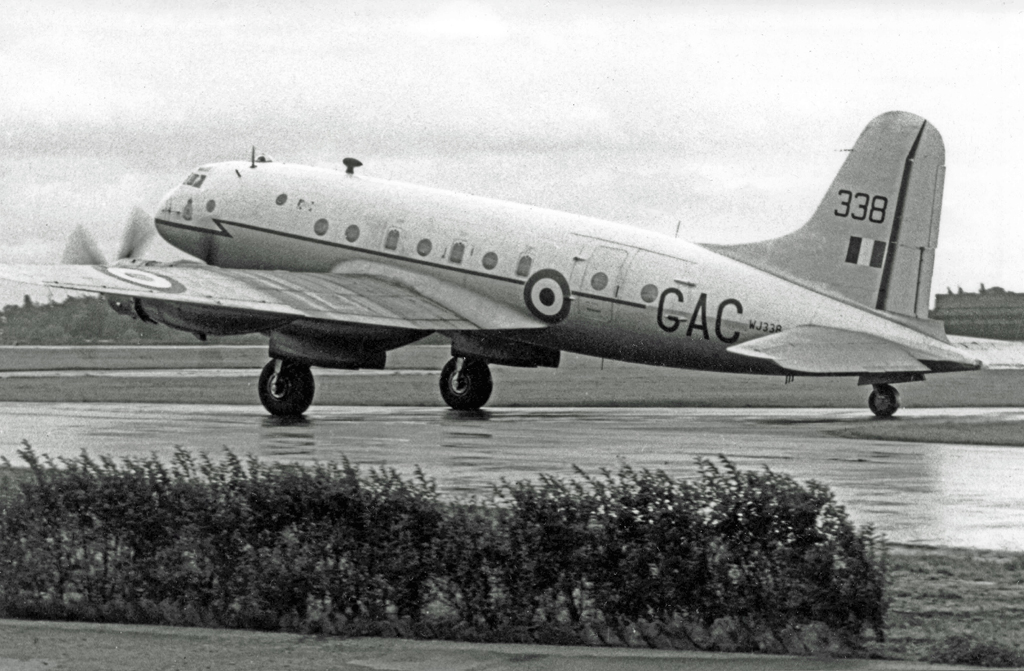
Hastings C.2 of No. 511 Squadron at Manchester Airport in 1952.

Within a few days (16 October 1946) the squadron was formed again as an Avro York operator based at RAF Lyneham. It continued to fly the long-distance routes to India and the Far East until, like a lot of transport squadrons, it became involved in the Berlin Airlift.

The squadron was then re-equipped with the Handley Page Hastings in September 1949 and in 1957 the squadron moved to join other operators of the Hastings at RAF Colerne. A year later the squadron disbanded when it was re-numbered to 36 Squadron on 1 September 1958.

=== Post-war 2: Comes the Britannia ===
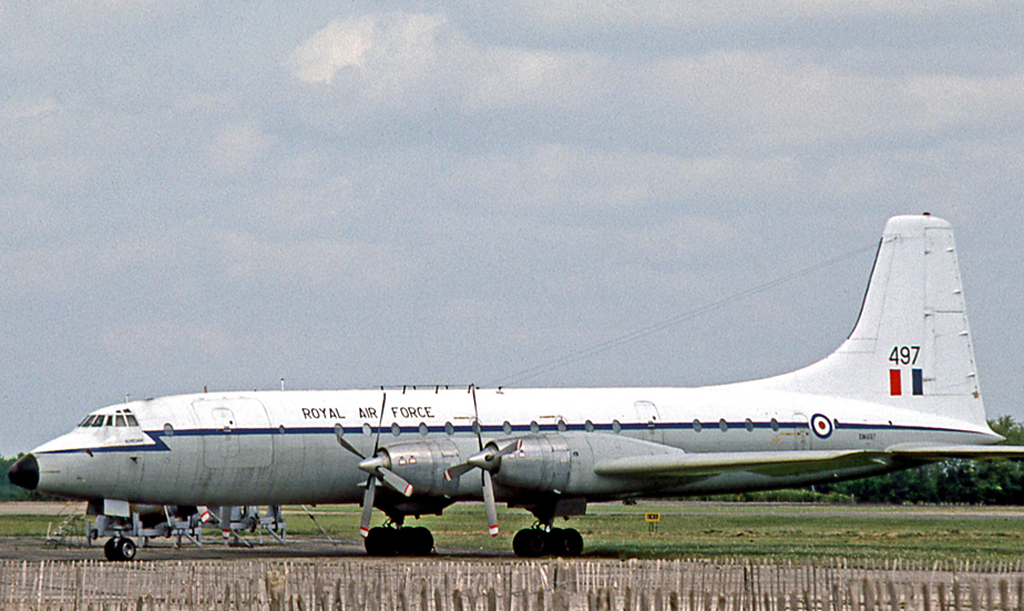
Bristol Britannia C.1 of 511 Squadron in 1976.

The squadron was formed again at RAF Lyneham on 15 December 1959, as the second squadron to operate the Bristol Britannia on long-range trooping flights. It moved out of RAF Lyneham for RAF Brize Norton in June 1970, as Lyneham became the base for the new Lockheed C-130 Hercules. The squadron was disbanded on 6 January 1976, when it was decided to withdraw the Britannia from service.

== Aircraft operated ==
Aircraft operated by no. 511 Squadron RAF, data from
From	To	Aircraft	Version
October 1942	March 1944	Consolidated Liberator	Mk.I
October 1942	July 1944	Consolidated Liberator	Mk.II
November 1942	March 1944	Armstrong Whitworth Albemarle	Mk.I
December 1942	December 1942	Handley Page Halifax	Mk.II
September 1943	July 1944	Douglas Dakota	Mks.I, III
November 1943	October 1946	Avro York	Mk.I
July 1944	December 1944	Consolidated Liberator	Mk.VII
October 1945	April 1946	Avro Lancastrian	C.2
October 1946	September 1949	Avro York	C.1
September 1949	September 1958	Handley Page Hastings	C.1
May 1952	September 1958	Handley Page Hastings	C.2
December 1959	January 1976	Bristol Britannia	C.1 & C.2

== Squadron bases ==
Bases and airfields used by no. 511 Squadron RAF, data from
From	To	Base	Remark
10 October 1942	7 October 1946	RAF Lyneham, Wiltshire	Dets. at RAF Gibraltar; RCAF Dorval, Canada and RAF Northolt, Middlesex
16 October 1946	1 May 1957	RAF Lyneham, Wiltshire	Det. at RAF Wunstorf, Germany for Berlin Airlift
1 May 1957	1 September 1958	RAF Colerne, Wiltshire	
15 December 1959	16 June 1970	RAF Lyneham, Wiltshire	
16 June 1970	6 January 1976	RAF Brize Norton, Oxfordshire	

== Commanding officers ==
Officers commanding no. 511 Squadron RAF, data from
From	To	Name
October 1942	March 1943	W/Cdr. W.J. Pickard
March 1943	June 1943	W/Cdr. J.N. Glover
June 1943	June 1944	W/Cdr. C.E. Slee, MVO, AFC
June 1944	August 1945	W/Cdr. E.W. Whitaker, DFC, AFC
September 1945	October 1946	W/Cdr. S.W.R. Hughes, OBE
October 1946	January 1948	W/cdr. R.J. Burrough, DFC
January 1948	January 1950	S/Ldr. G.H. Smith
January 1950	April 1952	S/Ldr. M.C.S. Haycroft
April 1952	May 1954	S/Ldr. Langdon
May 1954	June 1956	S/Ldr. R.E. Dyson, DFC
June 1956	May 1958	S/Ldr. G.W. Turner
May 1958	September 1958	S/Ldr. WL. Green
December 1959		W/Cdr. A.W.G. Le Hardy
		W/Cdr. J.H. Lewis
	June 1972	W/Cdr. P.A. Ward
June 1972	July 1974	W/Cdr. R.J. Hutchings
July 1974	January 1976	W/Cdr. R.G. Robertson

== See also ==
- 1943 B-24 crash in Gibraltar
- List of Royal Air Force aircraft squadrons
