= Little Baldon air crash =

1965 air crash in the United Kingdom

Coordinates: 51°40′38.64″N 1°10′51.71″W

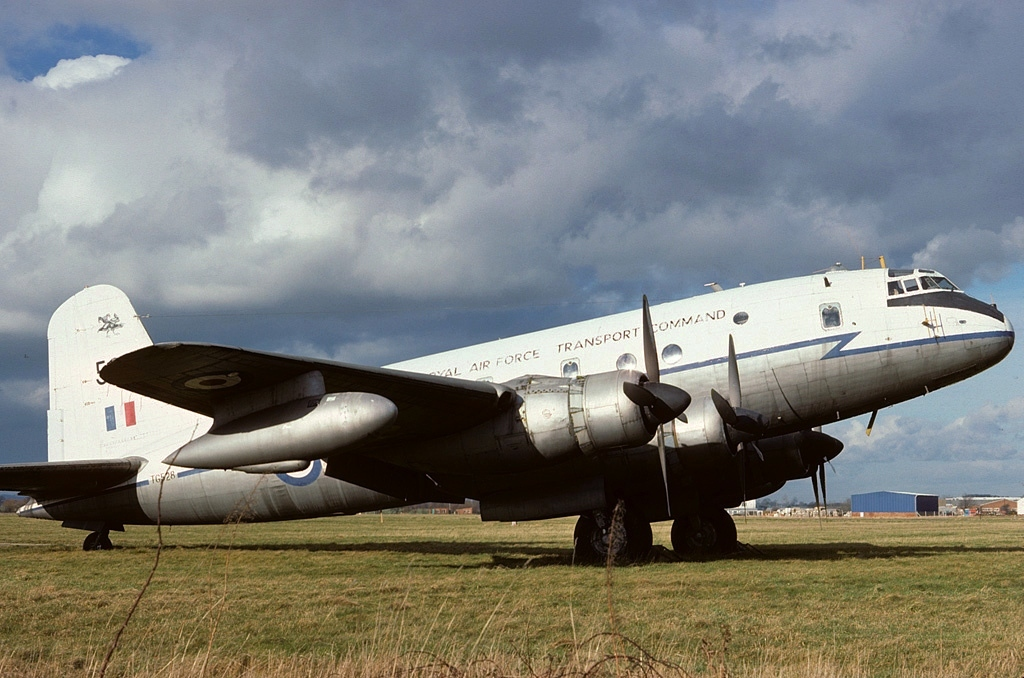
- A Handley Page Hastings C1A, the same variant as TG577 which crashed

Accident
- Date: 6 July 1965
- Summary: Mechanical fault due to metal fatigue
- Site: Little Baldon, Oxfordshire, England, United Kingdom

Aircraft
- Aircraft type: Handley Page Hastings
- Operator: Royal Air Force
- Registration: TG577
- Flight origin: RAF Abingdon, England
- Destination: RAF Benson, England
- Passengers: 35
- Crew: 6
- Fatalities: 41
- Survivors: 0

The Little Baldon air crash occurred on 6 July 1965 when a Handley Page Hastings C1A transport aircraft operated by No. 36 Squadron Royal Air Force, registration TG577, crashed into a field in Little Baldon, near Chiselhampton, Oxfordshire, shortly after taking off from RAF Abingdon. The flight was captained by Flt Lt John Akin. All 41 people aboard, including six crew, died in the crash, making it the third worst air crash in the United Kingdom at the time.

A subsequent inquest jury returned a verdict of accidental death. The inquest found that the accident was due to metal fatigue of two bolts in the elevator system.

== Flight history ==
On the day of the accident the Hastings flew from its base at RAF Colerne, Wiltshire, to RAF Abingdon, where it picked up a number of parachutists undergoing a short voluntary parachute course. The intention was to drop them over RAF Weston-on-the-Green, after which the aircraft would land at RAF Benson. There were 24 RAF and 11 Army passengers. They included eight RAF parachute jump instructors, three RAF air loadmasters, 13 other members of the RAF, three senior NCOs from the Parachute Regiment (two of them members of the Territorial Army), and seven Parachute Regiment recruits and a Royal Artillery gunner from the Airborne Forces Depot at Aldershot. Two of the instructors were members of the RAF Falcons parachute display team.

The Hastings took off from Abingdon about 1600 BST. One eyewitness reported it flying in company with two RAF Armstrong Whitworth AW.660 Argosy heavy transport aircraft. Eyewitnesses in the village of Berinsfield reported seeing it fly over, then lose height or dive. They reported the aircraft "weaving from side to side", "its wings wiggled" or "its tail wobbled" before the Hastings climbed steeply out of control. It then fell with all four engines still running and crashed into a field at Little Baldon called Hundred Acres, about 4 1/2 miles (7 km) east of Abingdon and 6 miles (10 km) southeast of Oxford. The aircraft hit the ground on its back and burst into a ball of flame, killing all six crew and all 35 passengers. It was reported from RAF Abingdon that the pilot, Flight Lieutenant John Akin, had radioed that his aircraft was having control trouble before the radio went dead.

The first people to arrive on the scene included Arthur Ware, one of the occupants of Little Baldon Farm Cottages, and George Powell, a farm foreman. Ware said:

"I found wreckage scattered all over the place. I saw many bodies, and a helmet like the ones used by paratroops coloured bright red. Some of them looked as if they had tried to jump. I could see collapsed parachutes with the cords at full stretch. I could see there was nothing I could do for anyone."

Another witness was Lily Pearce of Chiselhampton, who saw the crash from her garden at Marylands Green, about 400 yards (370 m) from the site. She called her husband Frederick, who in the Second World War had been a member of an RAF crash rescue team. He said:

"I ran across the field but when I got to it, it was obvious no-one could have got out alive. It was just hopeless. Bodies and wreckage were scattered everywhere; flames were still pouring from the wreckage."

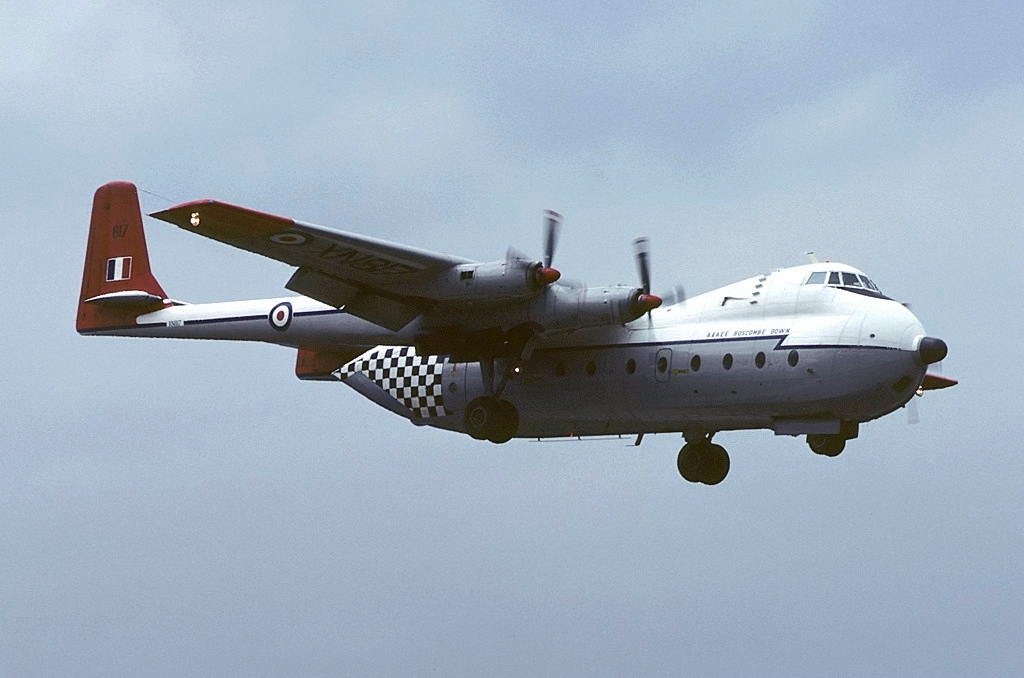
An RAF Armstrong Whitworth AW.660 Argosy like the two that circled the crash site

A search for survivors was hampered by a tall crop of barley. The two Argosy aircraft circled the crash site for almost an hour. They were joined by helicopters from RAF Benson, including one from the Queen's Flight.

The first civilian police and fire crews reached the scene within minutes, and were joined by RAF fire crews from Abingdon and Benson and other personnel. Civilian fire appliances came from three fire brigades: Berkshire at Abingdon and Didcot, City of Oxford at Oxford, and Oxfordshire at Watlington.

== Aftermath ==
Her Majesty the Queen sent a message of sympathy to the next of kin. The Secretary of State for Defence, Denis Healey, expressed deep sympathy on behalf of the House of Commons. There were many other messages of sympathy, including from the Lord Lieutenant of Oxfordshire, Abingdon MP Airey Neave and the Mayor of Abingdon.

Eight of the dead had been living locally: two in Oxfordshire and six in what was then north Berkshire. Flt Lt Akin, originally from Headington in Oxford, lived in Bathford in Somerset and was based at RAF Colerne and one of the trainees was based at RAF Bicester. Four of the instructors lived in Abingdon, one lived in Radley and one in Wantage.

The day after the crash an investigation and an inquest were opened at RAF Abingdon. The Coroner for North Berkshire, Norman Challoner, opened and adjourned the inquest into the 41 deaths. The Air Accidents Investigation Branch convened a five-member board of inquiry at the airfield and started examining the wreckage at Little Baldon. A team from RAF Bicester arrived at the site and began salvage and recovery work.

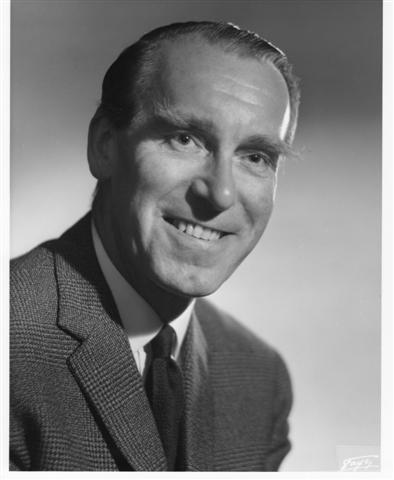
Henley MP John Hay, who called for the AAIB inquiry to be held in public

Little Baldon is in the Henley parliamentary constituency. In the House of Commons, Henley MP John Hay proposed that because of the great loss of life and public anxiety, the board of inquiry should be held in public. Denis Healey replied that "there are juridical obstacles to the inquiry being in public", but added "I will make the fullest possible statement about the findings of the inquiry as soon as I possibly can".

=== Grounding ===
The day after the crash the RAF continued to fly Hastings aircraft, including from Abingdon. However, within a few days of the accident the investigation found a fractured bolt in the elevator control system (see below) and the Ministry of Defence grounded all 80 operational Hastings. The grounding brought forward the retirement of this type of aircraft, and its replacement with the Lockheed Hercules within a few years of the accident.

=== Findings ===
The subsequent inquest was told that the accident was due to metal fatigue of two bolts in the elevator system. The failure of these two upper bolts would apply a force on the starboard bracket causing the corresponding lower bolts to also fail. This would cause a portion of the elevator to fail. The aircraft had flown 2,400 hours since it was last refurbished which the technical expert said was not excessive. Eyewitnesses had reported the aircraft climbed near-vertically before one wing dropped and it dived vertically into the field. The inquest jury returned a verdict of accidental death with a statement from the foreman "We trust that every precaution will be taken in the future".

== Monument ==
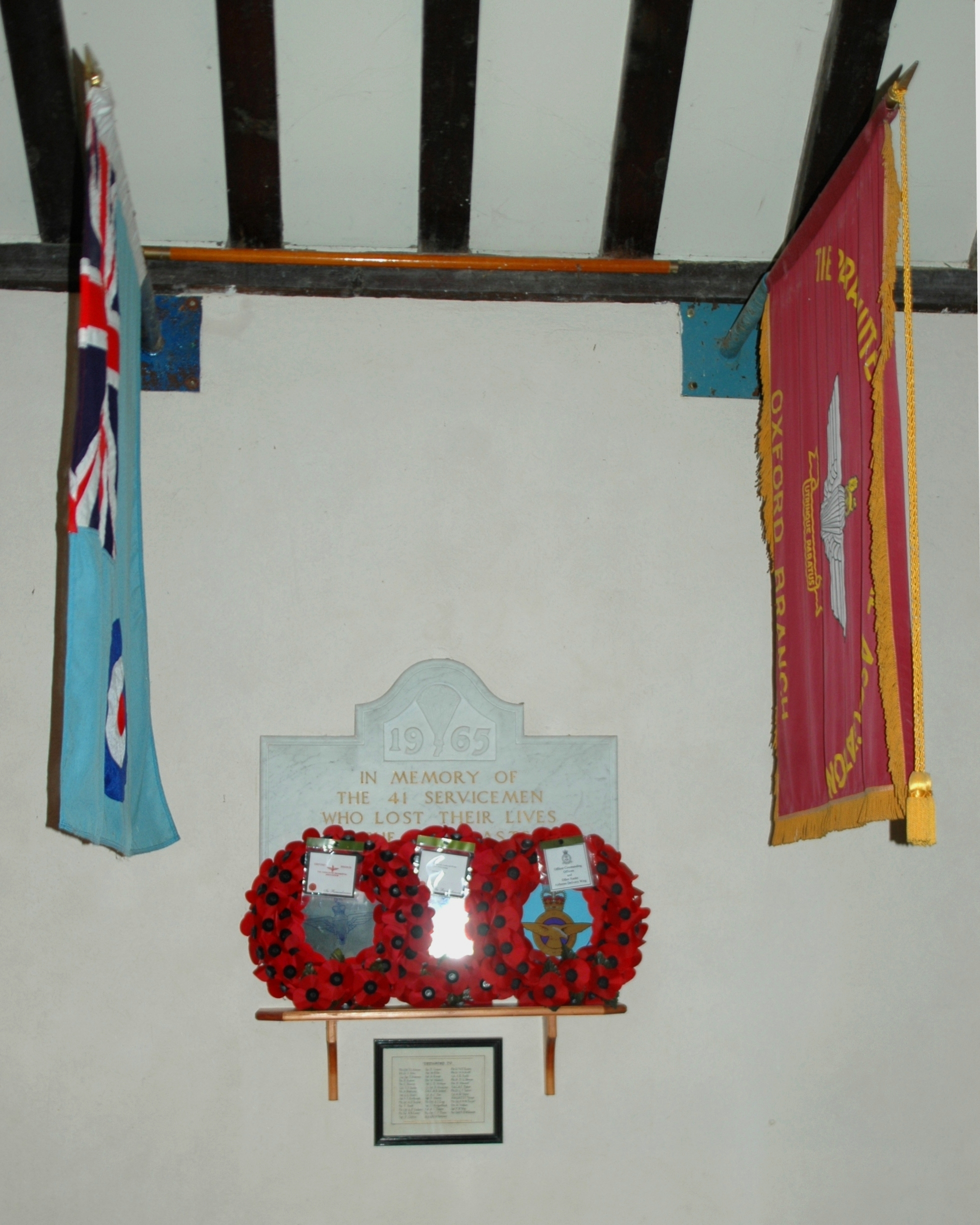
Monument in St Lawrence's parish church, Toot Baldon

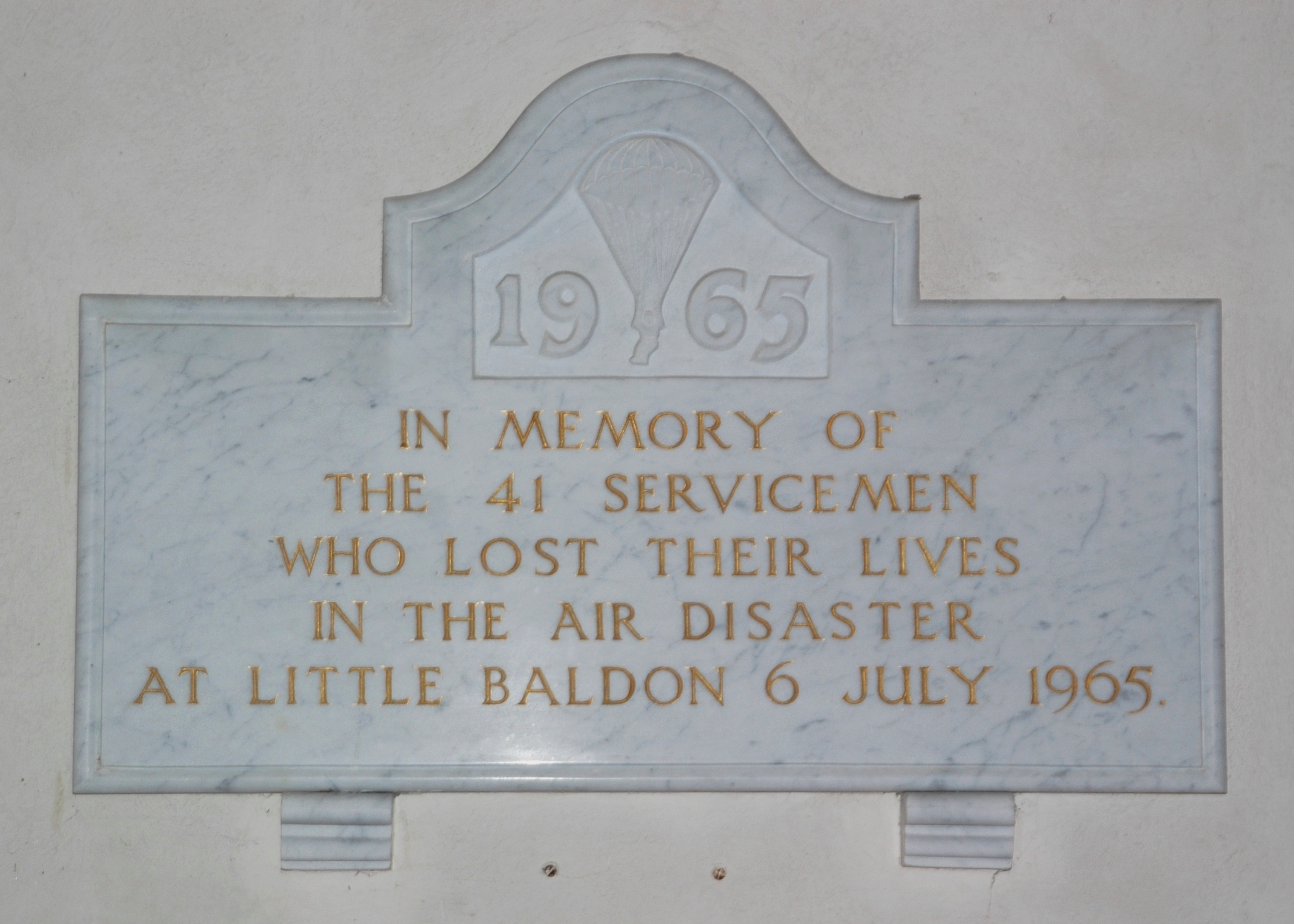
Close up of the Monument in St Lawrence's parish church

On Sunday 9 April 1967 a wall-mounted marble monument to the victims in the Church of England parish church of St Lawrence, Toot Baldon was dedicated at a special service. There is a small roll of honour beneath, and an RAF ensign and a standard of the Oxford Branch of the Parachute Regimental Association flank the monument. Wreaths are laid at the monument during an annual commemorative service at the church, usually on the first Sunday in July.

== See also ==
- 1965 in aviation
- Sutton Wick air crash, in which a Blackburn Beverley crashed 2 miles (3 km) south of Abingdon in 1957.
