= Toot Baldon =

Village in Oxfordshire, England

Coordinates: 51.703°N 01.180°W

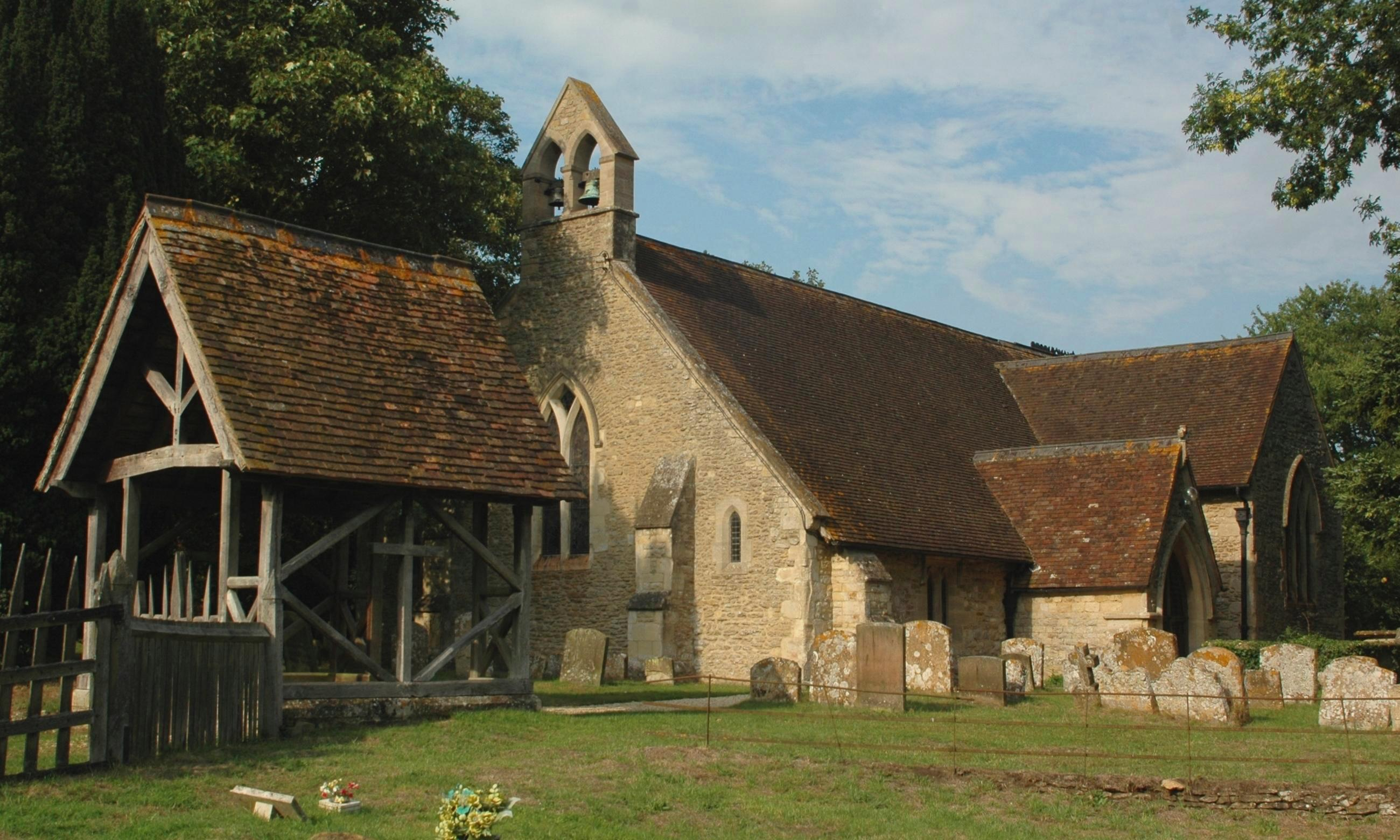
- St Lawrence's parish church

- Location within Oxfordshire
- Area: 4.48 km^{2} (1.73 sq mi)
- Population: 140 (Parish, 2021)
  - Density: 31/km^{2} (80/sq mi)
- OS grid reference: SP5600
- Civil parish: Toot Baldon
- District: South Oxfordshire
- Shire county: Oxfordshire
- Region: South East
- Country: England
- Sovereign state: United Kingdom
- Post town: Oxford
- Postcode district: OX44
- Dialling code: 01865
- Police: Thames Valley
- Fire: Oxfordshire
- Ambulance: South Central
- UK Parliament: Didcot and Wantage
- Website: Baldons Parish Council

Toot Baldon is a village and civil parish about 5 miles (8 km) southeast of Oxford in Oxfordshire. At the 2021 census the parish had a population of 140. Toot Baldon shares a grouped parish council with the neighbouring parish of Marsh Baldon.

== Toponym ==
"Toot" is derived from an Old English word for "a look-out place". "Baldon" is derived from the Old English for "Bealda's Hill".

== History ==
The Church of England parish church of Saint Lawrence was built mostly in the 13th century. It was restored to designs by the Gothic Revival architect Henry Woodyer in 1865. The church is a Grade II* listed building. There is a monument to the 1965 Little Baldon air crash in the north aisle of the church. Court House Farm is partly 16th century. Toot Baldon manor house was built in the 17th century and is Grade II* listed. A parish school was built in the 19th or early 20th century. It has since closed and the building is now a private house.

== Amenities ==
Toot Baldon has a pub. It used to be the Crown but is now called the Mole Inn. Toot Baldon and Marsh Baldon share a cricket club.

== Governance ==
There are three tiers of local government covering Toot Baldon, at parish, district and county level: Baldons Parish Council, South Oxfordshire District Council, and Oxfordshire County Council. The parish council is a grouped parish council, covering the two parishes of Toot Baldon and Marsh Baldon.

== Sources ==
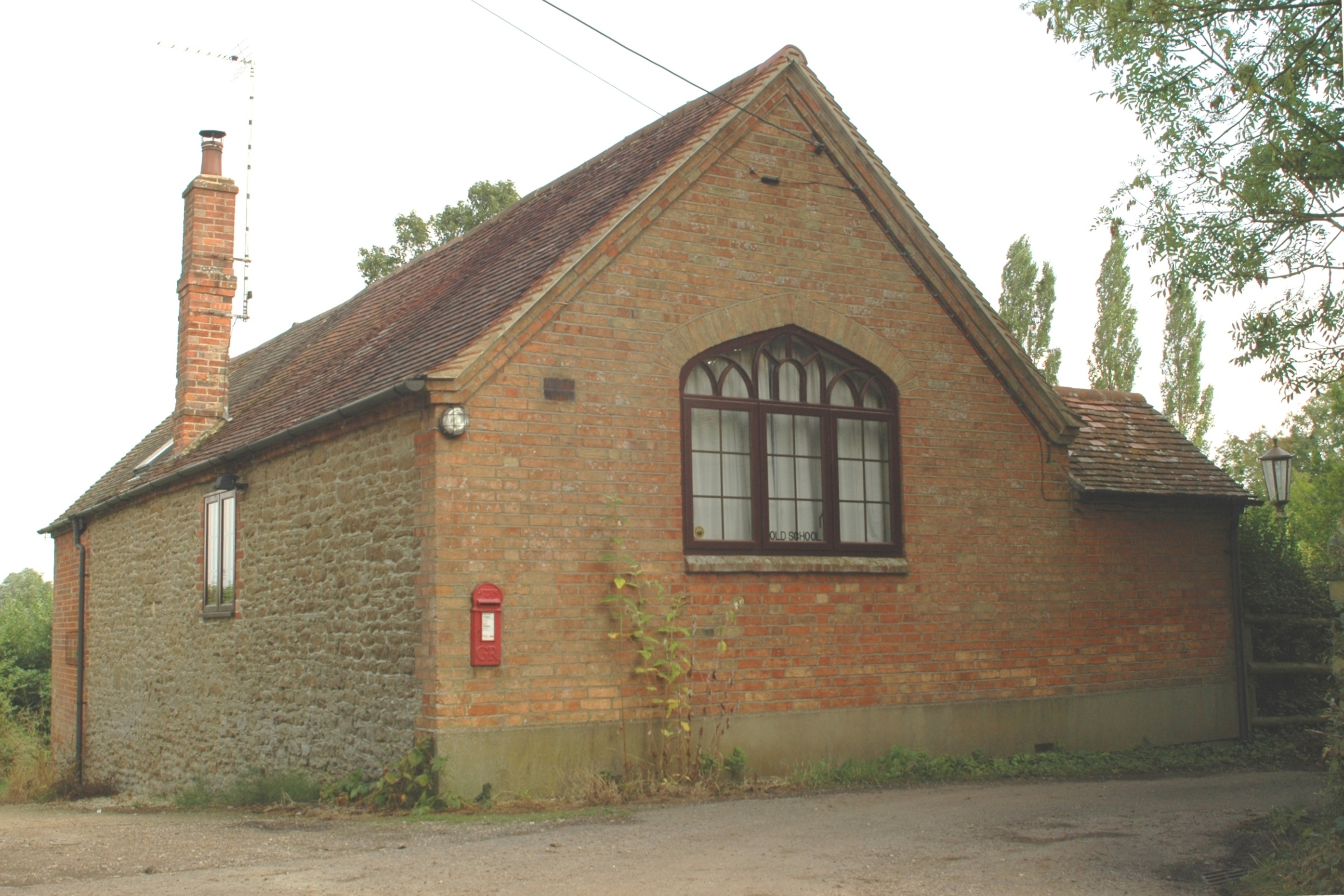
Former parish school

- Alexander, Henry (1912). The Place-Names of Oxfordshire, their origin and development. Oxford: Clarendon Press. pp. 46, 209.
- Lobel, Mary D, ed. (1957). A History of the County of Oxford. Victoria County History. Vol. 5: Bullingdon Hundred. London: Oxford University Press for the Institute of Historical Research. pp. 47–56.
- Sherwood, Jennifer; Pevsner, Nikolaus (1974). Oxfordshire. The Buildings of England. Harmondsworth: Penguin Books. pp. 818–819. ISBN 0-14-071045-0.
