= Kingham (disambiguation) =

Kingham may refer to:

== Places ==
- Kingham in Oxfordshire, United Kingdom
- Kingham Hill School in Oxfordshire, United Kingdom
- Kingham railway station in Oxfordshire, United Kingdom

== People ==
- Henry Kingham, British footballer
- Jonathan Kingham, American musician
- Nolan Kingham, American baseball player
- Tess Kingham, British politician

== Other ==
- HMS Kingham (M2704), a minesweeper of the British Royal Navy
- Lorraine Kingham, a fictional character on the TV show Neighbours
