= Chipping Norton Railway =

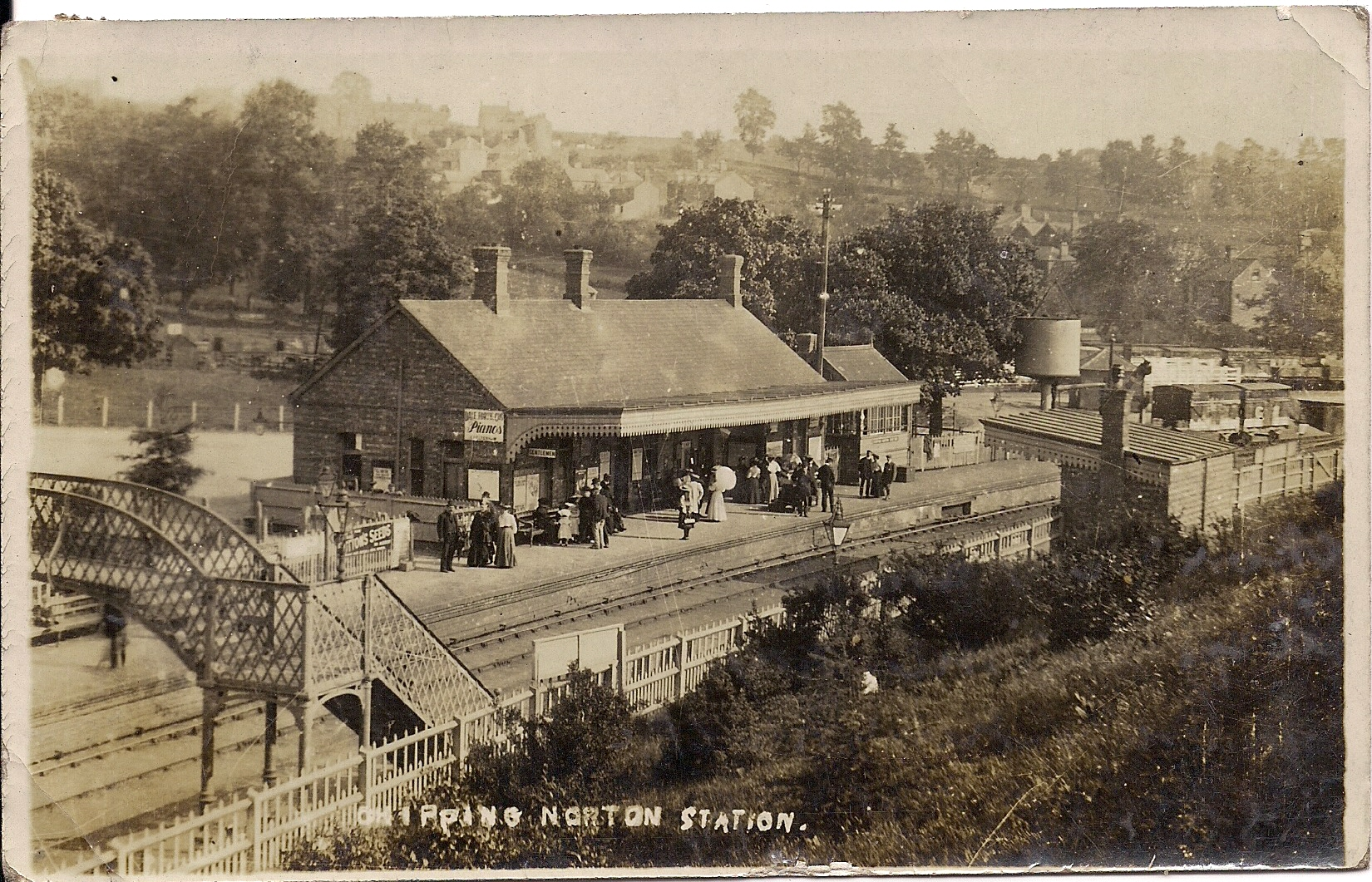
Chipping Norton railway station

The Chipping Norton Railway opened in 1855, first linking the town of Chipping Norton with the Oxford, Worcester and Wolverhampton Railway (OW&W) at Kingham station, with a single station in the form of Sarsden Halt initially located on the route.

== History ==
William Bliss, owner of Bliss's Tweed Mills, realised the railway could be useful to him in allowing not only for his cloth products to be taken to buyers, but also for coal to be brought to the mills, which at the time used water power instead of steam. Bliss wrote to the Oxford, Worcester, and Wolverhampton Railway in 1846 to ask for a railway link to Chipping Norton, but this did not yield results. He wrote again to the railway company in September 1847, asking for a "passenger station at Bleddington Mill". A meeting held at the Red Lion pub, Banbury, on 21 April 1851 promoted a railway to connect Banbury with the OW&W's route: this line ran further north than the Chipping Norton Railway would eventually run.

A different project to that discussed in Banbury in 1851 was the "East & West of England Junction Railway", designed to leave the OW&Ws line at Bruern Crossing (which was as yet unbuilt), before joining the route which was to be later used for the Chipping Norton Railway. In 1853, William Bliss, accompanied by Mr Wilkins of Chipping Norton, led a deputation to the OW&W with a request to have a station constructed at Bledington: this was refused, with representatives from the railway company being sent to explain their reasoning. Bliss and Robert Hitchman, of Hitchman's Breweries, decided to get the railway line built themselves. Bliss met with Sir Samuel Moreton Peto in 1854 and discussed the matter of the railway.

Construction on the Chipping Norton Railway began in September 1854 by Peto & Betts. John Fowler was the engineer. The line was completed by Whit Monday 1855. The line joined the existing OW&W route at Chipping Norton Junction (now Kingham) station. It used the standard gauge of 4 ft 8+1/2 in (1,435mm). Sir Samuel Moreton Peto (of Peto & Betts) put £14,000 of his own money towards building the railway; another £12,000 was raised by subscription list from the inhabitants of Chipping Norton and the area by William Bliss to meet the total price estimate of £26,000.

The Chipping Norton Railway was purchased by the OW&W after the latter deemed the railway financially sound in 1859. That year also saw Parliament pass a Bill for an extension of six miles from Chipping Norton Junction to Bourton-on-the-Water, with a station being provided for Stow-on-the-Wold. The West Midland Railway absorbed the OW&W in 1860, and in 1862 trains began running between Bourton and Chipping Norton Junction (despite the new stations not yet being finished).

In 1864, a proposal was made by John Fowler and Edward Wilson for an extension to the Chipping Norton Railway which would run through Swerford (instead of the route through Hook Norton eventually taken by the railway). This proposal also saw the extension connect to the Great Western Railway route one mile closer to Banbury than that which was eventually built.

An extension to the Chipping Norton Railway between Chipping Norton and Kings Sutton opened on 6 April 1887. The cost of building the tunnel and two viaducts at Hook Norton was £25,000. A flyover was constructed at Chipping Norton Junction in 1906, allowing for trains to run through from Banbury to Cheltenham without having to stop and reverse at the station. The new stations on the extension were Rollright Halt, Hook Norton, Bloxham, and Adderbury. Stations were planned for Edward's Lime Kiln, Charlton Kings, and Great Rollright, but the former was not served.

The Great Western Railway had, according to J.H. Russell, "already agreed to work the line in perpetuity" by 1875.

== World War Two ==
World War Two saw many children from London being evacuated to small towns and villages in the countryside. Chipping Norton was one such place, and trains brought children from Acton and Ealing Broadway to places such as Oxford and Chipping Norton. These trains were some of the longest to have ever used the platforms at the station at Chipping Norton.

== Closure ==
The line between Kingham and Chipping Norton is listed in the 1963 Beeching Report as being "under Consideration for Withdrawal before the Formulation of the Report", and that withdrawal was "already implemented". The final passenger train ran on the line on 1 December 1962. Freight traffic ended in 1964 and the line was then removed.

== Modern day ==
The site that was once occupied by the station and goods yard is now part of an industrial estate, and only the cattle shed remains. The tunnel through the hill and bridge for the road still exist, but the tunnel has been closed and has become flooded due to the filling-in of the bridge.
