= Kingham =

Village in Oxfordshire, England

Coordinates: 51.905°N 1.614°W

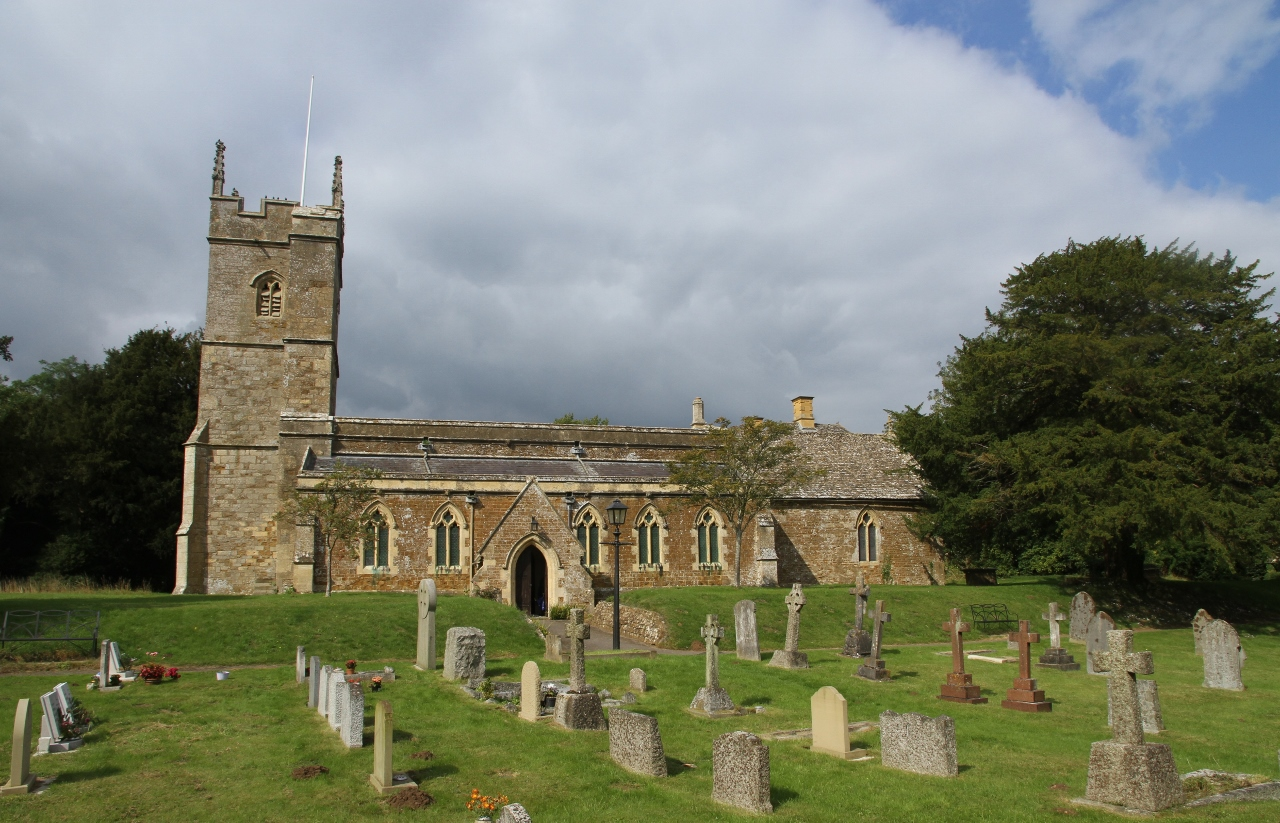
- St Andrew's parish church

- Location within Oxfordshire
- Population: 913 (2011 Census)
- OS grid reference: SP2624
- Civil parish: Kingham
- District: West Oxfordshire
- Shire county: Oxfordshire
- Region: South East
- Country: England
- Sovereign state: United Kingdom
- Post town: Chipping Norton
- Postcode district: OX7
- Dialling code: 01608
- Police: Thames Valley
- Fire: Oxfordshire
- Ambulance: South Central
- UK Parliament: Banbury
- Website: Kingham Parish Council

Kingham is a village and civil parish in the Cotswolds about 4 miles (6.4 km) southwest of Chipping Norton, Oxfordshire. The 2011 Census recorded the parish's population as 913.

== Toponym ==
The Domesday Book of 1086 records the toponym as Caningeham. Another 11th-century document records it as Keingeham. A charter from 1160 records it as Kaingham, as do numerous subsequent documents until 1251. A charter from 1160 and a pipe roll entry for 1163 record it as Caingeham. A charter of Osney Abbey from 1210 records it as Kangham. The Book of Fees records it as Kaingeham in entries for 1220 and 1242 and Keingham or Keyngham in entries for 1235–36. A feet of fines entry for 1254 records it as Kengham: a spelling that was frequent until 1377, when it was used in a Close Roll entry. An assize roll from 1268 records it as Kehingham. A charter of Eynsham Abbey from 1285 records it as Canyngesham, but an assize roll from the same year records it as Kyngham. The latter spelling remained in frequent use until 1428, when it was used in a feudal aid document. An earlier feudal aid document, from 1346, records it as Keygham. The name is derived from Old English, meaning "the hām (homestead) of Cǣga's people".

== Parish church ==
The Church of England parish church of St Andrew has a 14th-century Perpendicular Gothic west tower with a 15th-century top. The chancel was rebuilt in 1688. In 1852–53 the church was heavily restored and the south aisle was added. The tower has a ring of eight bells, all cast in 1924 by John Taylor & Co of Loughborough. The church is a Grade II* listed building. Both The Rectory and the Old Rectory Cottage are 17th century.

== Economic and social history ==
Building of the Oxford, Worcester and Wolverhampton Railway (OW&W) along the Evenlode Valley began in 1845 and was completed in 1853. It passes through the western part of Kingham parish but originally there was no station. In 1855 the Chipping Norton Railway was opened linking Chipping Norton with the OW&W 1 mile (1.6 km) south of Kingham village where a new station, Chipping Norton Junction, was opened. In 1862 the Bourton on the Water Railway opened between Chipping Norton Junction and Bourton-on-the-Water. The Great Western Railway took over the OW&W in 1862 and the Chipping Norton and Bourton lines in 1897. In 1909 the GWR renamed the junction station "Kingham". In 1962 British Railways closed the branch lines to Chipping Norton and Bourton-on-the-Water. BR later replaced the historic Kingham railway station building with a modern one. In 1955 the Royal Navy named a Ham-class minesweeper HMS Kingham after the village.

== Amenities ==
Kingham railway station is served by Cotswold Line trains between London Paddington, Oxford, Worcester and Hereford. Bus route X8 served the railway station and village from 2014. Buses ran peak hours only, Monday to Friday, to and from Chipping Norton via Churchill. Pulham's Coaches operated the route for Oxfordshire County Council until its withdrawal on 1 April 2022. The village has two gastropubs: The Plough, beside the older village green and The Wild Rabbit (formerly The Tollgate). The village also has an hotel called The Mill House. The village has a county primary school. The private Kingham Hill School is 1 1/2 miles (2.4 km) north of the village. Kingham has a village shop and post office, a Royal British Legion club, a village hall, two village greens, a children's play park and a football field.

== Twinning ==
Kingham is twinned with the village of Pont-à-Marcq near Lille in France.

== In popular culture ==
In 2004 a Country Life panel judged Kingham to be "England's Favourite Village". Blur bass-player Alex James lives on a sheep and dairy farm outside the village and chronicles the experience in his column in The Independent. An episode of the BBC Three comedy This Country was filmed at Kingham railway station.

== Sources ==
- Ekwall, Eilert (1960) [1936]. Concise Oxford Dictionary of English Place-Names (4th ed.). Oxford: Oxford University Press. Kingham. ISBN 0198691033.
- Gelling, Margaret (1954). Smith, AH (ed.). The Place-Names of Oxfordshire, Part II. Vol. XXIV. based on material collected by Doris Mary Stenton. Cambridge: Cambridge University Press for the English Place-Name Society. Kingham.
- Sherwood, Jennifer; Pevsner, Nikolaus (1974). Oxfordshire. The Buildings of England. Harmondsworth: Penguin Books. pp. 673–675. ISBN 0-14-071045-0.
