= Chipping Norton railway station =

Former railway station in Oxfordshire, England

Coordinates: 51.94066°N 1.55569°W

Chipping Norton
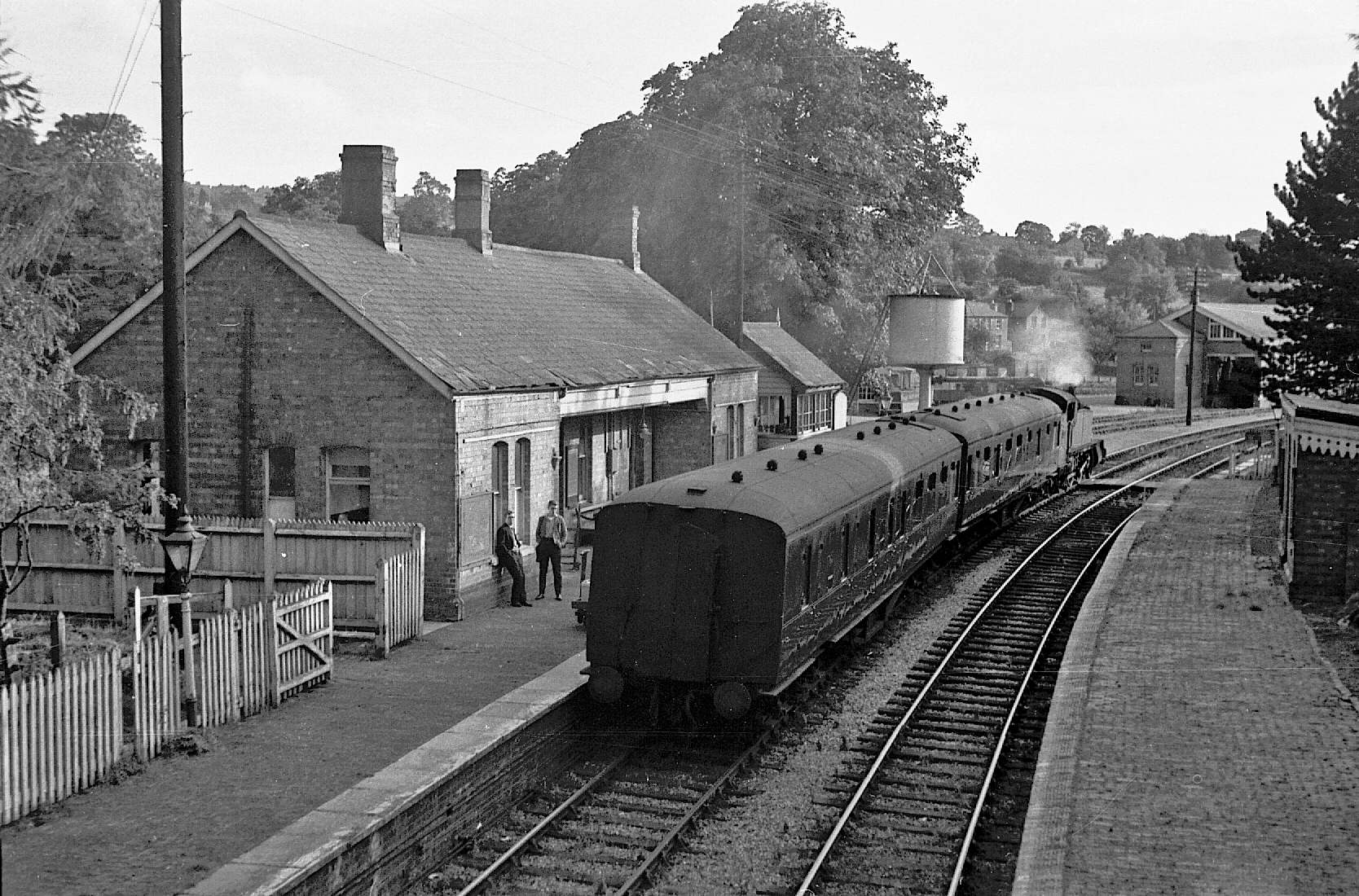
- The station in June 1962

General information
- Location: Chipping Norton, West Oxfordshire; England
- Grid reference: SP307270
- Platforms: 2

Other information
- Status: Disused

History
- Original company: Chipping Norton Railway
- Pre-grouping: Great Western Railway
- Post-grouping: Great Western Railway; Western Region of British Railways

Key dates
- 10 August 1855: Original station opened
- 6 April 1887: Station resited
- 3 December 1962: Station closed
- 1964: Closed completely
Location

Chipping Norton railway station served the town of Chipping Norton, Oxfordshire, England. The station had two platforms and a signal box. It was closed in 1964 and site now forms part of an industrial estate.

== History ==
The station was opened in 1855 as the terminus of the Chipping Norton Railway, which linked the town to the Oxford, Worcester and Wolverhampton Railway by a junction at Kingham. The line was promoted by William Bliss and its traffic included freight to and from his tweed mill at Chipping Norton.

Goods trains started running to the station in June 1855 and the official opening to passengers took place on 10 August 1855. Initially, there were three trains each way but, by January 1856, this had increased to six each way; the first and last of which continued along the main line to Shipton.

The station comprised a single platform and two-storey building. No photographs exist, but Bliss Tweed publicity material includes drawings of the station. A single-road engine shed, water tank and goods shed were also provided. Following complaints by passengers of the exposed state of the station, a wooden overall roof was added. In 1872, a siding was added to serve the gasworks adjacent to the tweed mill.

In 1860, the OW&WR amalgamated with two other railway companies to form the West Midland Railway. In 1863, the WMR amalgamated with the Great Western Railway (GWR) and Chipping Norton became part of the Great Western system.

In 1875, work began at Chipping Norton on the building of the Banbury and Cheltenham Direct Railway between Chipping Norton and Kings Sutton. A bridge was built to take the new line under the Worcester Road, although it would be twelve years before the first train passed under it. Work also started on the Chipping Norton Tunnel; however, the B&CDR experienced financial difficulties and the building work ceased in 1877 with the tunnel uncompleted. Construction resumed six years later in 1883, with the line to Banbury finally opening on 6 April 1887. The GWR operated the services over the new line. In 1897, the B&CDR was purchased by the GWR.

The old station was no longer required and it was demolished; the area it had occupied became the new goods yard. The engine shed remained for many years; it was closed in 1922 and was demolished by 1947. The small weighbridge building survived until the closure of the line, the only original building to do so.

The new station was sited on a curve. The main station building was on the down side, with a small shelter on the up side, and a lattice girder footbridge linked the two platforms. There were two signal boxes: Chipping Norton East on the station platform and Chipping Norton West near to the Bliss Tweed Mill. The West box was abolished in August 1929 and the East Box was renamed Chipping Norton Signal Box.

In 1904, a six-stall stable was built for the railway's horses. It was no longer required for this purpose after 1921, as delivery work had been contracted out. In 1929, a large door was added in the end wall and the building was used to house GWR motor buses. In 1948, it continued in use as a garage but for the Zonal Delivery Scheme lorries. The stable is the only railway building at Chipping Norton to survive to the present day.

There was a dramatic fall in passenger traffic during the 1920s; 30,455 tickets were sold in 1923 but, by 1929, this had fallen to 9,951. Parcels and goods traffic increased slightly over the same period. Jenkins, Brown and Parkhouse attribute the fall in passenger traffic to the transfer of railway road transport services to the local bus company.

In 1948, Chipping Norton became a railhead for the Zonal Delivery Scheme. The goods shed was modified with a series of loading bays constructed enabling goods to be unloaded from wagons straight into lorries for local delivery.

When Britain's railways were nationalised in 1948, the Banbury and Cheltenham line became part of the Western Region of British Railways. British Railways (BR) withdrew passenger services from the Chipping Norton - Kings Sutton section in 1951. In April 1958, a landslide blocked the line between Hook Norton and Rollright Halt. The landslide was never cleared and, after this time, the only trains running north from Chipping Norton were occasional goods services to Rollright Siding. The Kingham to Chipping Norton line was listed in The Reshaping of British Railways report, although with an asterisk to indicate that closure had already been decided before compilation of the report. The final passenger train ran on 1 December 1962. BR withdrew freight traffic from the line in 1964 and it was dismantled in 1965.

=== Accidents ===
In 1907, a small tank engine (no. 546) and a Toad brake van crashed into the West Signal Box. The brake van was severely damaged and the engine became derailed. The rails were taken up by the force of the locomotive.

=== World War Two ===
World War Two saw many children from London evacuated to small towns and villages in the countryside. Chipping Norton was one such place; trains brought children to the area from Acton and Ealing Broadway. These trains were some of the longest to have ever used the platforms at the station.

== The site today ==
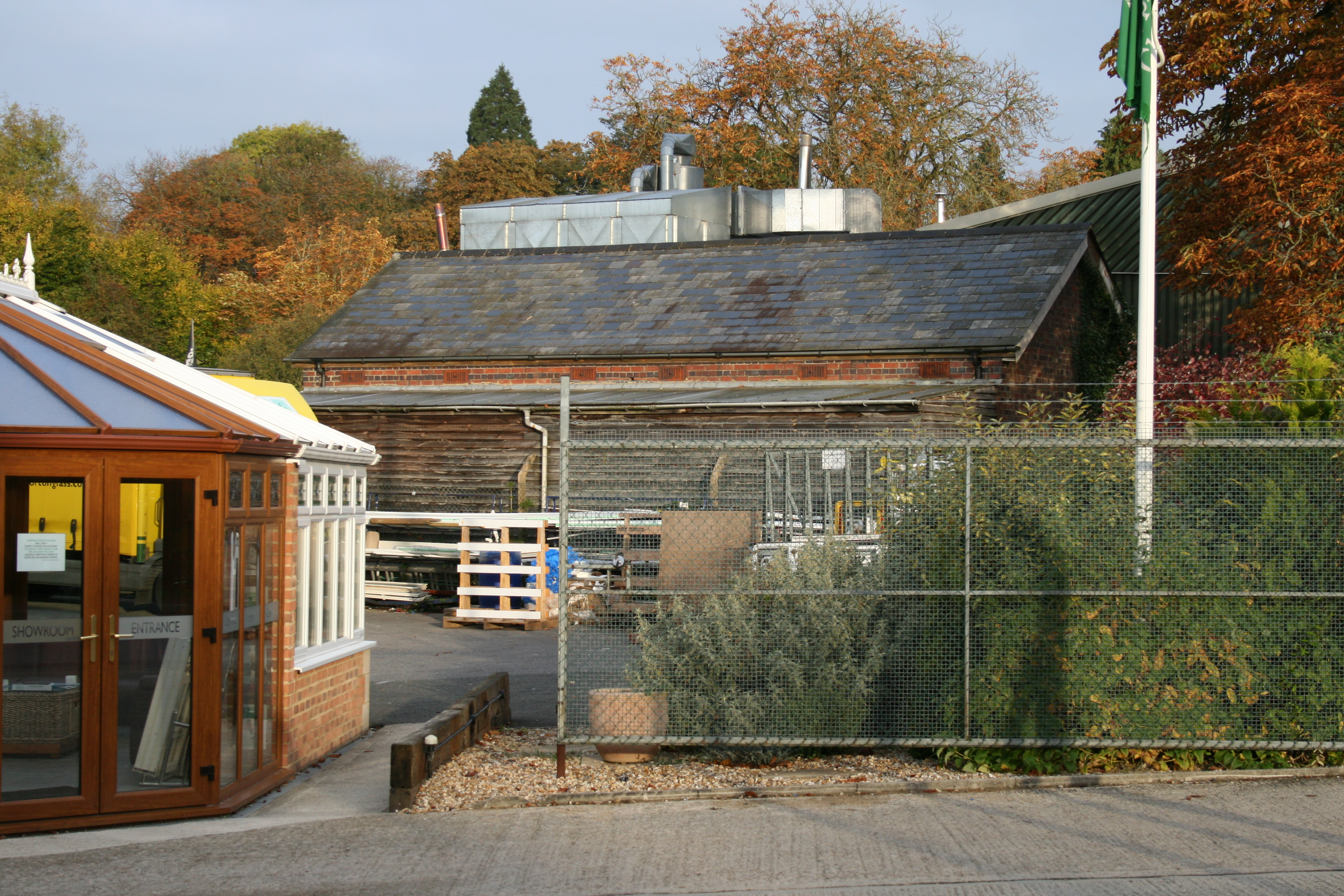
Former station stable building, now surrounded by subsequent industrial development

The site that was once occupied by the station and goods yard is now part of an industrial estate; only the stable remains. The tunnel through the hill and bridge for the road still exist, but the tunnel has been closed and has become flooded due to the filling-in of the bridge.

== Gallery ==
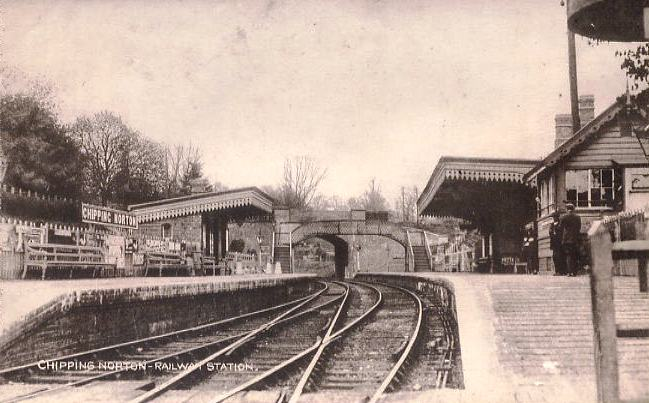
Station in GWR days

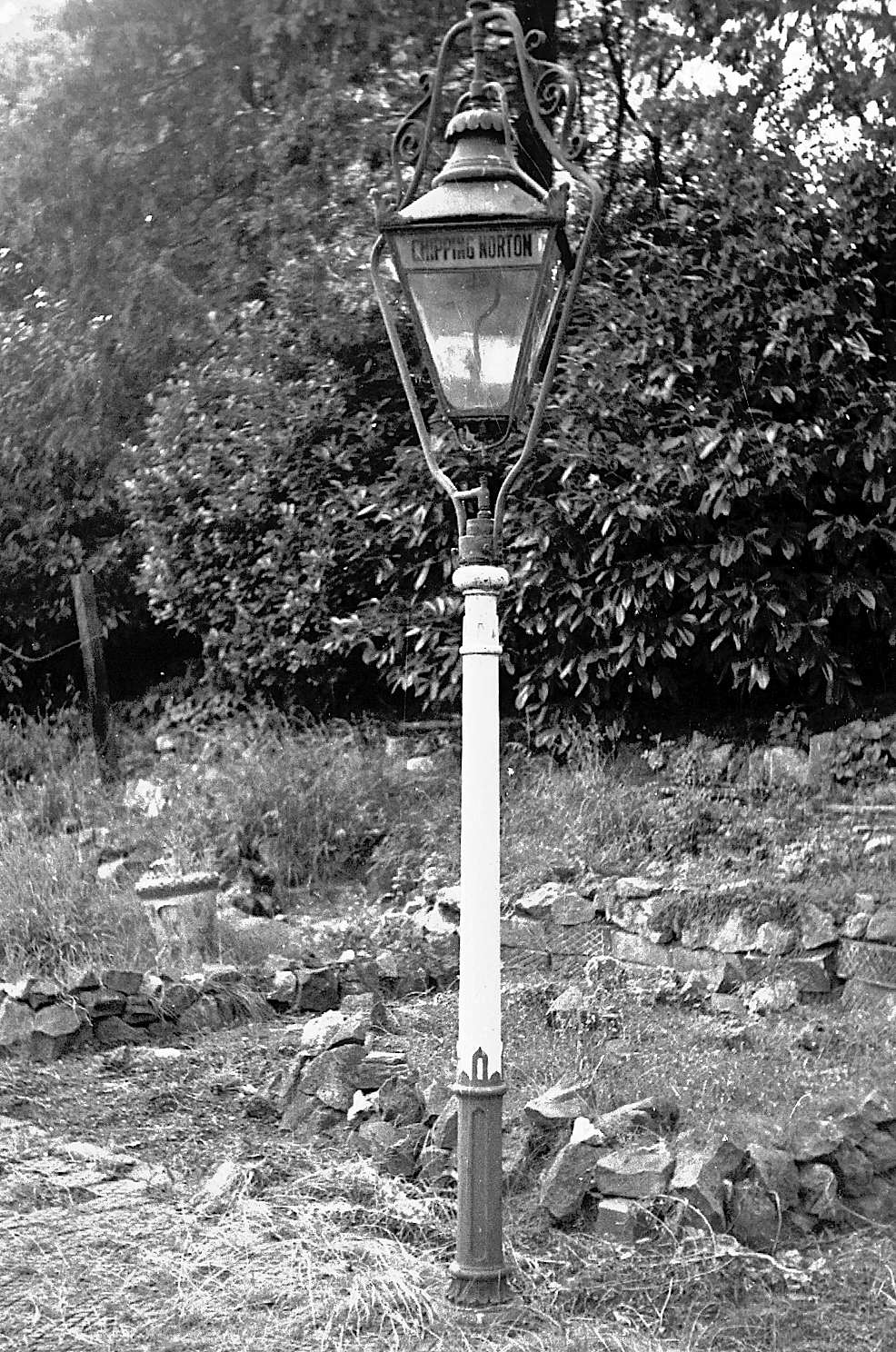
June 1962

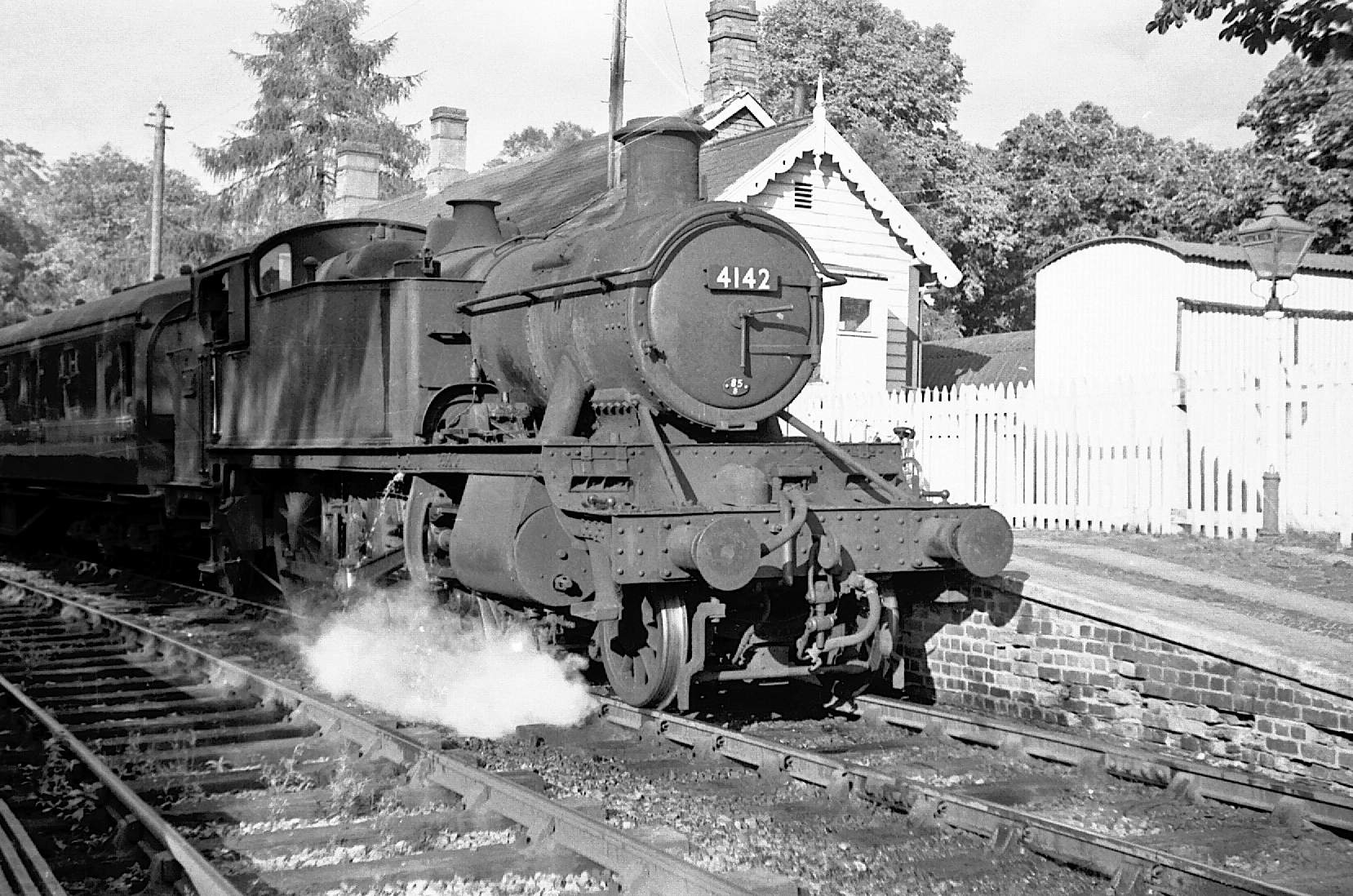
June 1962

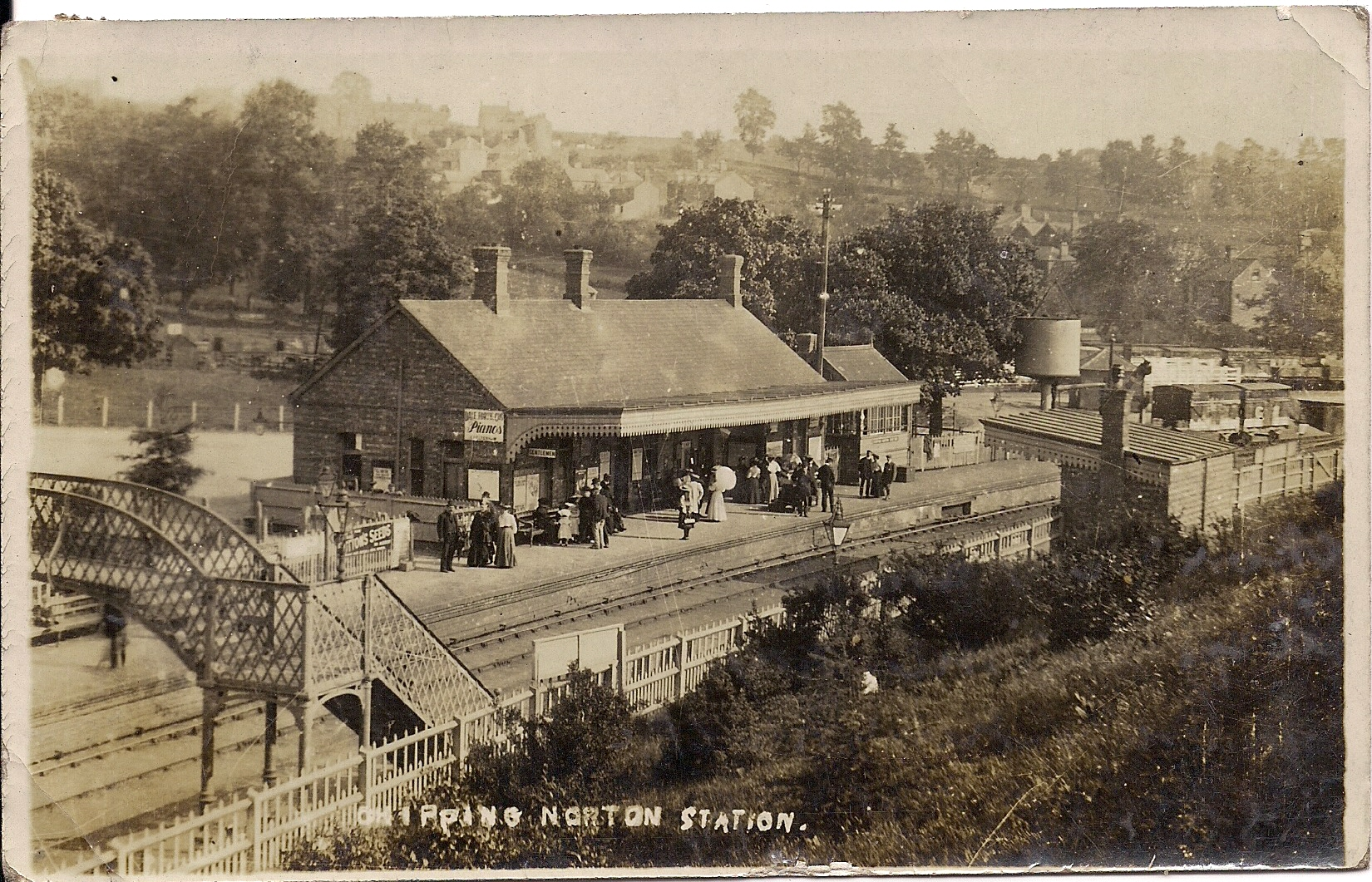
The station on a postcard

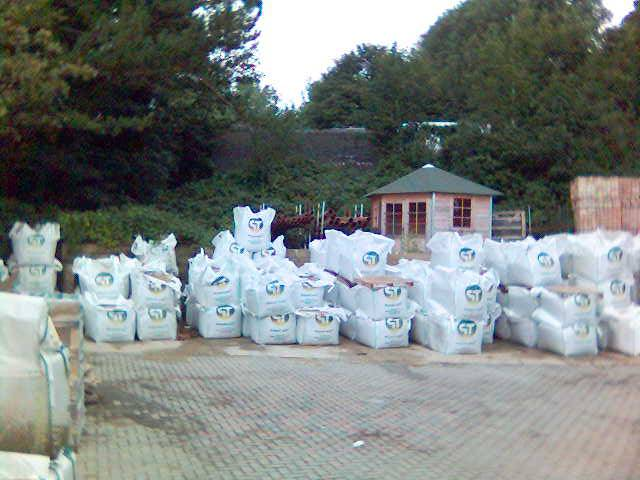
Site of Chipping Norton railway station

== Route ==
Preceding station	Disused railways	Following station
Sarsden Halt; Line and station closed	Great Western Railway; Banbury and Cheltenham Direct Railway	Rollright Halt; Line and station closed
