= David Lytton (writer) =

David Lytton (6 January 1927 – 9 August 2001) was a British-South African novelist and playwright.

== Biography ==
David Lytton was born in Cape Town, South Africa, and acted in several South African theatrical productions before emigrating to the United Kingdom in 1948, due to the fall of the government of Jan Smuts. He settled in Stratford-Upon-Avon, where he acted in local productions, managed the box office at the Shakespeare Memorial Theatre, and began writing plays before being recruited to write for the BBC in 1954 by Dennis Morris, Head of Programmes at BBC Midlands in Birmingham. Lytton left the BBC after three years to pursue writing independently.

Lytton wrote several novels, largely around the theme of South African social life, which were banned by the Apartheid government of South Africa for being critical of government racial policy. Lytton was a contributor on South African affairs to the BBC; he co-wrote and narrated The South African Dilemma, a 2-part BBC Radio documentary produced in 1960 for the 50th anniversary of the Union of South Africa. He also wrote and co-directed The Abbey of the English, a BBC documentary for the 900th anniversary of Westminster Abbey.

Lytton died at Chipping Norton, Oxfordshire, on 9 August 2001.

== Bibliography ==
=== Novels ===
The Goddam White Man (1960)
A Place Apart (1961)
The Paradise People (1962)
The Grass Won't Grow Till Spring (1965)
The Freedom of the Cage (1966)
A Tale of Love, Alas: and Other Episodes (1969)

=== Drama ===
The Cruel Necessity (BBC TV play) (1962)
Episodes of an Easter Rising (radio play) (1972)
