= Sarsden Halt railway station =

Former railway station in Oxfordshire, England

Coordinates: 51.9210°N 1.5995°W

Sarsden Halt

General information
- Location: Churchill, West Oxfordshire; England
- Grid reference: SP276248
- Platforms: 1

Other information
- Status: Disused

History
- Original company: Great Western Railway
- Pre-grouping: Great Western Railway
- Post-grouping: Great Western Railway; Western Region of British Railways

Key dates
- 2 July 1906: Opened
- 3 December 1962: Closed to passengers
Location

Sarsden Halt was an unstaffed railway station on the Banbury and Cheltenham Direct Railway.

== History ==
When the Chipping Norton Railway from Kingham on the Oxford, Worcester and Wolverhampton Railway to Chipping Norton opened in June 1855 a goods siding was provided at Churchill Mill. The inspector's report prior to the opening of the line refers to a siding at Churchill, on the 1899 Ordnance Survey map it is named as "Sarsden Siding".

The name is interesting since the location is more than a mile from the hamlet of Sarsden and much closer to the village of Churchill. The reason for the name is unknown, but the following factors may have had a bearing.

Firstly, James Haughton Langston MP of Sarsden House was one of the promoters of the railway and owned much of the land on which it was built. Much of the traffic to the siding would be destined for his estate, which included the village of Churchill. In 1852 James Haughton Langston had earlier tried to obtain a railway siding on the OW&W Railway, as recorded in that company's Traffic Committee minutes for 20 November:

A letter was read from Mr. Varden relative to a siding near Sarsden. Resolved that Mr. Lewis and Mr. Busby with the Superintendent call upon Mr. Langston and ascertain the amount of traffic likely to be put upon the line to and from the point where the siding is required.

The proposed siding on the main line was not built.

Secondly the OW&WR already had a station at Churchill near Kidderminster (later Churchill & Blakedown, now Blakedown). The need to avoid wagons and passengers being routed to the wrong destination would suggest the use of a name other than the obvious geographic name Churchill.

The siding was a loop and about 480 feet long. The loop's points were unlocked by a key on the train staff.

A level crossing carried the road from Churchill to Churchill Mill. Initially this was not regarded as a public crossing as it served only the mill yard. Later hand-operated gates were provided.

In 1883 work began on the building of the Kingham Hill Homes (now Kingham Hill School), one mile to the North-West. Kingham Station was not equipped for the handling of goods traffic so supplies for the school, including coal and provisions, were consigned to Sarsden Siding. Horse-drawn vehicles from the school accessed the siding via the mill yard. Access was liable to be prevented, for example when the miller was operating a threshing machine in the yard. Because of these problems Churchill Mill was purchased by the school and road traffic between the school and Churchill now passed over the level crossing. The price paid by the school to purchase the mill was considerably in excess of the market value and can only be explained by the importance placed on gaining unrestricted road access to Sarsden Siding.

In 1893 a signal box was built but in March 1899 it was reduced to the status of a ground frame. The box continued to carry the nameboard "Sarsden Signal Box" until closure. It contained six levers controlling two distant signals, the gate locks and the points at the Kingham end of the siding.

The Great Western Railway, which had taken over the Chipping Norton Railway, opened the passenger halt on 2 July 1906. It was a standard Great Western design with one timber platform and "pagoda" shelter. The designation "Halt" means it was unstaffed and tickets were purchased on the train. A cart weighbridge was built in 1913 and a crossing-keeper's house in 1930.

On 1 December 1962 British Rail ran the last passenger train on the Chipping Norton Railway and closed Sarsden Halt. The final train was hauled by BR standard class 2 number 78001.

Preceding station	Disused railways	Following station
Kingham; Line closed, station open	Great Western Railway; Banbury and Cheltenham Direct Railway	Chipping Norton; Line and station closed
Stow-on-the-Wold; Line and station closed	Great Western Railway; Banbury and Cheltenham Direct Railway	Chipping Norton; Line and station closed

== Goods traffic ==
Sarsden Siding had a curious status. It was not a private siding yet neither was it public in the sense that small consignments of goods could be sent and received there. Traffic seems to have been handled in full wagonloads only. Despite this, the siding was well used handling mainly agricultural traffic including milk. Coal was also delivered. Exact traffic figures are not available as the totals were counted in with Chipping Norton.

== Passenger traffic ==
Again detailed figures are not available. Most trains on the line called at the Halt, which was used by passengers from the village of Churchill and from Kingham Hill School. One train that did not usually stop was the daily Ports to Ports Express between Newcastle and South Wales, but even this would call at the Halt to set down passengers from beyond Leicester if 24 hours' notice was given.

== Present-day remains ==
The crossing-keepers house is the only building now remaining. The small group of houses at Churchill Mill is nowadays known as "Sarsden Halt". The wooden timetable board has been preserved and can be seen at Winchcombe Railway Museum. One of the platform oil lamps, a signal lamp and a wheel off the sack truck have been privately preserved. The Sarsden Halt nameboard and signal box nameplate are not thought to have survived.
