= Lucy Sarah Atkins Wilson =

British author and editor (1801–1863)

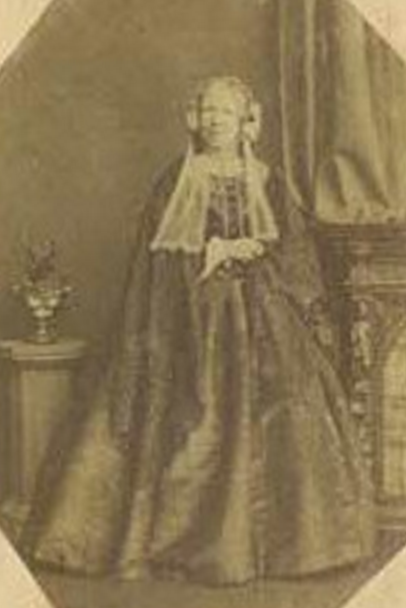
- Portrait of Lucy Sarah Atkins Wilson
- Born: Sarah Atkins; 27 December 1801; Chipping Norton, Oxfordshire, England
- Died: 25 January 1863 (aged 61); Greater London, London, England
- Occupations: Writer, Editor
- Spouse: Daniel Frederick Wilson
- Children: Daniel Frederick Wilson; Lucy Ann Wilson; Wilberforce Wilson; Emily Wilson; Fanny Wilson; Mary Louisa Wilson; Ellen Richenda Wilson; Edward Francis Wilson; Arthur Wilson
- Writing career
- Pen name: A Lady; Author of Botanical Rambles; Author of The India Cabinet Opened
- Subject: Children's Scientific Literature
- Notable works: The India Cabinet Opened; Fruits of Enterprise; Botanical Rambles; Relics of Antiquity; Memoirs of John Frederic Oberlin

Lucy Sarah Atkins Wilson (27 December 1801 – 25 January 1863) was a British writer and editor, specializing in scientific literature for children.

== Life ==
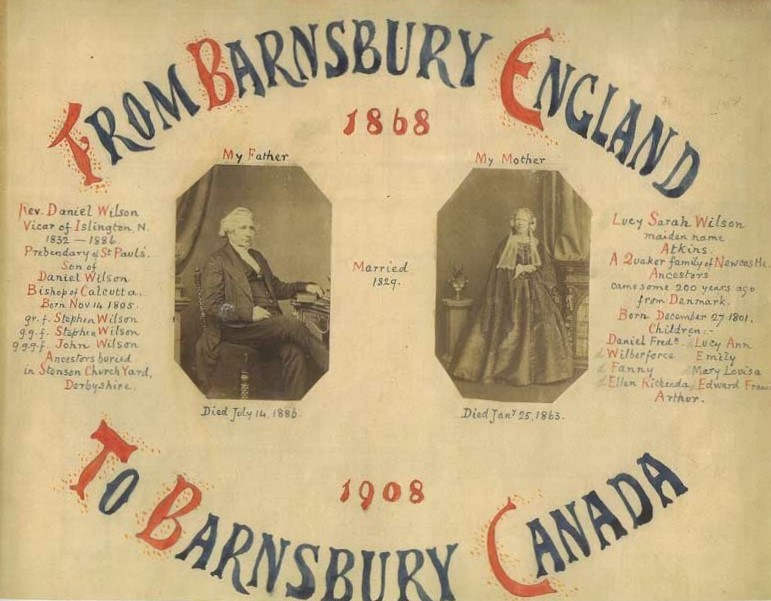
Sarah Atkins Wilson's immediate family, by her son, Edward Francis

Sarah Atkins was born to Samuel Atkins (d. 1821) and Ester Atkins (1776–1833) on 27 December 1801, in Chipping Norton, Oxfordshire, England. Born a Quaker, religion played a significant role throughout her life and had considerable influence in her writing. Her career as an author began in her early twenties, and focused on redacting and adapting literature regarding travel, history, and science for children. Her early works – The India Cabinet Opened (1821), Fruits of Enterprise (1821), and Botanical Rambles (1822), were successful, and remained in print for several editions.

Sarah Atkins married Daniel Frederick Wilson (1805–86), the Rector of Worton, Oxfordshire, on 14 December 1829. His father, Daniel Wilson, the prominent Vicar of Islington and the future Bishop of Calcutta, presided at the ceremony. Their son, also called Daniel Frederick Wilson (1830–1918), was born on 10 November 1830 and baptized on 12 December 1830 at Worton.

Atkins changed her first name to Lucy upon being baptized for her marriage to a clergyman. Her books, therefore, are attributed to various combinations of her names, including Sarah Atkins, Lucy Wilson, and Sarah Atkins Wilson. Additionally, as was common at the time, many of her books were published under pseudonyms, such as 'A Lady,' or as the author of a previous one of her works, such as 'The Author of Botanical Rambles.' Wilson mothered another eight children following their marriage, and wrote an anonymous publication detailing the efforts made as the wife of a clergyman, Hints to a Clergyman's Wife (1832). She lived in Islington, Greater London, until her death on 25 January 1863, at the age of 61. Her brief obituary in The Newcastle Courant remembers her contributions to literature, concluding that: "Her life was much devoted to works of piety and benevolence, and her loss will be deeply felt".

== Literary influence ==
Wilson was part of a small, British literary movement, led by women, to create instructional and amusing books regarding science, geography, and history, for children. Large type font and simple language gear the works towards younger readers, while her titles often explicitly address her audience. Wilson commonly uses a dialog format, with a mother, as an omniscient being, speaking to and answering the questions of her children. This places the maternal figure as an individual with informational authority, and aims to inspire curiosity within child readers.

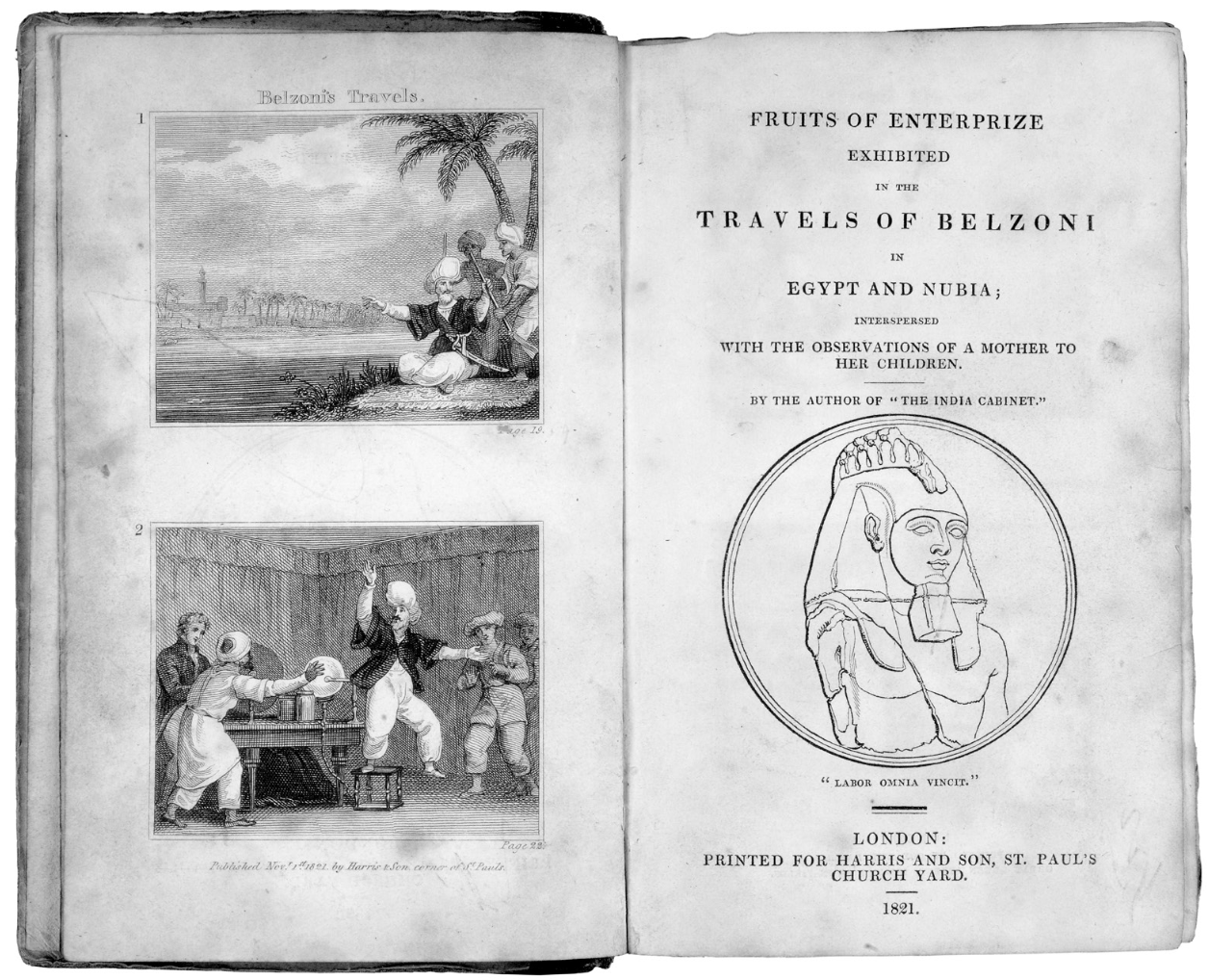
Title Page of Fruits of Enterprise

Wilson frequently drew inspiration from other female authors of the time, most notably, Priscilla Wakefield; Botanical Rambles (1822) draws heavily upon Wakefield's work, and even references Wakefield's Introduction to Botany as an authority on the subject. Like many other 19th century female writers, including Wakefield, Wilson was both driven and empowered by religion. Her Quaker upbringing and her eventual baptism into the Church of England, both brought her greater access to publishing and distributing. Quaker women had greater opportunity to exercise their voice, and Wilson capitalized on this, publishing at least ten works before converting to Anglicanism. At this point, her reputation was established, and her work grew more religious in content, to include titles such as Mamma's Bible Stories for Her Little Boys and Girls (1834), which told religious stories in simplified language.

Throughout her literary career, Wilson focused chiefly on using a union of information and amusement to intrigue young minds on scientific topics. Many of her works were categorized as 'children's primers' such as The Juvenile Rambler and included puzzles or 'dissected maps' in later editions: these games were viewed as educational supplements and aimed to connect learning and amusement. This theme was common to the educational approach of the time period in Britain, and is confirmed by the relative popularity of Wilson's works: nearly all of Wilson's works published multiple editions and remained in print well into the Victorian period. Some were even translated into other languages; Fruits of Enterprise (1821) was translated into French two years after being published in English.

== Publications ==
Original Works

- The India Cabinet Opened: In Which Many Natural Curiosities are Rendered a Source of Amusement to Young Minds (London: J. Harris and Son, 1821)
- Fruits of Enterprise Exhibited in the Travels of Belzoni in Egypt and Nubia (London: J. Harris and Son, 1821)
- Botanical Rambles: designed as an early and familiar introduction to the elegant and pleasing study of botany (London: Baldwin, Cradock, and Joy, 1822)
- A Visit to Grove Cottage for the Entertainment and Instruction of Children (London: J. Harris and Son, 1823)
- The Coral Necklace: Intended for the amusement of Children (London: J. & C. Evans, 1825)
- Relics of Antiquity: Exhibited in the Ruins of Pompeii and Herculaneum (London: John Harris, 1825)
- The Juvenile Rambler: in a series of easy reading lessons designed for children (London: John Harris, 1827)
- The Little Reader: a Progressive Step to Knowledge (London: John Harris, 1827)
- Real Stories: Taken from the narratives of Various Travelers (London: Harvey & Darton, 1827)
- Early Recollections (1828)
- Amusing Anecdotes of Various Animals: Intended for Children (London: J.E. Evans, 1829)
- The Pearl Bracelet: Intended for the Amusement of Children (London: J. E. Evans, 1829)
- Hints to a Clergyman's Wife (London: Holdsworth and Ball, 1832)
- Mamma's Bible Stories for Her Little Boys and Girls (London: John Harris, 1834)
- Fanny and Her Mamma, or, Easy Reading Lessons (London: Grant and Griffith, 1848)
- Sequel to Mamma's Bible Stories: chiefly in words not exceeding two syllables (New York: Robert Carter & Brothers, 1854)
- Scripture Histories for Little Children (New York: Evans and Dickerson, 1854)

Translations:

- Memoirs of John Frederic Oberlin, Pastor of Waldach (London: Holdsworth & Ball, 1829)
- O Lord, thy heavenly grace impart, And fix my frail inconstant heart (Hymnal by John Frederick Oberlin, 1829)
