= Stow-on-the-Wold railway station =

Former railway station in Gloucestershire, England

Coordinates: 51.9139°N 1.7251°W

Stow-on-the-Wold

General information
- Location: Stow-on-the-Wold, Cotswold; England
- Platforms: 2

Other information
- Status: Disused

History
- Original company: Bourton-on-the-Water Railway
- Pre-grouping: Great Western Railway
- Post-grouping: Great Western Railway; Western Region of British Railways

Key dates
- 1 June 1881: Station opened
- 15 October 1962: Station closed
Location

Stow-on-the-Wold railway station was a station on the Great Western Railway's Banbury and Cheltenham Direct Railway that opened in 1881. Situated about 1 1/2 miles (2.4 km) to the south the station served the Gloucestershire town of Stow-on-the-Wold and its surrounding villages. The station passed on to the Western Region of British Railways on nationalisation in 1948. It was then closed by the British Transport Commission.

== Stationmasters ==
- George Tibbs until 1900
- James Dowler 1900 - 1923 (formerly station master at Notgrove)
- G.J. Fifield 1923 - 1932 (formerly station master at Broadway)
- E.G. Unitt from 1932 (formerly station master at Awre)

Preceding station	Disused railways	Following station
Bourton-on-the-Water; Line and station closed	Great Western Railway; Banbury and Cheltenham Direct Railway	Kingham; Line closed, station open
Bourton-on-the-Water; Line and station closed	Great Western Railway; Banbury and Cheltenham Direct Railway	Sarsden Halt; Line and station closed
