= Banbury and Cheltenham Direct Railway =

Railway company in England

The Banbury and Cheltenham Direct Railway (B&CDR) was a railway company through the Cotswolds in England that built a line between points near Banbury and Cheltenham. Its principal objective, as well as a general rural rail service, was the conveyance of iron ore from the East Midlands to South Wales.

It extended two pre-existing branches, the Chipping Norton branch of the Oxford, Worcester and Wolverhampton Railway (OW&WR, opened in 1855) and the Bourton-on-the-Water Railway (opened in 1862). Both branches had their main line junction at Chipping Norton Junction, later renamed Kingham, on the OW&WR main line.

The B&CDR opened its western section, from Bourton-on-the-Water to a junction near Cheltenham, in 1881, and its eastern section, from Chipping Norton to a junction at Kings Sutton, near Banbury, in 1887. The company was always short of money, and the timescale of construction was correspondingly lengthy. When the extensions opened, the Great Western Railway worked the B&CDR line and the two earlier branches as a single railway throughout. Reversal of through trains was necessary at Chipping Norton Junction until a flyover line was opened, in 1906, and from that year a through express train from Barry to Newcastle Central ran over the route, using the flyover.

The company sold its undertaking to the GWR in 1896, receiving about a quarter of the capital it had expended on the construction. The line had difficult gradients and curvature, and much of the route was single track. Between 1951 and 1962 the passenger service was withdrawn in stages, and all of the line except a short stub at Kings Sutton was closed in 1964, followed by complete closure in 1969.

== The Oxford, Worcester and Wolverhampton main line ==
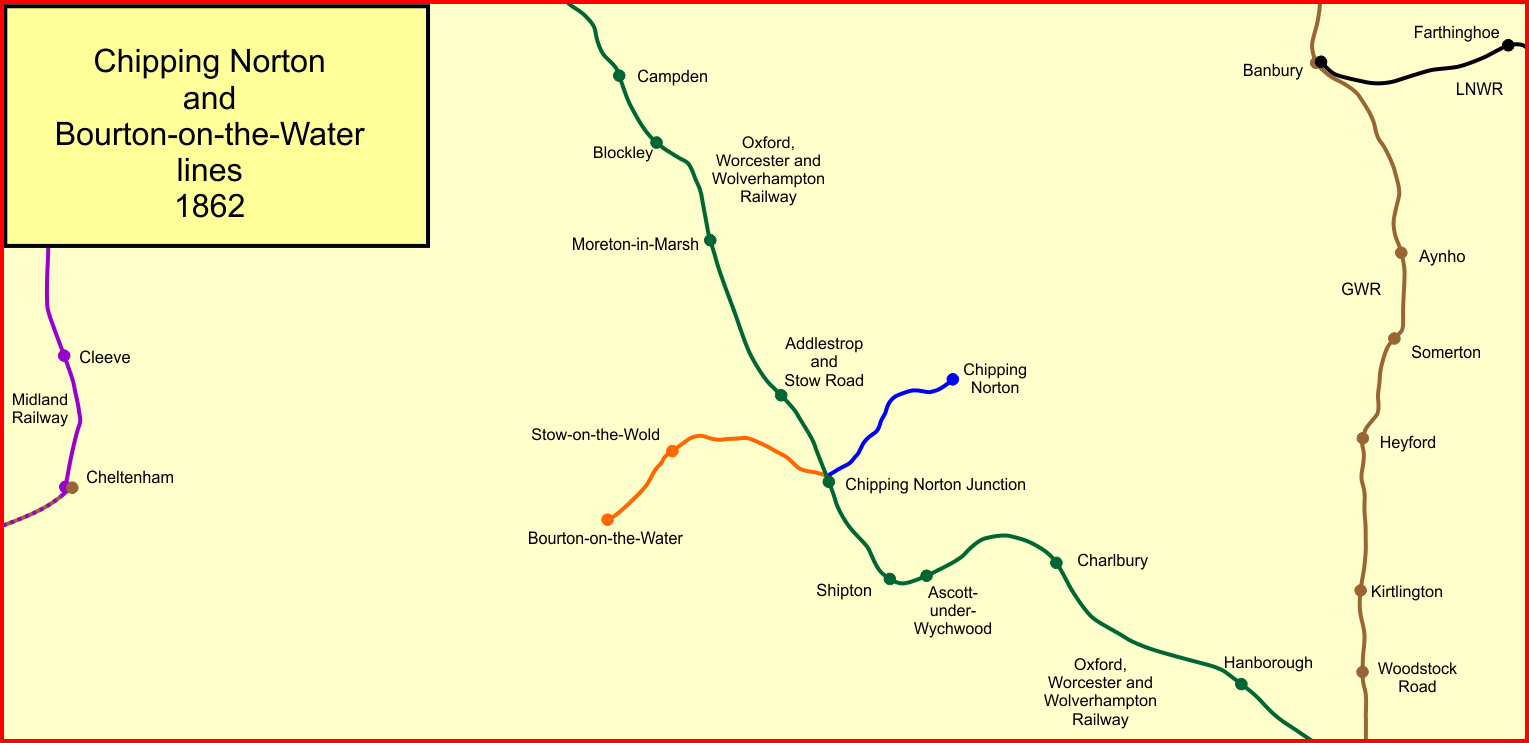
The Chipping Norton and Bourton-on-the-Water branches in 1862

Construction of the Oxford, Worcester and Wolverhampton Railway was authorised by the Oxford, Worcester and Wolverhampton Railway Act 1845 (8 & 9 Vict. c. clxxxiv) on 4 August 1845. It was designed to connect the industrial areas of the West Midlands with the growing railway network, and it was to be built on the broad gauge.

The Great Western Railway had friendly relations with it at first, and agreed to lease it on generous terms. That relationship deteriorated later, when the cost of construction overran considerably and there was a misunderstanding about the extent to which the GWR guarantee would cover the additional cost. While the broad gauge on the line tied the OW&WR to alliance with the GWR, it installed mixed gauge enabling the operation of standard gauge trains, and this was seen as an obvious indicator of treachery by the GWR.

By the time of the authorisation of the OW&WR, William Bliss had established an exceedingly successful business manufacturing tweed cloth in Chipping Norton, and he had extensive factory premises there. As well as facilities for transporting his products away to market, his business required considerable quantities of coal to power machinery used in his works. Transport by animal power was slow and expensive, especially as the road network in the Cotswolds was poor, and Bliss was anxious to take advantage of the railway. When the OW&WR line was designed, there were to be stations at Charlbury, Shipton-under-Wychwood and Adlestrop. All of these were six miles (10 km) or so distant from Chipping Norton, making them unsatisfactory for Bliss's needs, although the railway line was to pass much closer to the town.

== A Chipping Norton branch line ==
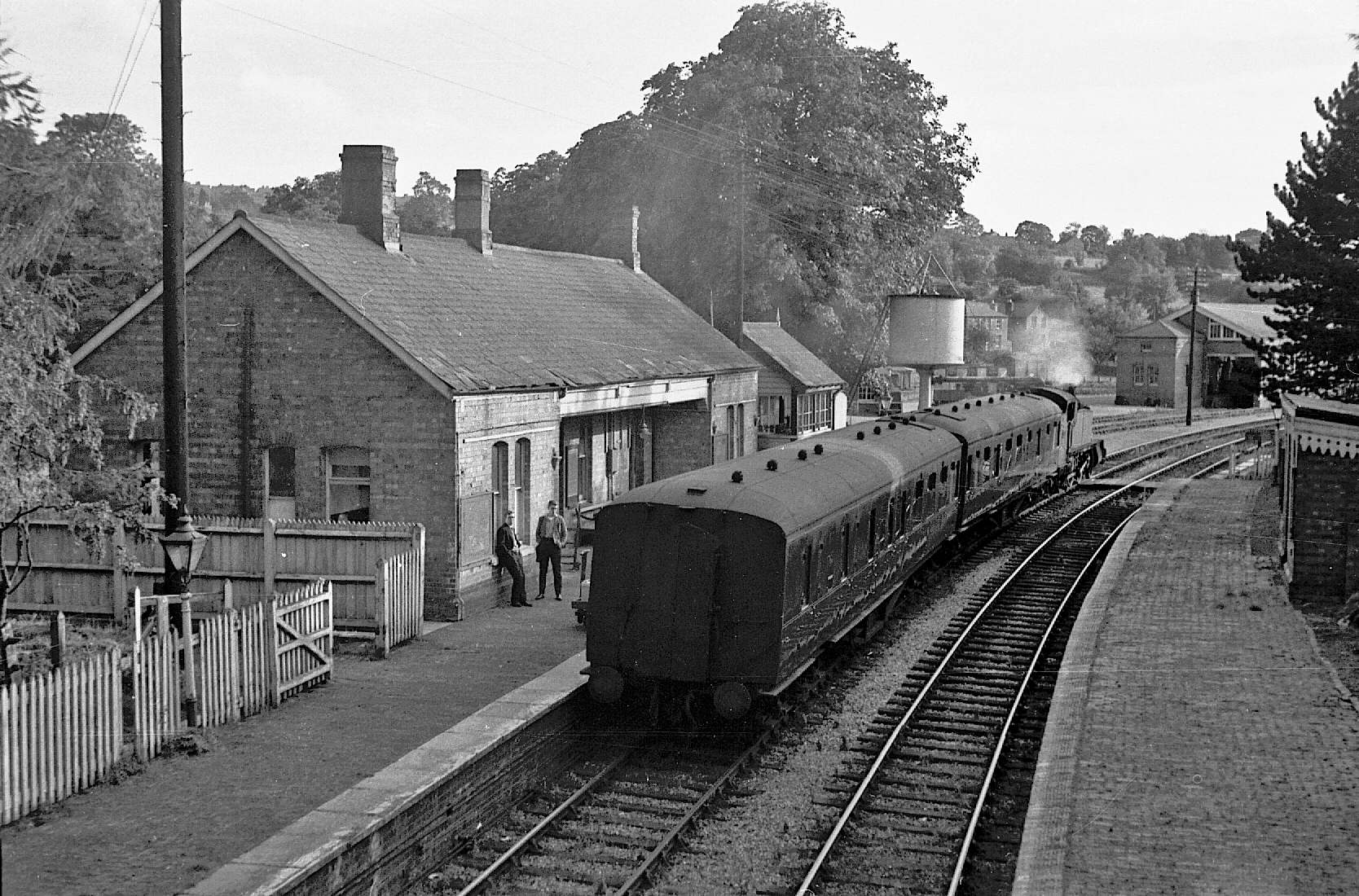
Chipping Norton station in 1962

William Bliss had already motivated people in Chipping Norton to clamour for a closer station, and now he started correspondence with the directors of the Oxford, Worcester and Wolverhampton Railway (OW&WR), proposing not merely a closer station, but a branch line into Chipping Norton itself. At this stage, the directors declined to promise the branch line.

The OW&WR line opened in 1853, and the local construction prior to the opening revived the desire of Bliss and his fellow citizens to ask for a branch line. By now the OW&WR was in serious financial difficulty, the cost of construction of their line having seriously overrun the estimate, and agreement to any new commitment was out of the question. In August 1853 Bliss and his friends, realising that persuading the OW&WR to build a branch was impossible, considered building the line themselves. John Fowler, the OW&WR engineer, gave advice and encouragement, and at the end of the year an estimated cost of £24,000 was arrived at, and local people were enthusiastic enough to subscribe the necessary capital. Sir Morton Peto took £14,000 and was the contractor for the construction.

The only difficulty in proceeding in Parliament was a last attempt by the Great Western Railway to insist on the broad gauge being adopted. This demand was lost and on 31 July 1854 the Oxford, Worcester and Wolverhampton Railway (Chipping Norton Branch) Act 1854 (17 & 18 Vict. c. ccix) was passed; it would be a narrow (standard) gauge line, sponsored by the OW&WR company.

Construction of the short line (four and a half miles, 7 km) did not take long, and it was opened to goods traffic on 1 June 1855. Colonel Yolland of the Board of Trade inspected the line for passenger operation on 26 July, and approved it. Accordingly, on 10 August 1855 the line opened for passenger traffic. (Note: Hemmings; Christiansen says 30 August 1855.) A new station on the main line, Chipping Norton Junction, was opened for the branch train connections. At first there were three passenger (probably mixed) trains each way daily, but by the following year this had been enhanced to six. The first and last trains of the day then ran through to Shipton to connect with main line trains that did not call at the junction station.

Hemmings says that "from the beginning it is almost certain that the line was worked by one of the two small 0-4-2ST locomotives built by E. B. Wilson & Co for the OW&WR in 1853/5."

Construction of the line had actually cost £23,232; at the end of 1859 the OW&WR purchased the line, guaranteeing 4% to shareholders on their capital.

== Amalgamation of the OW&WR ==
In 1860 discussions between the Oxford, Worcester and Wolverhampton Railway (OW&WR) and its allies regarding amalgamation came to fruition. The Worcester and Hereford Railway, which was in financial difficulty, would be purchased, and the OW&WR and the Newport, Abergavenny and Hereford Railway would amalgamate, the combined company being named the West Midland Railway. This was confirmed by an act of Parliament of June 1860, the West Midland Railway Act 1860 (23 & 24 Vict. c. lxxxi). The separate existence of the West Midland Railway (WMR) lasted three years; in 1863 the WMR amalgamated with the Great Western Railway.

== Bourton-on-the-Water ==
Bourton-on-the-Water Railway Act 1860
- Act of Parliament
- Parliament of the United Kingdom
- Long title: An Act for making a Railway from the Oxford, Worcester, and Wolverhampton Railway to Bourton-on-the-Water in the County of Gloucester, and for other Purposes.
- Citation: 23 & 24 Vict. c. lxxxii

Dates
- Royal assent: 14 June 1860

The comparative ease with which the Chipping Norton Railway scheme took shape appears to have encouraged thoughts of constructing a similar branch line to Bourton-on-the-Water, located just over six miles (10 km) westward from Chipping Norton Junction. The Oxford, Worcester and Wolverhampton Railway (OW&WR) was friendly to this proposal, and voted £3,500 towards the subscription list of the provisional Bourton-on-the-Water Railway Company. (Note: Subscription by the OW&WR of £3,000 only was authorised in the eventual Bourton-on-the-Water Railway Act 1860.) It was submitted to Parliament in the 1860 session and obtained its authorising act of Parliament, the Bourton-on-the-Water Railway Act 1860 (23 & 24 Vict. c. lxxxii), on 14 June 1860.

Capital of the new company was £30,000. Land acquisition proved to be exceptionally difficult, with many landowners holding out for unreasonable remuneration, but otherwise the construction, undertaken by Sir Morton Peto, was straightforward.

Captain J. H. Rich of the Board of Trade inspected the line for the necessary approval for passenger operation on 14 February 1862 and was satisfied. Extension to Cheltenham was evidently already under consideration, for Rich received an assurance that turntables would be erected at the projected terminus of the line, Cheltenham, or at Bourton-on-the-Water "in case it shall remain as the Terminal station of the branch". Passenger operation commenced on 1 March 1862, with goods traffic starting a few days later. There were four round trips daily, most trains operating as mixed.

== Proposed extension to Cheltenham ==
Bourton-on-the-Water Railway (Extension to Cheltenham) Act 1864 (Note: Section 1.)
- Act of Parliament
- Parliament of the United Kingdom
- Long title: An Act to extend the Bourton-on-the-Water Railway towards Cheltenham; to amend the Act relating to the Bourton-on-the-Water Railway Company; and for other Purposes.
- Citation: 27 & 28 Vict. c. ccx
- Territorial extent: United Kingdom

Dates
- Royal assent: 25 July 1864
- Commencement: 25 July 1864 (Note: The Acts of Parliament (Commencement) Act 1793.)

Other legislation
- Amends: Bourton-on-the-Water Railway Act 1860
- Amended by: Bourton on the Water Railway (Extension to Cheltenham) Abandonment Act 1867
- Repealed by: Statute Law (Repeals) Act 2013

Status: Repealed

Text of statute as originally enacted

The Bourton-on-the-Water Railway Company now submitted to Parliament proposals to extend their line to Cheltenham. On 25 July 1864 this scheme was authorised by an act of Parliament, the Bourton-on-the-Water Railway (Extension to Cheltenham) Act 1864 (27 & 28 Vict. c. ccx), although only as far as Andoversford, from where the East Gloucestershire Railway was to build into Cheltenham, the Bourton company receiving running powers over that line. The East Gloucestershire company started construction but the failure of the banking firm of Overend, Gurney and Company in 1866 brought the financing of all railway schemes to an end for a while as money became impossible to get. The authorising act for the Bourton company's extension included a £50 daily penalty for failure to complete the line, and inability to raise finance was specifically excluded as an excuse.

Bourton on the Water Railway (Extension to Cheltenham) Abandonment Act 1867
- Act of Parliament
- Parliament of the United Kingdom
- Long title: An Act for the Abandonment of the Railway authorized by "The Bourton on the Water Railway (Extension to Cheltenham) Act, 1864."
- Citation: 30 & 31 Vict. c. cxciii
- Territorial extent: United Kingdom

Dates
- Royal assent: 12 August 1867
- Commencement: 12 August 1867

Other legislation
- Amends: Bourton-on-the-Water Railway (Extension to Cheltenham) Act 1864
- Repealed by: Statute Law (Repeals) Act 2013

Status: Repealed

Text of statute as originally enacted

In haste therefore, and not without controversy, the Bourton company applied to Parliament for abandonment of the Cheltenham extension scheme, and the Bourton on the Water Railway (Extension to Cheltenham) Abandonment Act 1867 (30 & 31 Vict. c. cxciii) was obtained on 12 August 1867. The Bourton company therefore simply operated a small branch line from the OW&WR main line, by now part of the Great Western Railway. Transfer of the Bourton undertaking to the GWR seemed sensible, and a provisional agreement to that effect was reached in 1870, the Great Western Railway Act 1870 (33 & 34 Vict. c. cxl) being obtained to confirm it. Issues of liabilities due to the abandonment of the Cheltenham extension worried the GWR, and delayed the finalising of the transfer, and it was not until 1 February 1874 that the arrangement was formally effective.

== Banbury and Cheltenham Direct Railway proposed ==
In 1872 proposals were formalised for what became the Banbury and Cheltenham Direct Railway. It was to run from the GWR's Oxford line at Kings Sutton, and use the Chipping Norton branch and the Bourton-on-the-Water Railway as part of its route. The proposed capital was £800,000; this proved to be a significant underestimate. Considerable deposits of haematite iron ore were known to exist on the line of route at the eastern end. There was a demand at the South Wales ironworks for this material, as modern smelting methods required a mixture of raw materials and the Welsh iron ore needed to have an admixture.

Banbury and Cheltenham Direct Railway Act 1873
- Act of Parliament
- Parliament of the United Kingdom
- Long title: An Act to incorporate a Company for the construction or the Banbury and Cheltenham Direct Railway; and for other purposes.
- Citation: 36 & 37 Vict. c. clxxii
- Territorial extent: United Kingdom

Dates
- Royal assent: 21 July 1873
- Commencement: 21 July 1873

Status: Current legislation

Text of statute as originally enacted

The Banbury and Cheltenham Direct Railway Act 1873 (36 & 37 Vict. c. clxxii) received royal assent on 21 July 1873. There was to be a triangular junction at each end, Kings Sutton and at Hatherley, near Cheltenham. (Note: The East Gloucestershire scheme at Andoversford was long since abandoned.) At Chipping Norton Junction, later Kingham, there was to be a flyover across the main line for the benefit of through trains. An alternative proposal was considered, to make a loop entering from Chipping Norton in to the junction from the south, enabling through operation without the cost of a bridge, but this was not proceeded with.

Banbury and Cheltenham Direct Railway Act 1877
- Act of Parliament
- Parliament of the United Kingdom
- Long title: An Act to empower the Banbury and Cheltenham Direct Railway Company to make a Deviation of their authorised Railway, and to make a New Railway, and to execute other works and exercise other powers, and to raise further Money, and to extend the Time limited for the Construction of their authorised Railway; and for other purposes.
- Citation: 40 & 41 Vict. c. cix
- Territorial extent: United Kingdom

Dates
- Royal assent: 23 July 1877
- Commencement: 23 July 1877

Status: Current legislation

Text of statute as originally enacted

Banbury and Cheltenham Direct Railway Act 1878
- Act of Parliament
- Parliament of the United Kingdom
- Long title: An Act for conferring further powers upon the holders of certain Debenture Stock of the Banbury and Cheltenham Direct Railway Company; and for other purposes.
- Citation: 41 & 42 Vict. c. ccxxiii
- Territorial extent: United Kingdom

Dates
- Royal assent: 8 August 1878
- Commencement: 8 August 1878

Status: Current legislation

Text of statute as originally enacted

Acquisition of the necessary land proved to be exceptionally difficult, and the scale of the engineering works was greater than was originally thought: the cutting near Hook Norton was said to be one of the largest attempted in England. Extremely difficult weather conditions, failure of the contractor Alfred Terry to honour promises about the speed of completion of work, and a very considerable cost overrun beset the works. In 1876 it was apparent that completion of the line was not possible without additional finance, and an extension of the time allowable by the original act, and the company went to Parliament in 1877 seeking additional capital. A further £400,000 in debenture shares was authorised by the Banbury and Cheltenham Direct Railway Act 1877 (40 & 41 Vict. c. cix) of 23 July 1877, with further time to complete land acquisition as well as the actual construction.

The viaducts in the vicinity of Chipping Norton were not on the intended route which was to have passed further south. Indeed, construction of the cutting to the south had already started when the revised route was announced.

== Construction and opening ==
In fact, after initial enthusiasm, the debenture share issue only had a limited takeup until much later. The Great Western Railway (GWR) agreed to work the line when it opened, but presented a number of requirements for facilities which the company had not thought to provide and which they could ill afford. The company now decided to concentrate on opening between Bourton and Cheltenham.

On 28 March 1881 Colonel Rich of the Board of Trade visited the line to review its suitability for passenger operation. He noted that only at Andoversford was there an intermediate passing place on the long single line. As well as requesting a large number of detail improvements, he required additional excavation to the cutting slopes near the tunnel approaches, incurring considerable extra cost.

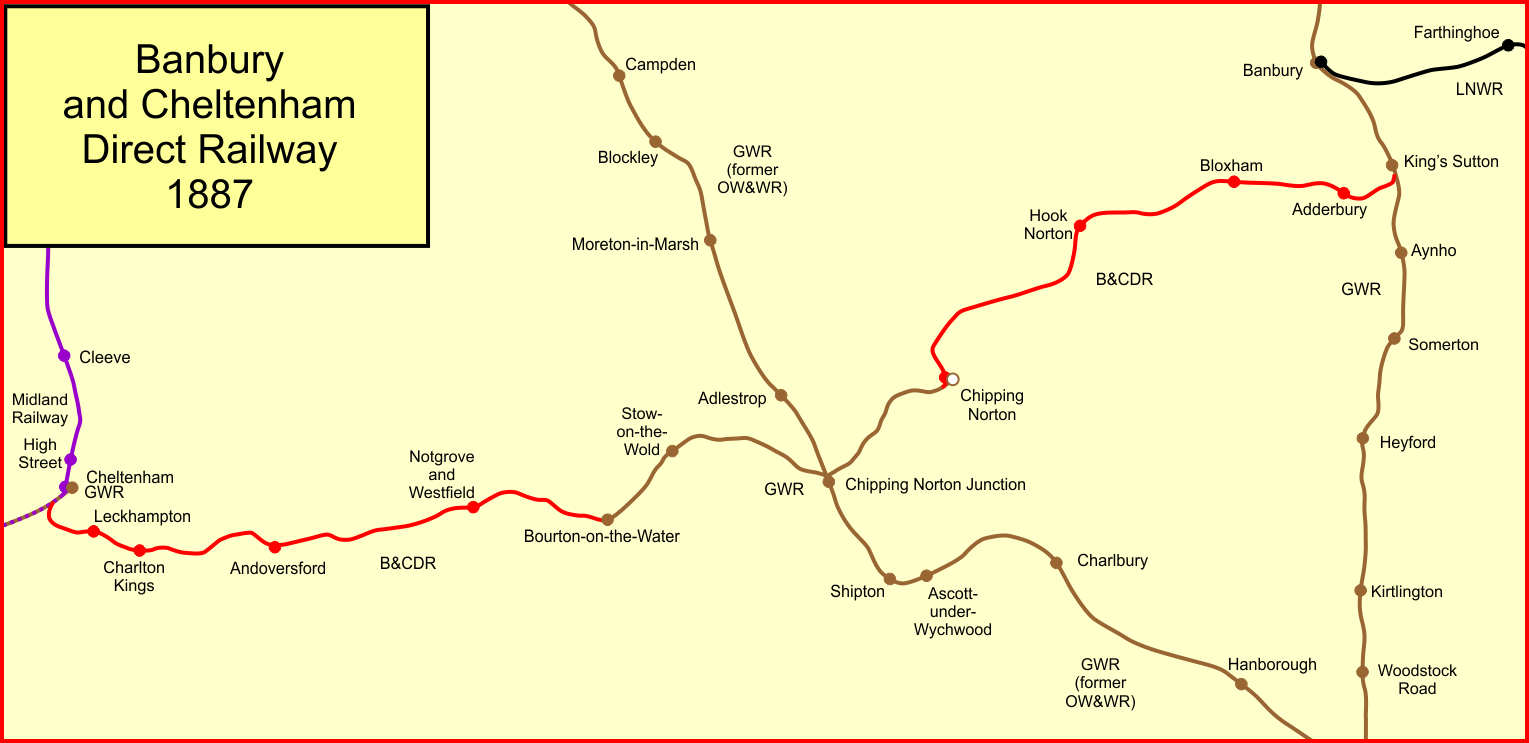
The Banbury and Cheltenham Direct Railway in 1887

After rectification works and a further inspection, the line from Bourton to Cheltenham was opened on 1 June 1881. For the time being the south curve at Hatherley was not constructed although the GWR laid in a "siding" for the passage of locomotives in 1883.

Attention now turned to completing the eastern section of the line, from Chipping Norton to Kings Sutton; much of this had not received any attention whatever for the preceding five years. Work on this section too suffered from bad weather, inadequate project management by the contractor, and above all a lack of finance by the company. The section between Kings Sutton and Bloxham was completed, and inspected and passed for passenger operation by the Board of Trade inspector; a change of plan quickly followed and this section was not opened until later. At the end of August 1886 Major General Hutchinson carried out an inspection of the Bloxham to Chipping Norton section; there was a new station at Chipping Norton as the alignment of the old one was unsuitable for through operation. Although there were some detail issues requiring attention, the line was passed.

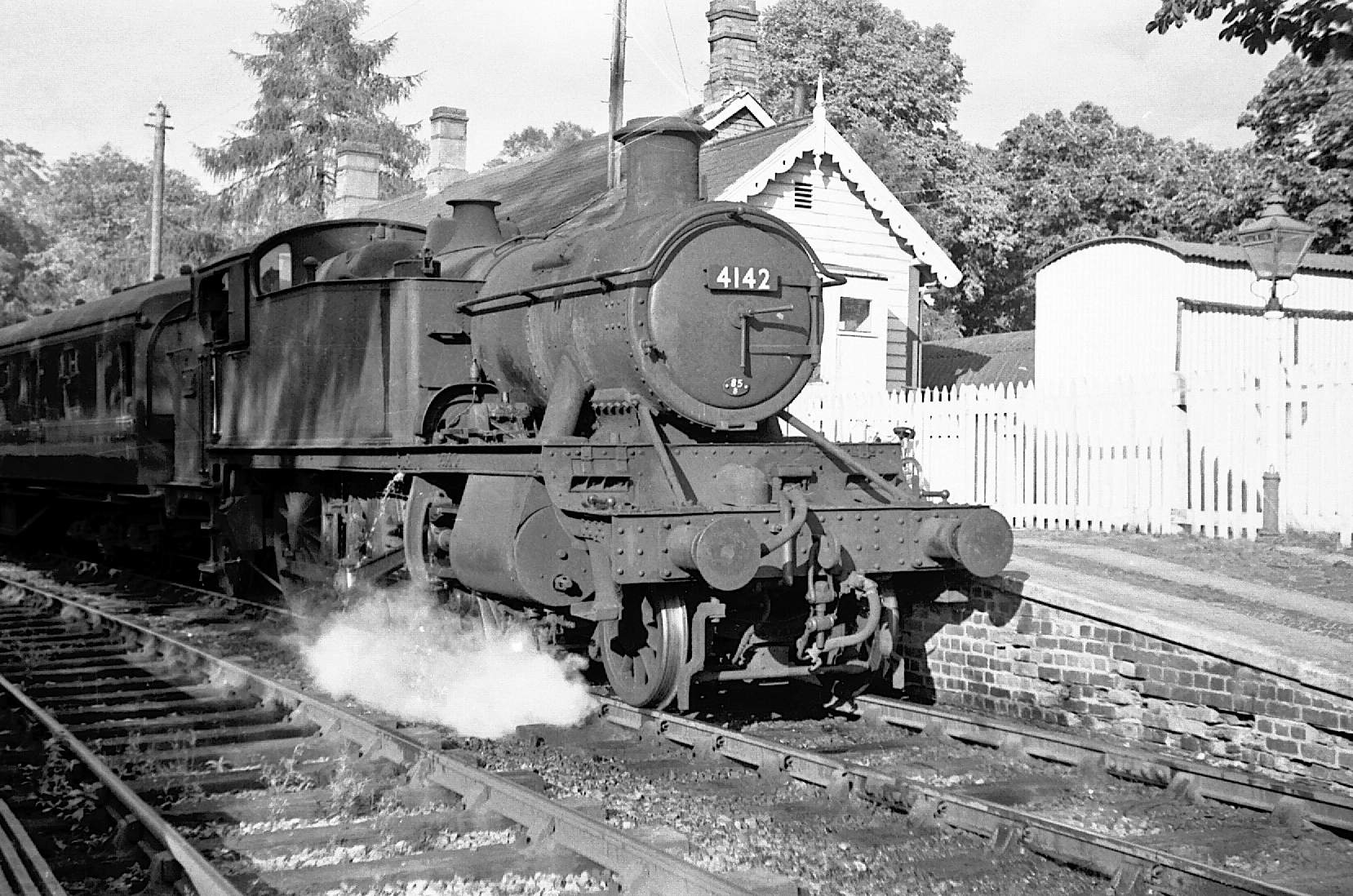
A train at Chipping Norton in 1962

Nevertheless, there was still a delay in opening the line, discussions with the GWR over the working arrangements apparently intervening. Eventually, on 6 April 1887 the eastern section of the line opened and the Banbury and Cheltenham Direct Railway was operational throughout. It was worked by the Great Western Railway. Nearly £1.8 million had been issued as share capital. The line ran between Kings Sutton and Chipping Norton, and between Bourton-on-the-Water and Lansdown Junction at Cheltenham. Chipping Norton to Kingham and on to Bourton were GWR routes by this time. There were five passenger trains and two goods trains daily each way. (Note: Hemmings reproduces a GWR Service timetable on page 96 that tells a different story. His caption dates it at July 1877 but the line was not fully open then, and from its placing in the book it seems that 1887 is intended. There were four daily passenger trains running throughout between Banbury and Cheltenham St James (GWR); these trains reversed at Chipping Norton Junction. In addition there were six short passenger workings between Chipping Norton Junction and Chipping Norton, and one goods round trip. A note states: "All Local Trains between Chipping Norton and Chipping Norton Junction convey Goods Wagons and call at Sarsden Siding if required. There was also a goods train between Banbury and Hook Norton each way, and another between Chipping Norton Junction and Cheltenham.)

== Midland and South Western Junction Railway ==
The Midland and South Western Junction Railway (M&SWJR) was building its line connecting Southampton with Cheltenham, and on 16 March 1891 it made a connection with the Banbury and Cheltenham line at Andoversford, reaching Cheltenham by running powers over the B&CDR and at Cheltenham itself using the Midland Railway station there.

About 1880 passing loops had been added at Leckhampton and Charlton Kings, between Andoversford and Cheltenham, but the additional traffic from the M&SWJR began to overload the single line's capacity. In 1901 double line was provided (by the Great Western Railway) over this section.

== Sale to the GWR ==
Starting in 1894 the B&CDR had put forward proposals for the Great Western Railway (GWR) to absorb the company. This was an obvious step, but the GWR was not to be rushed, but agreement was reached on 13 August 1896. The Great Western Railway (Additional Powers) Act 1897 (60 & 61 Vict. c. ccxlviii) was required, and this was obtained on 6 August 1897. The effective date was 1 July 1897. The GWR paid £450,000, being 25% of the issued capital of the B&CDR. Ordinary shareholders received £2 per cent. (Note: MacDermot says, on page 338 of volume II, that the western section from Bourton-on-the-Water to Cheltenham was purchased for £138,000 cash; he does not mention the eastern section.)

== Line improvements ==
Iron ore deposits had been found on the course of the eastern part of the line, and a number of siding connections had been made to accommodate the traffic; in addition flows from Northamptonshire to South Wales had been running for some time by the end of the nineteenth century. This potential was increased in 1900 when the Great Central Railway reached Banbury, with the possibility of running traffic from the north and east over the B&CD line.

This moved the GWR to revive the flyover proposal at Chipping Norton Junction to enable through operation without reversal, and to double parts of the eastern section of the route. In addition the south curve at Hatherley (the "Gloucester Loop"), and at Kings Sutton, which would enable direct running from Oxford and Yarnton towards Chipping Norton was revived, although this latter idea was never implemented.

The flyover at Chipping Norton Junction was opened for goods traffic on 8 January 1906, and from 1 May 1906 a through express train from Barry to Newcastle Central ran, using the new line. The train also used the Hatherley curve. The B&CDR company had originally suggested that their Leckhampton station should be known as Cheltenham South, an idea that was viewed with disfavour all round. (Note: Russell says that later the name was changed to Cheltenham South and Leckhampton, for the sole purpose of allowing the Welsh Express (the Barry to Newcastle train) to pick up and set down at a Cheltenham station.) Numerous improvements to existing crossing loops were implemented at the same time, as well as doubling the line at Adderbury. Three new halts were opened at this time as well: at Churchill, named Sarsden Halt, and at Great Rollright and Milton. On 1 May 1909 the now anomalous title of Chipping Norton Junction station was changed to Kingham.

== After 1918 ==
After the end of World War I there began a process of considerable social change. Motor omnibuses and lorries began to compete with rural railways, and as roads improved they offered ever better services compared to the railways. At the same time, traditional industries transformed, and international competition reduced the demand for iron ore from the more expensive mining locations served by the line.

Most of the railways of Great Britain were restructured in 1923 following the Railways Act 1921, and were nationalised in 1948. In the period following World War II the local passenger business declined more steeply than ever, and the iron ore traffic which had been the mainstay of the freight business also dropped away.

The Kings Sutton to Chipping Norton local passenger service was withdrawn in 1951, and in October 1962 the Kingham to Cheltenham service was also closed. This was followed by closure of the Kingham to Chipping Norton trains in December 1962, as well as the Kingham to Hook Norton freight service. Hook Norton to Adderbury closed in 1963. Kingham to Chipping Norton and Kingham to Bourton-on-the-Water closed completely in September 1964. Ironstone workings at Adderbury serviced from Kings Sutton enabled the easternmost stub to continue until 1969.

== Topography ==
- Kings Sutton Junction; divergence from Banbury to Oxford line;
- Adderbury; opened 6 April 1887; closed 4 June 1951;
- Milton Halt; opened 1 January 1908; closed 4 June 1951;
- Bloxham; opened 6 April 1887; closed 4 June 1951;
- Hook Norton; opened 6 April 1887; closed 4 June 1951;
- Hook Norton Tunnel; 418 yards;
- Rollright Halt; opened 12 December 1906; closed 4 June 1951;
- Chipping Norton Tunnel; 685 yards;
- Chipping Norton; opened 10 August 1855; relocated on through line 6 April 1887; closed 3 December 1962;
- Sarsden Siding; opened for informal use by July 1897; opened to public as Sarsden Halt 2 July 1906; closed 3 December 1962;
- Kingham East Junction;
- Chipping Norton Junction; OW&WR station; opened 10 August 1855; renamed Kingham 1909; still open; station on the OW&WR main line; through B&CDR trains reversed here; the Kingham Loop ran direct from Kingham East Junction to Kingham West Junction;
- Kingham West Junction
- Stow-on-the-Wold; opened 1 March 1862; closed 15 October 1962;
- Bourton-on-the-Water; opened 1 March 1862; closed 15 October 1962;
- Notgrove and Westfield; opened 1 June 1881; renamed Notgrove 1896; closed 15 October 1962;
- Andoversford; opened 1 June 1881; closed 15 October 1962; convergence of M&SWJR line;
- Andoversford Tunnel; 384 yards;
- Charlton Kings; opened 1 June 1881; closed 15 October 1962;
- Leckhampton; opened 1 June 1881; renamed Cheltenham South and Leckhampton 1906; renamed Cheltenham Leckhampton 1952; closed 15 October 1962;
- Gloucester Loop Junction; divergence of Hatherley Loop;
- Lansdown Junction; convergence with Gloucester to Cheltenham main line;
- Cheltenham Spa Malvern Road; GWR station; opened 30 March 1908; closed 1 January 1917; reopened 7 July 1919; closed 3 January 1966;
- Cheltenham Spa St. James; GWR station; opened as Cheltenham 23 October 1847; relocated to east 9 September 1884; renamed Cheltenham St James 1908; closed 3 January 1966;

The Hatherley loop ran from Gloucester Loop Junction to Hatherley Junction, leading towards Gloucester on the Cheltenham to Gloucester main line.
