= The Theatre Chipping Norton =

Arts centre in Chipping Norton, England

Coordinates: 51.94317°N 1.54498°W

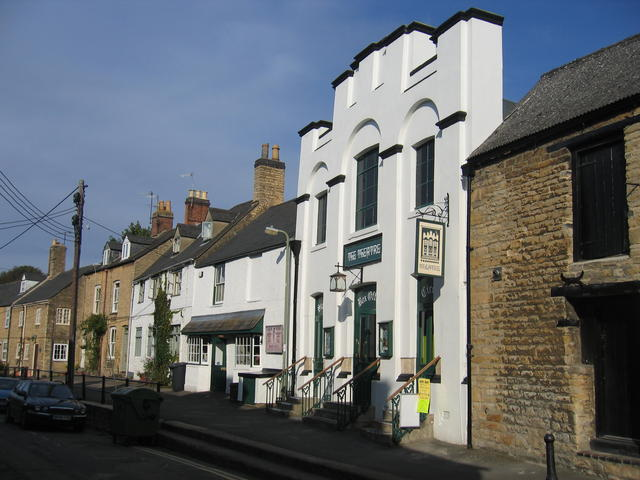
The façade in 2006

The Theatre Chipping Norton, sometimes The Theatre, Chipping Norton, is a multi-arts theatre, cinema, gallery and music venue in Chipping Norton, Oxfordshire, England.

The proscenium arch theatre has 217 seats including stalls and a balcony. Over 55,000 patrons attend annually. It is one of the UK's smallest producing theatres.

== History ==
The main auditorium was originally a Salvation Army citadel, built in 1888. After some years as a furniture warehouse it was bought by two RSC actors in 1968 and fundraising began in 1973, the theatre was registered as a charity in 1974, and it opened as a theatre in 1975. It acquired adjoining properties to provide space for bar, gallery, green rooms, offices and rehearsal space, and underwent a major refurbishment in 1996 with Arts Council England assistance.

== Productions ==
The theatre produces original shows and hosts touring companies; in 2016 it co-produced with The Dukes a 20th-anniversary touring production of Stones in His Pockets.

It prides itself on its annual, original "world-renowned traditional family pantomime". There are usually up of one hundred performances a year. The former Goody and I’m Sorry I Haven’t A Clue panellist Graeme Garden wrote several pantomimes for The Theatre during the 1980s.
