= HMS Kingham =

Minesweeper of the Royal Navy

History

United Kingdom
- Name: HMS Kingham
- Namesake: Kingham
- Builder: J. Samuel White
- Launched: 26 January 1955
- Completed: 1 June 1955
- Identification: Pennant number(s): M2704 / IMS41
- Fate: transferred to France, 1955

France
- Name: Pâquerette (M775)
- Stricken: 4 May 1988
- Identification: Pennant number(s): A742 / P742
- Fate: Sold, 25 January 1996

General characteristics
- Class & type: Ham-class minesweeper
- Displacement: 120 tons standard; 164 tons full
- Length: 106 ft 6 in (32.46 m)
- Beam: 22 ft (6.7 m)
- Draught: 5 ft 9 in (1.75 m)
- Propulsion: 2 shaft Paxman 12YHAXM diesels, 1,100 bhp (820 kW)
- Speed: 14 knots (26 km/h)
- Complement: 2 officers, 13 ratings
- Armament: 1 × Bofors 40 mm L/60 gun / 20 mm Oerlikon gun

HMS Kingham was a Ham-class minesweeper of the Royal Navy.

Their names were all chosen from villages ending in -ham. The minesweeper was named after Kingham in Oxfordshire.
