= Kingham railway station =

Railway station in Oxfordshire, England

Coordinates: 51.902°N 1.629°W

Kingham
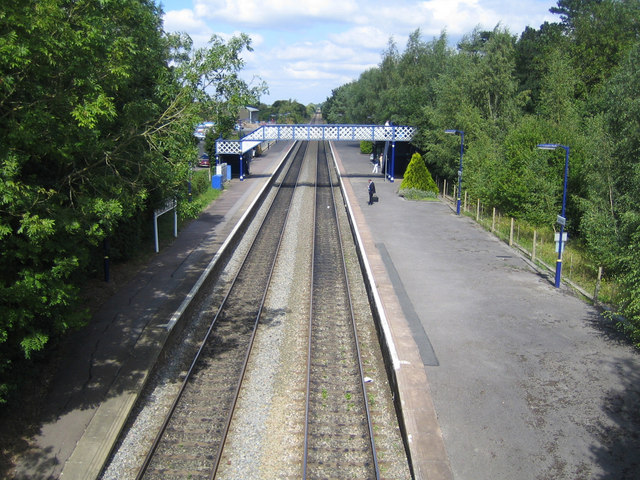

General information
- Location: Kingham, West Oxfordshire; England
- Grid reference: SP256227
- Manager: Great Western Railway
- Platforms: 2

Other information
- Station code: KGM
- Classification: DfT category E

History
- Opened: 10 August 1855
- Original company: Oxford, Worcester and Wolverhampton Railway
- Pre-grouping: Great Western Railway
- Post-grouping: Great Western Railway

Key dates
- 4 June 1853: Evesham to Oxford line opened
- 10 August 1855: Chipping Norton Railway opened Station opened as Chipping Norton Junction
- 1 March 1862: Bourton-on-the-Water Railway opened
- 8 January 1906: Flyover opened
- 1 May 1909: Station renamed Kingham

Passengers
- 2020/21: ▼39,014
- 2021/22: ▲0.163 million
- 2022/23: ▲0.206 million
- 2023/24: ▼0.195 million
- 2024/25: ▲0.252 million
Location
Notes
- Passenger statistics from the Office of Rail and Road

Kingham railway station in Oxfordshire, England, is between the Oxfordshire village of Kingham and the Gloucestershire village of Bledington, to which it is closer. It is also the closest station to the town of Chipping Norton.

The station is on the Cotswold Line and is served by Great Western Railway trains.

== History ==
When the Oxford, Worcester and Wolverhampton Railway was extended from Evesham to Wolvercot Junction (north of Oxford) on 4 June 1853, there was no station between Adlestrop and Shipton. On 10 August 1855 a branch line to Chipping Norton was opened by the Chipping Norton Railway, and a station, known as Chipping Norton Junction, was opened at the junction of the branch with the OW&W; this branch was purchased by the OW&W in 1859. The OW&W amalgamated with other railways on 1 July 1860 to form the West Midland Railway; this in turn amalgamated with the Great Western Railway on 1 August 1863. In the meantime, a second branch line from Chipping Norton Junction, the Bourton-on-the-Water railway, had opened on 1 March 1862; that railway was absorbed by the GWR on 1 February 1874.

On 1 June 1881 the first section of the Banbury and Cheltenham Direct Railway was opened; this connected the Bourton-on-the-Water branch to the Cheltenham & Great Western Union line at Lansdown Junction, Cheltenham; and on 6 April 1887 a second section was opened, connecting the Chipping Norton branch to the Oxford and Rugby Railway at King's Sutton. The Great Western Railway took over the B&CDR on 1 July 1897, but for nearly twenty years, through trains running between Banbury and Cheltenham Spa St. James needed to reverse at Chipping Norton Junction.

The reversal was inconvenient for trains which did not need to call at Chipping Norton Junction, so for their benefit the GWR built a bridge to carry through trains between Banbury and Cheltenham over the Oxford and Worcester line; it opened to goods trains on 8 January 1906 and to passenger trains on 1 May 1906. The station was renamed Kingham on 1 May 1909.

Upon the opening of this new link, a new express train service began to use the line, including the new flyover, once a day in each direction. This train, unofficially known as the Ports to Ports Express, was a collaboration between the North Eastern Railway, the Great Central Railway and the GWR, which from 1 May 1906 ran between Newcastle and Cardiff Central via York, Sheffield Victoria, Leicester Central, Banbury, Gloucester and Newport; in August 1906 it was extended to serve Barry, via the Barry Railway; in July 1909 a through coach to and from Hull was introduced. It ran non-stop between Banbury and Cheltenham South and Leckhampton, but even so, took 82 minutes for this 44.75-mile (72.02 km) stretch. It was suspended during the First World War, reinstated on 12 July 1919 and extended to Swansea in 1920; on the outbreak of war in September 1939, the service was again suspended, but when reintroduced in October 1946, it used a different route between Banbury and Newport.

During the Second World War new sidings were installed in 1942 on both the Worcester and the Oxford sides of the station for marshalling trains and unloading munitions. By 1943 the area's road verges were stacked with shells and bombs and the depot was the largest US ammunition depot in England. In 1946-47 about 80 War Department (WD) 2-8-0 Austerity locomotives, some with military insignia, were stored at Kingham by the GWR pending decisions about their disposal and future use.

In 1953, rationalisation was carried out which resulted in the closure of the East and West signal boxes and the singling of the line between them for working purposes. The remaining track between the boxes formed the base of a self-contained triangle for turning engines. By this time, the line to King's Sutton was open only for freight and a token passenger service operated to Chipping Norton.

British Railways withdrew passenger services from Kingham to Cheltenham and Chipping Norton in 1962, and freight services in 1964. British Rail designated the Oxford and Worcester line "The Cotswold Line". Passenger traffic increased in the 1990s and 2000s.

In 2015, a car park extension was added with 100 car spaces. A new footbridge was also added, with provision for passenger lifts.

=== Locomotive depot ===
A small depot was constructed in 1881 for the Cheltenham extension; this was in the Chipping Norton branch fork, and had a 22-foot (6.7 m) turntable, which was too small for a tender locomotive to be turned. This was replaced by a 44 ft 9 in (13.64 m) turntable early in the twentieth century, large enough for a "Dean Goods" 0-6-0 tender locomotive; however, the depot closed in 1906. It was rebuilt, reopening again in 1913, as a sub-shed of Worcester, but the turntable was later removed, and the depot finally closed in December 1962.

== Appearances in television and film ==
Kingham station was used as the setting for an episode (S3 E5) of BBC comedy This Country. The episode was first broadcast on 16 March 2020.

== Accidents and incidents ==
- On 15 July 1966, an express passenger train was derailed due to an unsecured switch blade on a set of points. Eighteen people were injured.

== Services ==
Great Western Railway operate all services at Kingham. The typical off-peak service at the station in trains per hour is:

- 1 tph to London Paddington
- 1 tph to Worcester Foregate Street of which some continue to Great Malvern and Hereford

Preceding station	National Rail	Following station
Moreton-in-Marsh	Great Western Railway; Cotswold Line	Shipton (Charlbury on Sundays)
	Historical railways	
Adlestrop; Line open, station closed	Great Western Railway; Oxford, Worcester and Wolverhampton Railway	Shipton; Line and station open
	Disused railways	
Stow-on-the-Wold; Line and station closed	Great Western Railway; Banbury and Cheltenham Direct Railway	Sarsden Halt; Line and station closed

== Bus services ==
Two bus routes serve the station. Pulham & Sons runs route 802 to Bourton-on-the-Water via Stow-on-the-Wold on behalf of Gloucestershire County Council and route X8 to Chipping Norton via Churchill on behalf of Oxfordshire County Council. Route 802 runs Monday to Saturday. Route X8 runs Monday to Friday only, peak hours only.
