= Bloxham railway station =

Former railway station in Oxfordshire, England

Coordinates: 52.01497°N 1.38115°W

Bloxham
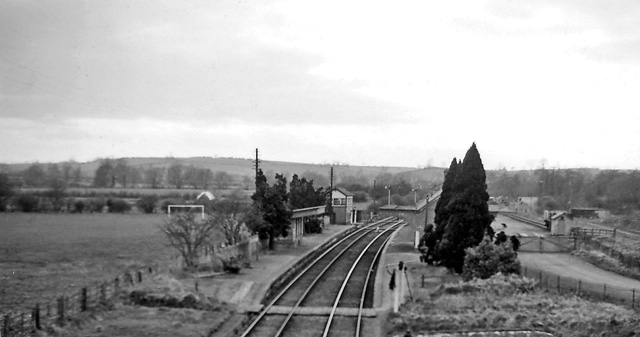
- Remains of Bloxham Station in 1961

General information
- Location: Bloxham, Cherwell; England
- Grid reference: SP427354
- Platforms: 2

Other information
- Status: Disused

History
- Original company: Banbury and Cheltenham Direct Railway
- Pre-grouping: Great Western Railway
- Post-grouping: Great Western Railway; Western Region of British Railways

Key dates
- 6 April 1887: Station opens
- 4 June 1951: Station closes to passengers
- 4 November 1963: Station closes to goods
Location

Bloxham railway station served the village of Bloxham in northern Oxfordshire, England.

== History ==
The station was built by the Banbury and Cheltenham Direct Railway, which was taken over by the Great Western Railway before its opening.

The station had two platforms, a passing loop and a signal box of Gloucester Wagon Company design. There was a goods shed and two-siding goods yard.

In 1907 signalling changes were made utilising re-assembled equipment originally from Bays Hill, Cheltenham. Hemmings states that a new signal box was provided in this year, Jenkins dates the box to 1890-5 and suggests that only the frame and locking were installed in 1907.

The station acquired fame in the 1920s for its extensive gardens which included “Lawns, paths and treillage, rose borders and rock gardens”. The gardens were the creation of the Station Master, Herbert Lloyd, and regularly won the GWR Worcester Division garden competition.

By 1938 passenger numbers were small with an average of only two or three tickets per day sold in that year After the outbreak of the Second World War, Bloxham, Hook Norton and Adderbury stations came under the control of a single station-master.

When Britain's railways were nationalised in 1948 the B&CDR became part of the Western Region of British Railways. On 2 June 1951 British Railways withdrew passenger services from the line through Bloxham. On 4 November 1963 BR closed the railway to freight traffic and some time thereafter the line was dismantled.

== Film appearances ==
In 1931 1st Bloxham Scouts produced a film "On the Track" including scenes showing a GWR express seen from the windows of the signal box. No copies of this film are believed to have survived. The documentary film "Twenty-four Square Miles" (1946) includes a scene showing a passenger train departing from Bloxham.

== Route ==
Preceding station	Disused railways	Following station
Hook Norton; Line and station closed	Great Western Railway; Banbury and Cheltenham Direct Railway	Milton Halt; Line and station closed
