= Rollright Halt railway station =

Former railway station in Oxfordshire, England

Coordinates: 51.9695°N 1.5296°W

Rollright Halt

General information
- Location: Great Rollright, West Oxfordshire; England
- Grid reference: SP324302
- Platforms: 1

Other information
- Status: Disused

History
- Original company: Great Western Railway
- Pre-grouping: Great Western Railway
- Post-grouping: Great Western Railway; Western Region of British Railways

Key dates
- 12 December 1906: Station opens
- 4 June 1951: Station closes
- 3 December 1962: Goods siding closes
Location

Rollright Halt railway station served the village of Great Rollright in Oxfordshire, England.

== History ==
The station was built by the Great Western Railway. Local residents had campaigned for a station to serve Great Rollright since 1875. When Britain's railways were nationalised in 1948 the B&CDR became part of the Western Region of British Railways. In 1951 British Railways withdrew passenger services from the line through Rollright Halt. In 1962 BR closed the railway to freight traffic and some time thereafter the line was dismantled.

== Rollright Siding ==
On 1 January 1909 a goods siding was opened 200 yards east of the passenger halt. A small platform and corrugated iron goods shed were provided. Incoming traffic was mostly coal for the local merchant James Taplin and also for Nash's of Long Compton. Outgoing traffic included pheasants and sugar beet. In April 1958 the line was blocked by a landslide between Rollright and Hook Norton, after this the siding was served from Chipping Norton only until closure in 1962. The final train ran on 30 November 1962 when BR standard class 2 number 78001 removed the remaining wagons from the siding. Official closure came a few days later on 3 December 1962.

== Route ==
| Preceding station | Disused railways | Following station |
|---|---|---|
| Chipping Norton; Line and station closed | Great Western Railway; Banbury and Cheltenham Direct Railway | Hook Norton; Line and station closed |
