= Shipton railway station =

Railway station in Oxfordshire, England

Coordinates: 51.866°N 1.593°W

Shipton
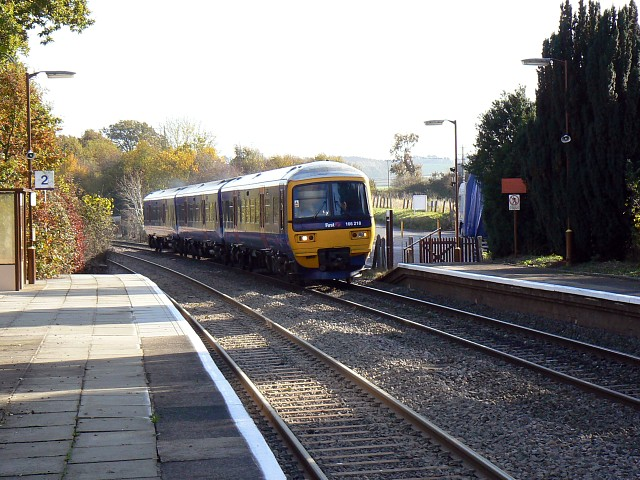
- Shipton railway station in 2007

General information
- Location: Shipton-under-Wychwood, West Oxfordshire; England
- Grid reference: SP281186
- Manager: Great Western Railway
- Platforms: 2

Other information
- Station code: SIP
- Classification: DfT category F2

History
- Opened: 4 June 1853
- Original company: Oxford, Worcester and Wolverhampton Railway
- Pre-grouping: Great Western Railway
- Post-grouping: GWR

Passengers
- 2021/22: ▲2,250
- 2022/23: ▲2,354
- 2023/24: ▲3,692
- 2024/25: ▲3,904
- 2025/26: ▲4,380
Location
Notes
- Passenger statistics from the Office of Rail and Road

Shipton railway station serves the villages of Shipton-under-Wychwood and Milton-under-Wychwood in Oxfordshire, England. The station and all trains serving it are operated by Great Western Railway.

== Services ==
Shipton is served by 2-3 trains in each direction each weekday. The up trains are a morning service to Didcot Parkway and an early evening service to Oxford, which is operated by a Class 800 Intercity Express Train (IET). The down services are an early evening service to Evesham, an evening service to London Paddington and two later services to Worcester.

Up Saturday services are enhanced, with four services running through to London Paddington. Down Saturday services consist of one afternoon train and three evening trains originating from Paddington and running to Worcester or Great Malvern.

There is no Sunday service from Shipton in either direction. A normal service weekday service operates on most bank holidays.

Preceding station	National Rail	Following station
Kingham	Great Western Railway; Cotswold Line; Mondays-Saturdays only	Ascott-under-Wychwood (Charlbury on Saturdays)
