= Hook Norton railway station =

Former railway station in Oxfordshire, England

Coordinates: 51.9993°N 1.4728°W

Hook Norton
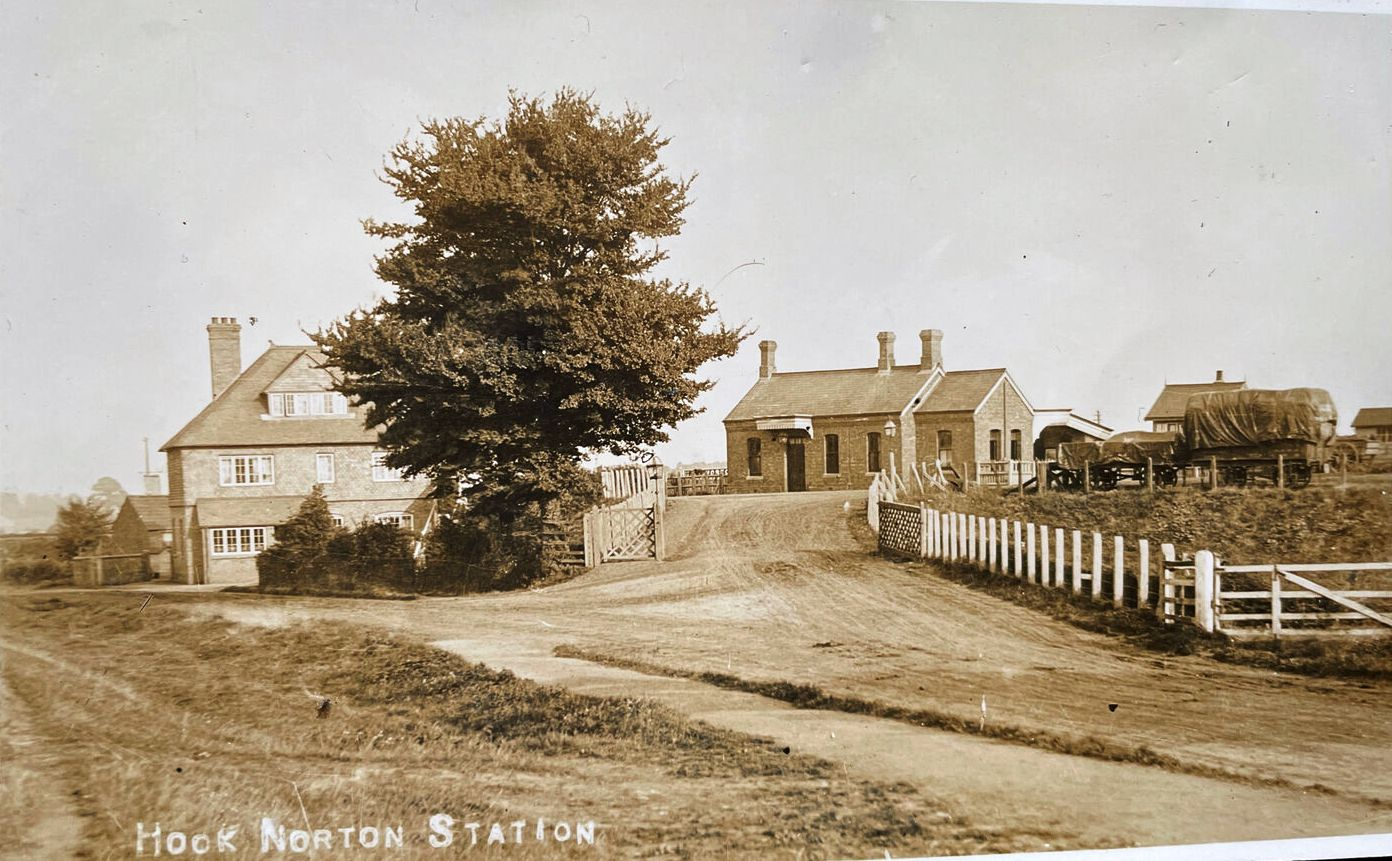
- The station in 1910

General information
- Location: Hook Norton, Cherwell; England
- Grid reference: SP363335
- Platforms: 2

Other information
- Status: Disused

History
- Original company: Banbury and Cheltenham Direct Railway
- Pre-grouping: Great Western Railway
- Post-grouping: Great Western Railway; Western Region of British Railways

Key dates
- 6 Apr 1887: Station opens
- 4 June 1951: Station closes
- 4 November 1963: closed for freight
Location

Hook Norton railway station served the village of Hook Norton in northern Oxfordshire, England.

== History ==
The station was built for the Banbury and Cheltenham Direct Railway, which was operated by the Great Western Railway before complete takeover in 1897. Following the passing of the Act of Parliament in 1873 authorising the construction of the B&CDR, it was announced in 1874 that a station would be provided at Hook Norton. The location originally proposed was north of the Milcombe Road and a start had been made on construction at this site but this was abandoned in 1883 in favour of a site to the south, slightly nearer the village.

On 2 June 1884 it was reported that "Hook Norton Station is built nearly up to the level of the doors". The entire station and goods yard were built on a large embankment containing 120,000 cubic yards (92,000 m^{3}) of earth, which led onto the first of Hook Norton's two viaducts. In order to provide solid foundations, the platforms were supported on iron girders and the station building had a 20-foot (6 m) deep cellar. Hook Norton was a passing place with two platforms. The main station building containing booking office, waiting rooms and toilets was on the up platform while the down platform had a small waiting shelter. The first train ran on 6 April 1887.

There were a number of ironstone quarries around Hook Norton. In the 1890s the Hook Norton Ironstone Partnership were dispatching ore by rail, with sidings on the south side of the down platform. From the sidings a steep standard gauge line ran in a curve, passing under the viaduct to a tipping dock where ore was tipped from a 20 in (508 mm) gauge tramway line. This line was operated by an 0-6-0 Manning Wardle locomotive named Hook Norton The sidings were subsequently turned into loops with the addition of a connection at the west end. The partnership was wound up in 1903 and the sidings became the property of the GWR.

In 1907 they were extended towards Banbury, forming a loop which could hold sixty mineral wagons. A new signal box was opened on the up platform at this time. The GWR also acquired the locomotive Hook Norton which was subsequently used on the Weymouth Harbour Tramway for many years. In 1899 the Brymbo Ironworks of Wrexham established a new quarry at Hook Norton, which it connected to the railway at Council Hill Sidings, 3/4 mile (1.2 km) east of the station, with a narrow gauge railway. The Brymbo Ironworks closed in 1946 and was dismantled in 1948.

In 1929 the GWR began operating a bus service between Chipping Norton and Banbury via Hook Norton. In the early 1930s this service was transferred to Midland Red and became a serious competitor to the railway's passenger service, having the advantage of a direct journey to Banbury compared to the circuitous route taken by the railway. In the period 1935-9 only 40-64 rail tickets per week were sold. In 1930 the station had a staff of four: a stationmaster, two porters and two signalmen.

When Britain's railways were nationalised in 1948 the B&CDR became part of the Western Region of British Railways. Passenger numbers remained low - a teacher who travelled to Hook Norton from Chipping Norton once a week recalled that on several occasions he was given consecutively numbered tickets. In 1951 British Railways withdrew passenger services from the line through Hook Norton. In 1958 a landslide at Hook Norton caused freight services to be discontinued between Hook Norton and Chipping Norton. On 4 November 1963 BR closed the railway to freight traffic and the line was dismantled in 1965.

== Route ==
| Preceding station | Disused railways | Following station |
|---|---|---|
| Rollright Halt; Line and station closed | Great Western Railway; Banbury and Cheltenham Direct Railway | Bloxham; Line and station closed |
