= Chipping Norton =

Market town in West Oxfordshire, England

Coordinates: 51.94°N 1.55°W

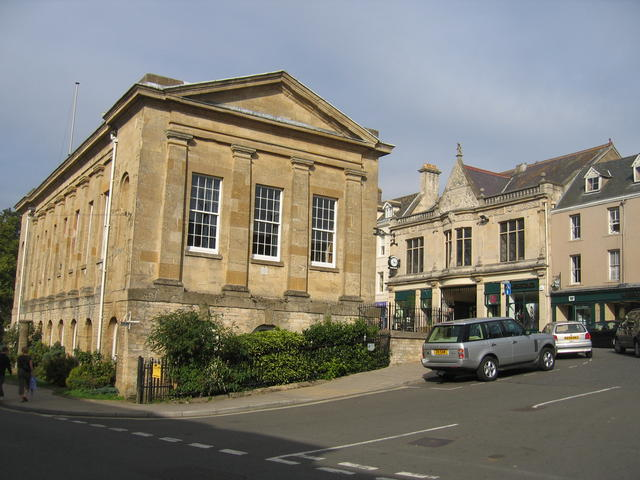
- Chipping Norton Town Hall, built 1842

- Location within Oxfordshire
- Population: 5,719 (2011 Census)
- OS grid reference: SP309269
  - London: 74 1/2 miles (120 km)
- Civil parish: Chipping Norton
- District: West Oxfordshire
- Shire county: Oxfordshire
- Region: South East
- Country: England
- Sovereign state: United Kingdom
- Post town: Chipping Norton
- Postcode district: OX7
- Dialling code: 01608
- Police: Thames Valley
- Fire: Oxfordshire
- Ambulance: South Central
- UK Parliament: Banbury
- Website: Chipping Norton Town Council

Chipping Norton is a market town and civil parish in the Cotswolds in the West Oxfordshire district of Oxfordshire, England, about 12 miles (19 km) south-west of Banbury and 18 miles (29 km) north-west of Oxford. The 2011 Census recorded the civil parish population as 5,719. It was estimated at 6,254 in 2019.

== History ==
=== Pre-1800 ===
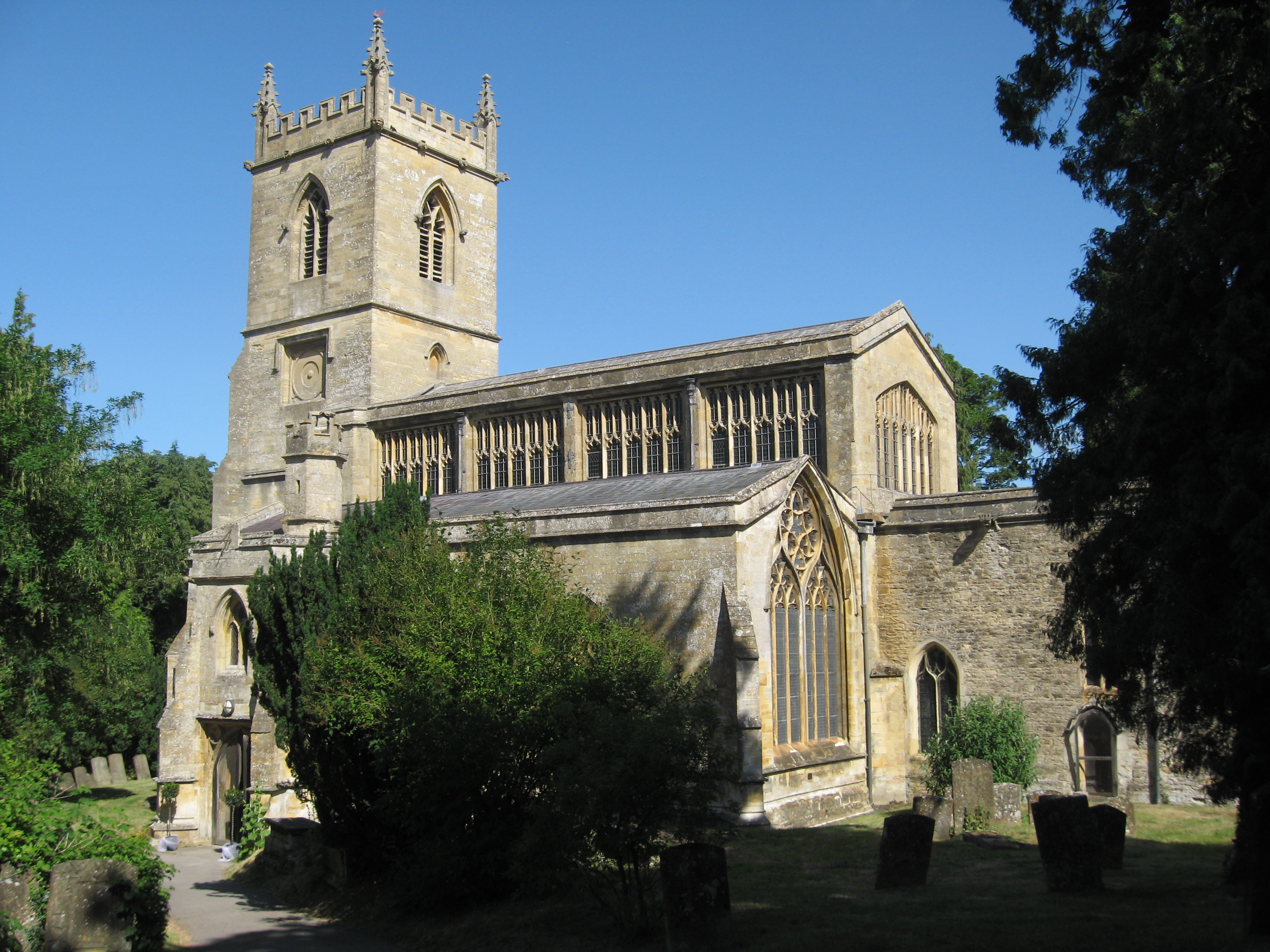
St Mary the Virgin parish church, rebuilt c. 1485

The Rollright Stones, a stone circle 2 1/2 miles (4 kilometres) north of Chipping Norton, reflect prehistoric habitation in the area. The town name means "market north town", with "Chipping" (from Old English cēping) meaning "market". Chipping Norton began as a small settlement beneath a hill, where the earthworks of the motte-and-bailey Chipping Norton Castle can still be seen. The Church of England parish church dedicated to St Mary the Virgin stands on the hill next to the castle. Parts of today's building may date from the 12th century. It retains features of the 13th and 14th centuries. The nave was largely rebuilt in about 1485 with a Perpendicular Gothic clerestory. It is believed to have been funded by John Ashfield, a wool merchant, making St Mary's an example of a "wool church".

In July 1549, the Vicar of Chipping Norton, Henry Joyes or Joyce, led parishioners in a popular rising after the suppression of chantries and other religious reforms left him to minister alone to a congregation of 800 and reduced the budget for schooling. The rising was brutally put down by Lord Grey de Wilton. Joyes was captured, then hanged in chains from the tower of his church. The bell tower rebuilt in 1825 has a ring of eight bells, all cast in 1907 by Mears and Stainbank of Whitechapel Bell Foundry. It also has a Sanctus bell cast in 1624 by Roger I Purdue of Bristol.

Wool in the Middle Ages made the Cotswolds one of England's wealthiest parts and many of the medieval buildings survive in the centre of Chipping Norton. There is still a market every Wednesday and a mop fair in September, when the High Street is closed to through traffic. In 1205 a new market place was laid out higher up the hill. Sheep farming was largely displaced by arable, but agriculture remained important. Many original houses round the market place received fashionable Georgian façades in the 18th century. An inscription on the almshouses records them as founded in 1640 as "The work and gift of Henry Cornish, gent".

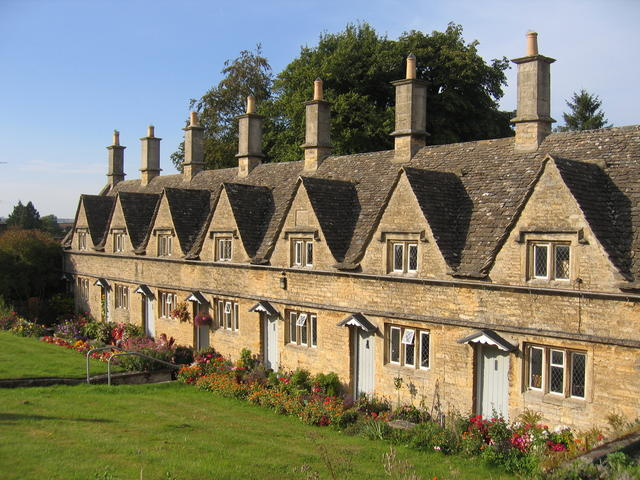
Chipping Norton Almshouses, founded in 1640

In the mid-18th century, extract of willow bark became recognized for its soothing effects on fever, pain, and inflammation after the Revd Edward Stone of Chipping Norton (1702–1768) noticed that the bitter taste of willow bark resembled the taste of the bark of the cinchona tree, known as "Peruvian bark", which was used successfully in Peru to treat a variety of ailments. Stone experimented with preparations of powdered willow bark on people in the town for five years. He found it to be as effective as Peruvian bark and a cheaper domestic version, and in 1763 he sent a report of his findings to the Royal Society in London. His discovery became the basis of the drug aspirin. A blue plaque commemorating his work is displayed on a building in West Street near the Fox Hotel.

=== Post-1800 ===
In 1796, James and William Hitchman founded Hitchman's Brewery in West Street. The business moved in 1849 to a larger brewery in Albion Street that included a malthouse and its own water wells. Three generations of Hitchmans ran this, but in 1890 Alfred Hitchman sold it as a limited company that acquired other breweries in 1891 and 1917. In 1924, it merged with Hunt Edmunds of Banbury; in 1931, the brewery here was closed. Other local industries included a woollen mill (see below), a glove-maker, a tannery and an iron foundry.

Chipping Norton had a workhouse by the 1770s. In 1836 the architect George Wilkinson built a larger one with four wings round an octagonal central building, similar to one he was building at Witney. The architect G. E. Street added a chapel to Chipping Norton workhouse in 1856–1857. The building became a hospital in the Second World War. It was taken over by the National Health Service in 1948 as Cotshill Hospital, later became a psychiatric hospital, and was closed in 1983. It has been redeveloped as private residences.

The Town Hall, designed in the neoclassical style was completed in 1842.

Chipping Norton Railway (CNR) opened in 1855, linking with Kingham on the Oxford, Worcester and Wolverhampton Railway. In 1887, a second railway opened to the Oxford and Rugby Railway at King's Sutton and the CNR became part of the Banbury and Cheltenham Direct Railway (B&CDR). Extending the railway from Chipping Norton involved a tunnel 685 yards (626 m) long under Elmsfield Farm west of the town. In 1951, British Railways withdrew passenger services between Chipping Norton and Banbury. In 1962, it closed the station at Kingham, and two years later the B&CDR to freight, and dismantled the line. The disused railway tunnel is bricked up at both ends for safety and used as a refuge for bats. (See Wildlife and Countryside Act 1981)

In May 1873, rioting occurred after the sentencing of the Ascott Martyrs – 16 local women accused of trying to interfere with strikebreakers at a farm. Bliss Tweed Mill in the west of town was built as a tweed mill by William Bliss in 1872. In 1913 to 1914, the millworkers struck for eight months. The mill closed in 1980 and was turned into flats. It remains a landmark, visible from Worcester Road. The neoclassical Holy Trinity Roman Catholic church was built in 1836 by the architect John Adey Repton, grandson of the English garden designer Humphry Repton.

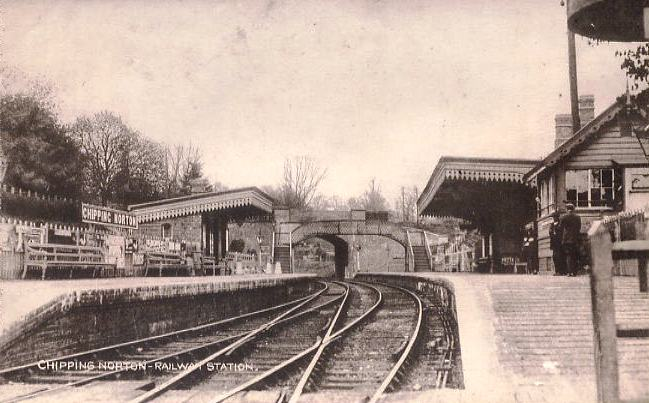
Chipping Norton railway station, opened in 1855, pictured here in the early 1900s

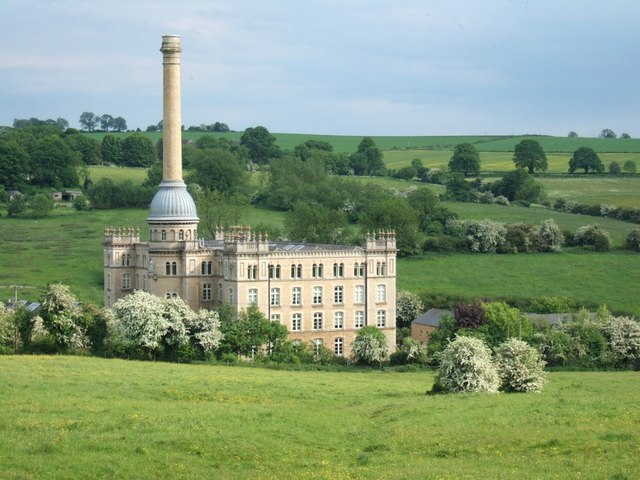
Bliss Mill, built in 1872

== Governance ==
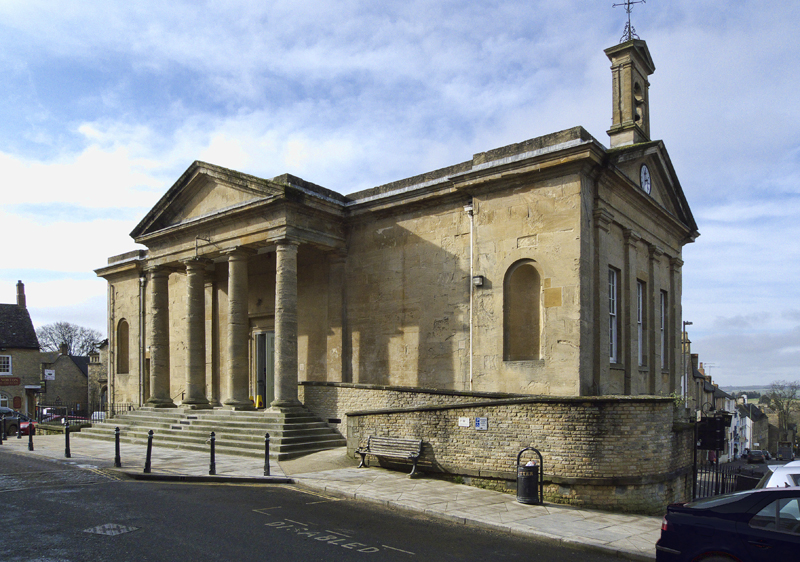
Town Hall: meeting place of the town council

There are three tiers of local government covering Chipping Norton, at civil parish (town), district and county level: Chipping Norton Town Council, West Oxfordshire District Council and Oxfordshire County Council. The town council meets at the Town Hall and has its offices in the 16th century Guildhall at the opposite end of the Market Place.

From 1983 until May 2024, Chipping Norton was in the Witney parliamentary constituency, whose Member of Parliament from 2001 to 2016 was David Cameron, prime minister from 2010 to 2016 and leader of the Conservative Party from 2005. From 2016 to 2024 the MP was the Conservative Robert Courts. Boundary changes for the 2024 general election placed Chipping Norton in the Banbury parliamentary constituency, with new Labour MP Sean Woodcock being elected. One Conservative and two Labour councillors represent the town on West Oxfordshire District Council.

=== Administrative history ===
Chipping Norton was an ancient parish. It was subdivided into two townships, being Over Norton to the north and a Chipping Norton township covering the rest of the parish to the south, including the town itself. Such townships became separate civil parishes in 1866.

In 1607 the township of Chipping Norton was granted a charter which incorporated it as a borough. Prior to that, the town had been a lower status seigneurial borough, controlled by the lord of the manor. The borough was reformed to become a municipal borough in 1836 under the Municipal Corporations Act 1835, which standardised how most boroughs operated across the country.

The borough of Chipping Norton was abolished in 1974 under the Local Government Act 1972. District-level functions passed to the new West Oxfordshire District Council. A successor parish called Chipping Norton was created covering the area of the abolished borough, with its parish council taking the name Chipping Norton Town Council.

== Culture ==
The town's theatre, The Theatre Chipping Norton, began life as a Salvation Army Citadel, its first stones, now visible in the auditorium, being laid in 1888. It continued as a furniture warehouse before being spotted by two Royal Shakespeare Company actors, Tamara and John Malcolm, in 1968. In 1973, fundraising for the new theatre began in earnest, and a pantomime, Beauty and the Beast was staged in the town hall. The Theatre was opened in 1975 by Tom Baker (who played the title character, the Doctor, in the BBC science-fiction TV show Doctor Who), beginning with a light programme including films and lunchtime jazz. The adjoining cottage was bought and converted into the bar and gallery. In 1990 a building bought in Goddards Lane now houses the green room, offices, and rehearsal room.

In 2023, a cinema opened in the town. The Living Room Cinema has two screens as well as a bar.

The town hosts annual arts festivals: Chipping Norton Literary Festival ('ChipLitFest'), Chipping Norton Music Festival, and a jazz festival. The Theatre Chipping Norton opened in 1975 as a theatre, cinema, gallery and music venue for original productions and touring companies.

The town has a Women's Institute, a Rotary Club, and a Lions Club.

== Infrastructure ==
The town acts as a retail and leisure centre, with three supermarkets and numerous shops, including branches of national chain stores. It has six pubs, two hotels with public bars, and three schools. Holy Trinity Roman Catholic School and St Mary's Church of England School are primary schools. Chipping Norton School is the town's secondary school with a sixth form.

Chipping Norton has a purpose-built veterinary hospital, serving the community and the local zoos. The hospital's building was opened in July 2015 by then prime minister David Cameron. The previous premises were on Albion Street, where the practice had been based since it was founded in the 1970s. The hospital has a boarding cattery, a CT Scanner, and hosts one of only 15 radioiodine treatment units for hyperthyroid cats in the UK.

From 1989, the veterinary hospital had a partnership with the remote island of St Helena, using funding provided by the DfID for vets to visit the island. Since 2010, the island has had its own permanent vet and the connection has since been lost.

== Sports ==
Chipping Norton Golf Club, now the Cotswold Club and part of Cotswold Hotel and Spa, is the oldest in Oxfordshire. It began in 1890 on Chipping Norton Common.

The first XV of Chipping Norton Rugby Union Football Club plays in the Southern Counties North League. They were league champions in 2008.

Chipping Norton Town, nicknamed "The Magpies" or "Chippy", was founded in 1893 and played at Walterbush Road until the ground was sold to a housing developer and the club folded in 2016. Chipping Norton Town Swifts F.C. were created as a phoenix club in its place.

Chipping Norton Town Cricket Club plays in Oxfordshire Cricket Association Division 6. The town also has a bowls club.

== Landmarks ==
=== St Mary’s Church ===
The nave of St. Mary's Church in Chipping Norton, built circa 1485, is described by Pevsner as being one of the finest interiors in the county. The chancel and aisles are earlier, and contain 13th- and 14th-century work. The west tower was rebuilt in 1825. At the east end of the south aisle is a large Decorated window which is thought to have been brought from the demolished Bruern Abbey in Oxfordshire. There is a fourteenth-century octagonal font and a two-storeyed fifteenth-century vestry. There are some damaged alabaster tomb effigies, and some monumental brasses are now displayed on wooden panels.

=== Recording studio ===
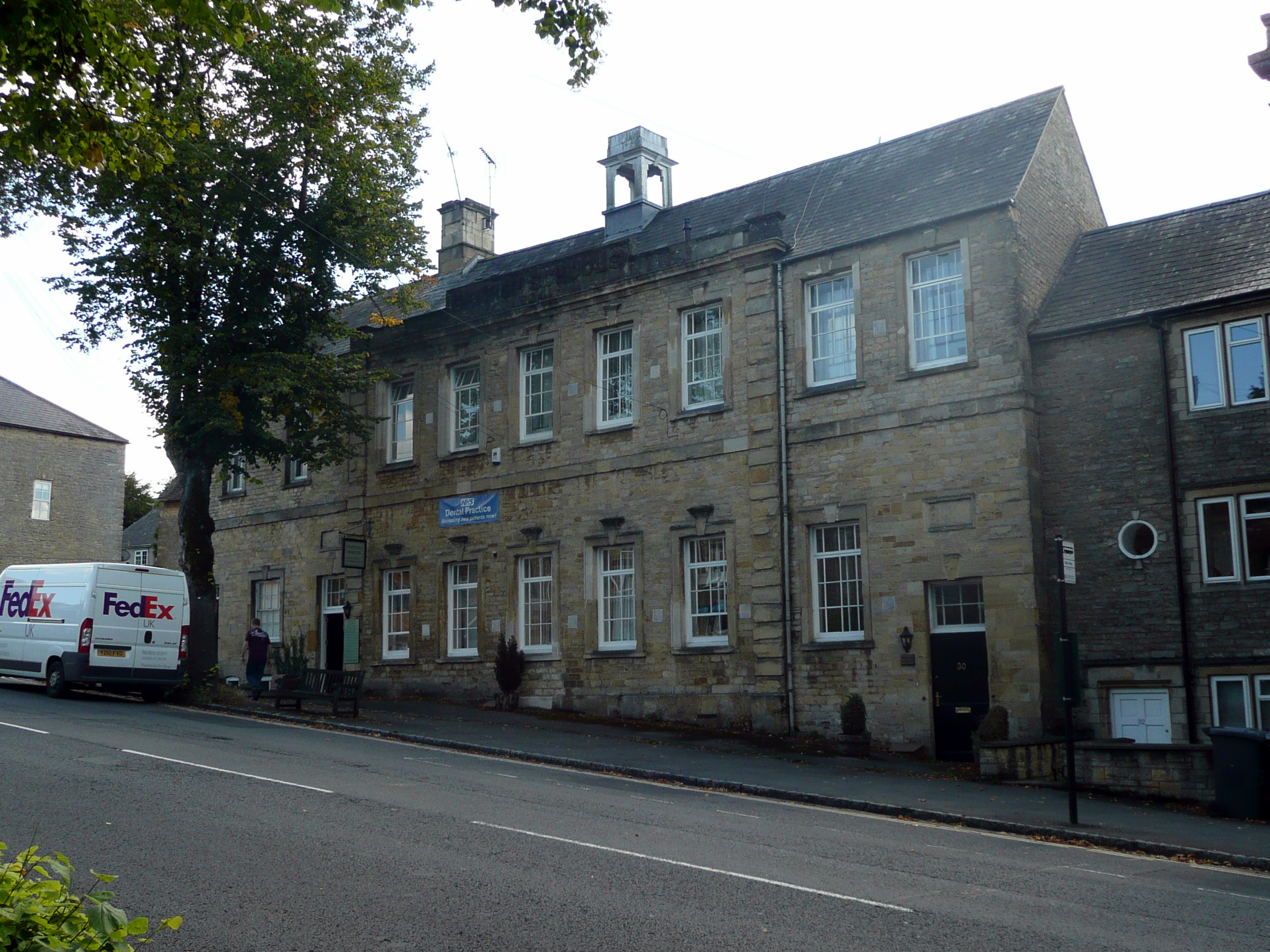
The former British Schools building at 28–30 New Street, subsequently Chipping Norton Recording Studios

From 1972 to 1999, the former British Schools building in New Street was Chipping Norton Recording Studios. Baker Street by Gerry Rafferty, In The Army Now by Status Quo, Too Shy by Kajagoogoo, I Should Have Known Better by Jim Diamond, Perfect by Fairground Attraction, I Just Died In Your Arms Tonight by Cutting Crew and Bye Bye Baby by the Bay City Rollers were recorded there. Jeff Beck, Barbara Dickson, Duran Duran, Marianne Faithfull, Alison Moyet, Nektar, Radiohead, The Supernaturals, Wet Wet Wet, XTC, Mark Owen and Chris Rea also used them.

=== Castle ===
Chipping Norton Castle was a timber Norman motte-and-bailey castle to the north-west of the town. Little of the original structures remains apart from earthworks. The remains have been a Scheduled Monument since 1949.

== Transport ==
Chipping Norton railway station served the town until 1962. The nearest stations now are at Kingham, Charlbury, and Ascott-under-Wychwood. A community bus network called The Villager links residential roads and nearby villages with the town centre. Longer-distance buses run to Oxford and Banbury. Stagecoach in Warwickshire operate service 50 to Stratford-upon-Avon. Pulhams Coaches operates the 801 to Cheltenham via Moreton-in-Marsh, Bourton-on-the-Water and Andoversford. Thames Travel operate the X9 service to Witney via Chadlington, Charlbury and Finstock.

== Media ==
Local news and television programmes are provided by BBC South and ITV Meridian. Television signals are received from the Oxford TV transmitter and the local relay transmitter situated north west of the town. BBC West Midlands and ITV Central can also be received from the Sutton Coldfield transmitter.

Local radio stations are BBC Radio Oxford on 95.2 FM, Heart South on 102.6 FM and Witney Radio that broadcast from Witney on 107.4 FM.

The town is served by these local newspapers: The Oxford Times and the Banbury Guardian. There is also a longstanding community newspaper, The Chipping Norton News, which is staffed by a volunteer team and published monthly.

== Chipping Norton set ==
Several media, political and show-business acquaintances living near the town, including former British Prime Minister David Cameron, have been called the "Chipping Norton set". Members regularly met socially. It gained notoriety after the News International phone hacking scandal, which involved several members. Those affected, along with several attending social functions, were victims of phone hacking by the News of the World. Notable group meetings included the nearby wedding reception of Rebekah and Charlie Brooks, a 2010 Christmas dinner at the Brooks's, and Elisabeth Murdoch and Matthew Freud's 2011 Summer party at Burford Priory.

== Twinning ==
Chipping Norton is twinned with Magny-en-Vexin in France.

== Notable residents ==
- Sarah Averill (later Sarah Wildes, 1627–1692) migrated to Salem, Massachusetts, where she was hanged for witchcraft.
- Michael Baldwin (born 1945), British conceptual artist, author and founding member of the Art & Language artist group, was born and lived in the town
- Geoffrey Burbidge (1925–2010), astronomy professor
- Jeremy Clarkson (born 1960), Top Gear and The Grand Tour presenter, journalist and writer (see also Clarkson's Farm)
- Kaleb Cooper (born 1998), farmer and author who appears on Clarkson's Farm starring Jeremy Clarkson.
- Richard Dawkins (born 1941), evolutionary biologist and author, moved there by 2023, whose family lived there since 1726.
- James Hind (1616–1652), highwayman born 1616 and executed for high treason in 1652
- Conroy Maddox (1912–2005), surrealist painter resident here in 1928–1933
- Janice Meek (born 1944), world record-holding ocean rower
- Wentworth Miller (born 1972), American actor, star of Prison Break, born here to American parents
- Keith Moon (1946–1978), The Who drummer, once owned the Crown and Cushion Hotel in the High Street
- Simon Nicol (born 1950), guitarist and vocalist with Fairport Convention
- Walter Padley (1916–1984), trade unionist and politician
- Dominic Sandbrook (born 1974), historian and columnist
- Rev. Edward Stone (1702–1768), discoverer of the active ingredient of aspirin, lived in the town.
- Barbara Toy (1908–2001), travel writer and playwright
- Tom Walkinshaw (1946–2010), racing driver and founder of Tom Walkinshaw Racing
- Elizabeth Jane Weston (1581 or 1582–1612), Neo-Latin poet, also known as Westonia, was born here
- Andy Wigmore (born 1966), political activist associated with Arron Banks and Nigel Farage; Belize diplomat
- Lucy Sarah Atkins Wilson (1801–1863), author and editor

== See also ==
- Chipping Norton Museum of Local History
- RAF Chipping Norton

== Sources ==
- Sherwood, Jennifer; Pevsner, Nikolaus (1974). Oxfordshire. The Buildings of England. Harmondsworth: Books Penguin. pp. 536–541. ISBN 0-14-071045-0.
- Vere Woodman, A. (1957). "The Buckinghamshire and Oxfordshire Rising of 1549" (PDF). Oxoniensia. XXII: 78–84.
- Volkin, Michael, ed. (2000). Nuffield Advanced Chemistry Students Book. London: Longman. ISBN 0-582-32835-7.
