= Salford, Oxfordshire =

Village in Oxfordshire, England

Coordinates: 51.952°N 1.582°W

Salford
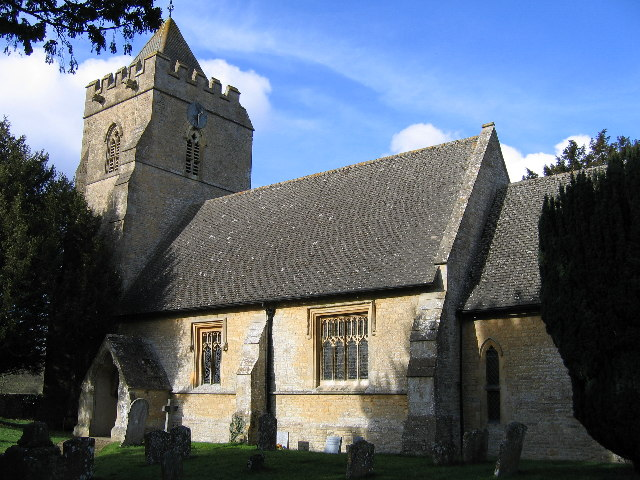
- St Mary the Virgin parish church

- Location within Oxfordshire
- Population: 356 (2011 Census)
- OS grid reference: SP2828
- Civil parish: Salford
- District: West Oxfordshire
- Shire county: Oxfordshire
- Region: South East
- Country: England
- Sovereign state: United Kingdom
- Post town: Chipping Norton
- Postcode district: OX7
- Dialling code: 01608
- Police: Thames Valley
- Fire: Oxfordshire
- Ambulance: South Central
- UK Parliament: Banbury
- Website: Salford Parish Council

Salford is a village and civil parish about 1 1/2 miles (2.4 km) west of Chipping Norton, Oxfordshire. The 2011 Census recorded the parish's population as 356.

== Parish church ==
The Church of England parish church of Saint Mary the Virgin was largely Norman until the Oxford Diocesan architect, the Gothic Revivalist G.E. Street almost completely rebuilt it in 1854. The font and parts of two doorways are among the few Norman features that Street retained. Street probably rebuilt the bell tower, but its Decorated Gothic bell openings survive. The tower has a ring of five bells, all of which were cast in 1687 by Matthew I Bagley and Henry II Bagley of Chacombe, Northamptonshire. The ecclesiastical parish is part of the Team Benefice of Chipping Norton, along with the parishes of Chastleton, Chipping Norton, Churchill, Cornwell, Daylesford, Kingham, Little Compton, Little Rollright and Over Norton.

== Amenities ==
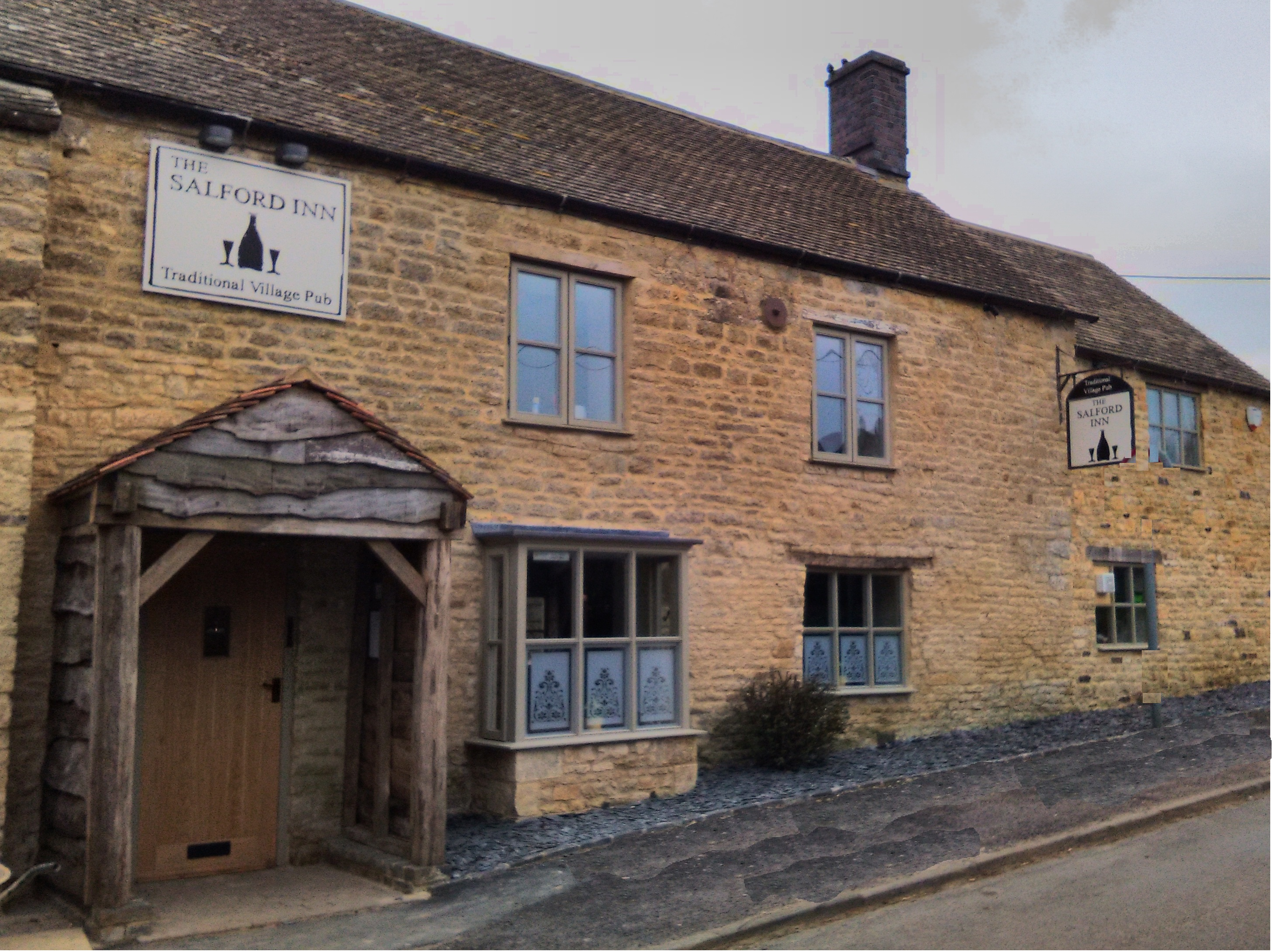
The Salford Inn

Salford has a public house, The Black Horse serving home made food and real ales with accommodation and beer garden.

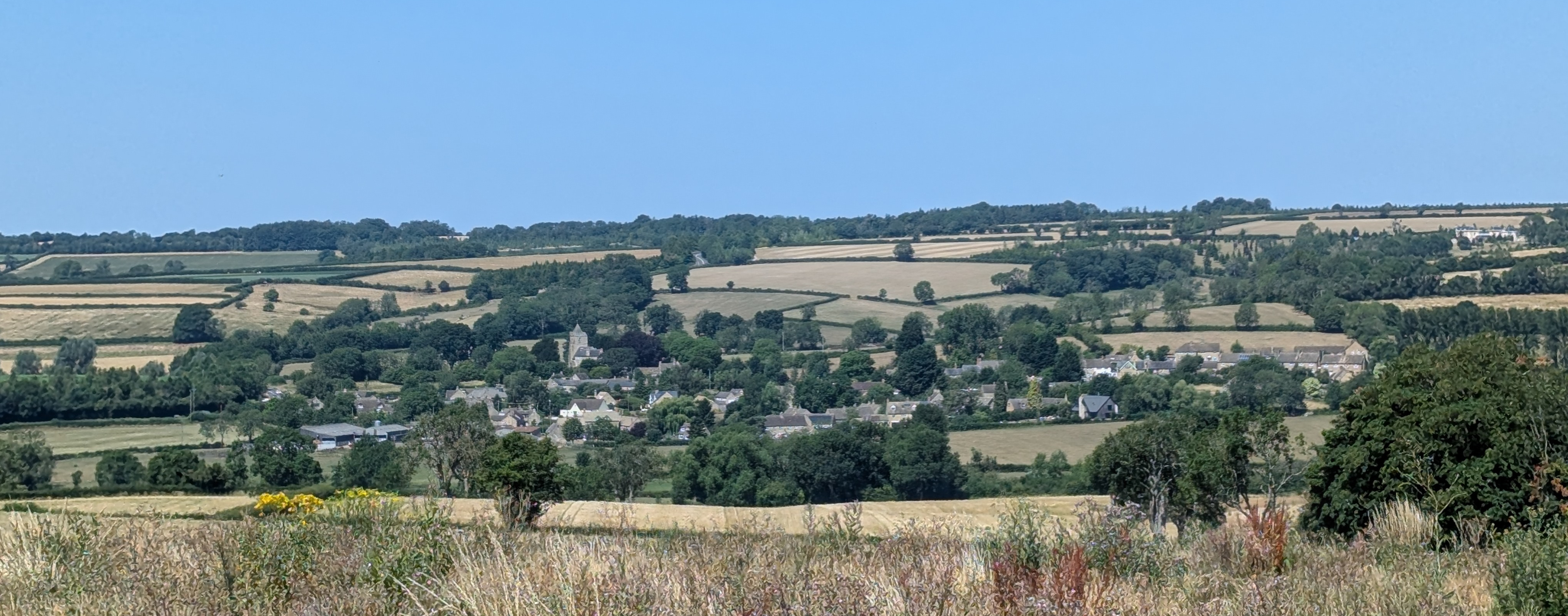
An overview of the village of Salford, Oxfordshire, England taken July 2025.

== Sources ==
- Sherwood, Jennifer; Pevsner, Nikolaus (1974). Oxfordshire. The Buildings of England. Harmondsworth: Penguin Books. p. 749. ISBN 0-14-071045-0.
