= Richard Cocks (disambiguation) =

Richard Cocks (1566–1624) was the head of the British East India Company trading post in Hirado, Japan.

Richard Cocks may also refer to:

- Sir Richard Cocks, 1st Baronet (c. 1602–1684) of the Cocks baronets
- Sir Richard Cocks, 2nd Baronet (c. 1659–1726), MP for Gloucestershire

== See also ==
- Richard Cox (disambiguation)
- Cocks (surname)
