= Little Rollright =

Hamlet in Oxfordshire, England

Coordinates: 51.968°N 1.576°W

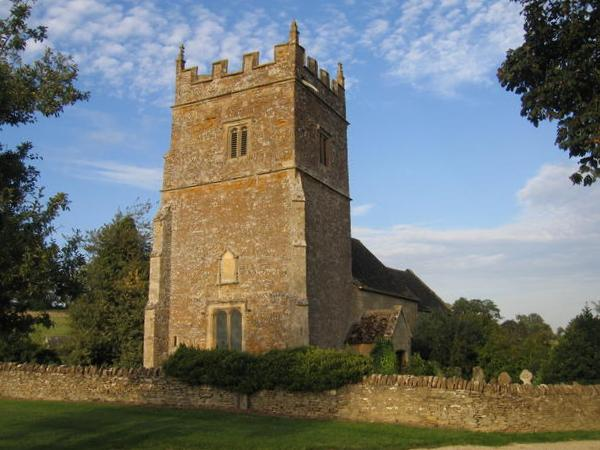
- St Philip's parish church

- Location within Oxfordshire
- OS grid reference: SP293301
- Civil parish: Rollright
- District: West Oxfordshire
- Shire county: Oxfordshire
- Region: South East
- Country: England
- Sovereign state: United Kingdom
- Post town: Chipping Norton
- Postcode district: OX7
- Dialling code: 01608
- Police: Thames Valley
- Fire: Oxfordshire
- Ambulance: South Central
- UK Parliament: Witney
- Website: Rollright Review

Little Rollright is a hamlet in the civil parish of Rollright, in the West Oxfordshire district of Oxfordshire, England. It is about 3 miles (5 km) northwest of Chipping Norton and is the village nearest to the megalithic Rollright Stones.

Little Rollright and neighbouring Great Rollright were historically separate parishes. They were merged into a single civil parish called Rollright in 1932. At the 1931 census (the last before the abolition of the parish), Little Rollright had a population of 10.

== Toponym ==
An early spelling may be seen, its Latin form, as "Parva Rolrandryght" in 1446.

== Parish church ==
The earliest parts of the Church of England parish church of Saint Philip are 13th-century, and include the chancel arch and buttresses. The present south windows of the chancel were inserted in the 15th century. The nave was rebuilt in the 16th century. The tower was built or rebuilt in 1617. The south porch and doorway, and a five-light window on the south side of the nave may be of the same date. Inside the church are two 17th-century monuments to members of the Dixon family. The church is a Grade II* listed building.

St Philip's is part of the ecclesiastical parish of Little Compton, Chastleton, Cornwell, Little Rollright and Salford. The ecclesiastical parish is part of the Chipping Norton benefice, along with the parishes of Chipping Norton with Over Norton, Churchill and Kingham.

== Sources ==
- Sherwood, Jennifer; Pevsner, Nikolaus (1974). Oxfordshire. The Buildings of England. Harmondsworth: Penguin Books. p. 690. ISBN 0-14-071045-0.
