= Rollright =

Coordinates: 51.985°N 1.533°W

- Civil parish
- Location within Oxfordshire
- Civil parish: Rollright
- District: West Oxfordshire
- Shire county: Oxfordshire
- Region: South East
- Country: England
- Sovereign state: United Kingdom
- Post town: Chipping Norton
- Postcode district: OX7
- Dialling code: 01608
- Police: Thames Valley
- Fire: Oxfordshire
- Ambulance: South Central
- UK Parliament: Banbury

Rollright is a civil parish in West Oxfordshire, England. It contains the villages of Great Rollright and Little Rollright and some of the prehistoric Rollright Stones. The parish is on West Oxfordshire's boundary with Cherwell District and Oxfordshire's boundary with Warwickshire.

Richard Coates has proposed that the name Rollright is from the Brittonic phrase *rodland rïx 'wheel enclosure groove', where *rïx 'groove' refers to the gorge near Great Rollright and *rodland 'wheel enclosure' refers to the King's Men circle of the Rollright Stones.
