= Cocks baronets =

Extinct baronetcy in the Baronetage of England

There have been two baronetcies created for persons with the surname Cocks, one in the Baronetage of England and one in the Baronetage of Great Britain. One creation is extant as of 2008.

The Cocks Baronetcy, of Dumbleton in the County of Gloucester, was created in the Baronetage of England on 7 February 1662 for Richard Cocks. The second Baronet sat as Member of Parliament for Gloucestershire. The title became extinct on the death of the fourth Baronet in 1765.

The Cocks, later Somers-Cocks Baronetcy, of Dumbleton in the County of Gloucester, was created in the Baronetage of Great Britain on 7 October 1772. For more information on this creation, see the Baron Somers.

== Cocks baronets, of Dumbleton (1662) ==
The Cocks family of Castleditch, Eastnor, Herefordshire acquired Dumbleton by marriage in the sixteenth century and the manor passed to a junior branch of the family. On the death of the fourth baronet possession of the estate reverted to Charles Cocks, Esq. of Castleditch.

- Sir Richard Cocks, 1st Baronet (c. 1602–1684) was the second son of Richard Cocks of Castleditch. He married Susanna, daughter of Ambrose Elton of Ledbury, Herefordshire and his wife Anne, a daughter of Sir Edward Aston of Tixall, Staffordshire. As a young man he was part of a diplomatic mission to Muscovy, but thereafter lived the life of a country gentleman, serving as a justice of the peace and as high sheriff of Gloucestershire in 1665–6. He was created a baronet in 1666.
- Sir Richard Cocks, 2nd Baronet (c. 1659–1726)
- Sir Robert Cocks, 3rd Baronet (c. 1660–1736) was a younger brother of the second baronet. Educated at Oriel college, Oxford and the Middle Temple, he became a fellow of Brasenose in 1681. Having acquired his doctorate, he became rector of Great Rollright in 1695 and Woodstock in 1715. He married Anne Fulks of Oxford with whom he had 7 sons and 5 daughters. He succeeded his brother as baronet in 1726.
- Sir Robert Cocks, 4th Baronet (died 1765) succeeded his father in 1736, his three elder brothers having died without issue. He married Elizabeth, daughter of James Cholmeley of Easton, Lincolnshire. His wife and 3 children died within a few days of each other 'by a cruel distemper' in 1748, while he died of a fall from his horse.

== Cocks, later Somers-Cocks baronets, of Dumbleton (1772) ==
- see the Baron Somers
