= Richard Cox =

Richard Cox or Coxe may refer to:

- Richard Cox (actor) (born 1948), American actor
- Richard Cox (bishop) (c. 1500–1581), English clergyman, Dean of Westminster and Bishop of Ely
- Richard Cox (1718–1803), founder of Cox & Kings
- Richard Cox (Australian cricketer) (1830–1865), Australian cricketer
- Richard Cox (New Zealand athlete) (born 1951), New Zealand cricket and rugby player
- Richard Cox (horticulturist) (1766–1845), British horticulturist, created Cox's Orange Pippin apple
- Sir Richard Cox, 1st Baronet (1650–1733), Lord Chancellor of Ireland, 1703–1707
- Sir Richard Cox, 2nd Baronet (1702–1766), Irish baronet
- Sir Richard Eyre Cox, 4th Baronet (died 1783), Irish baronet
- Richard Colvin Cox (born 1928), American West Point cadet who disappeared in 1950
- Richard Ian Cox (born 1973), Welsh-Canadian voice actor
- Richard L. Cox (born 1970), American author
- Richard M. Cox (born 1963), English cricket administrator
- Richard Threlkeld Cox (1898–1991), American physicist
- Richard Coxe (priest) (1800–1865), English churchman and author
- Richard Hippisley Coxe (1742–1786), British politician

== See also ==
- Dick Sargent (1930–1994), born Richard Stanford Cox, American actor
- Richard Cocks (disambiguation)
- Dick Cox (Elmer Joseph Cox, 1897–1966), American baseball player
- Cox (surname)
