= Cornwell, Oxfordshire =

Village in Oxfordshire, England

Coordinates: 51.941°N 1.608°W

Cornwell
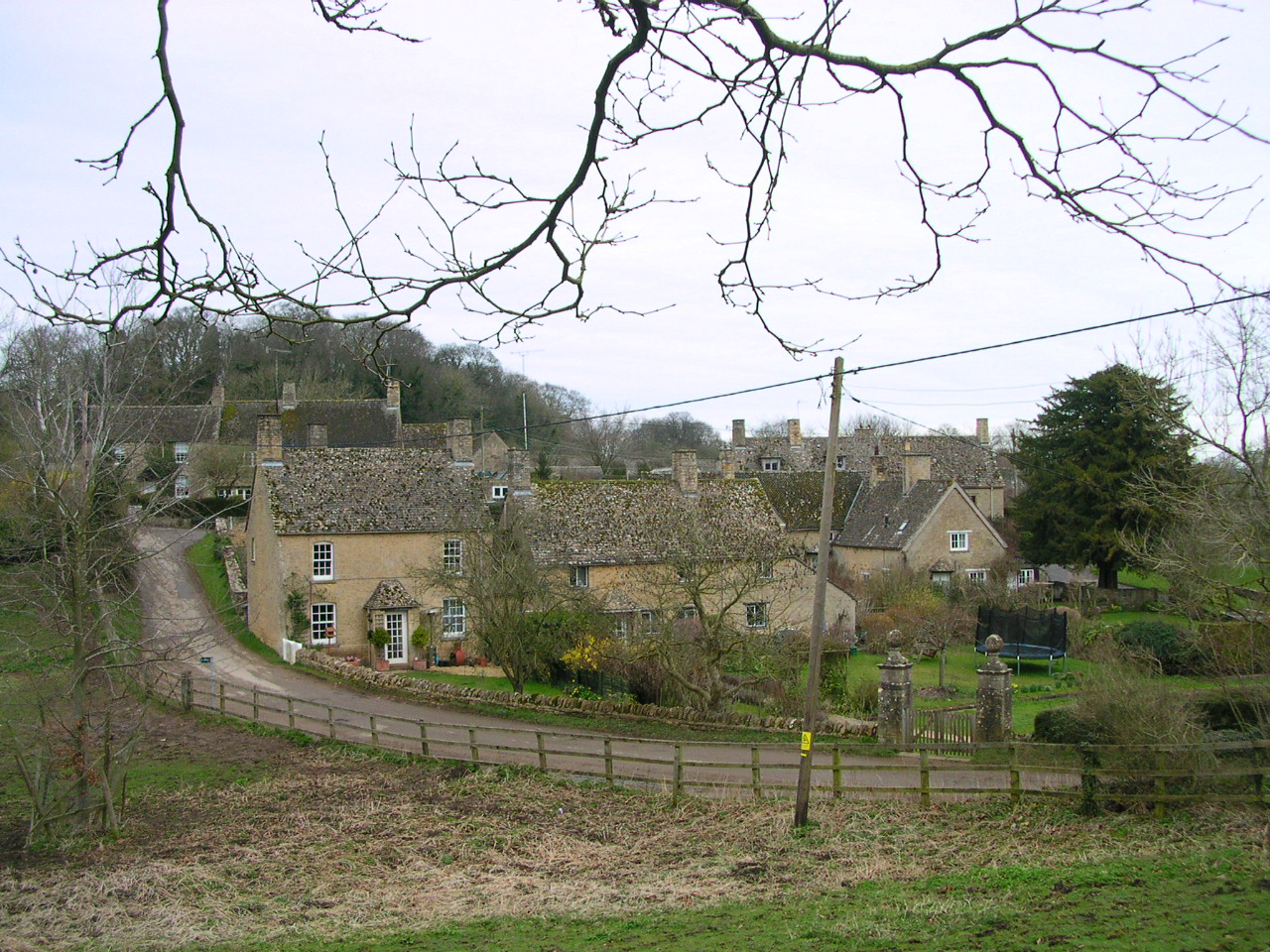
- Cornwell village

- Location within Oxfordshire
- Population: (2001 Census)
- OS grid reference: SP2727
- Civil parish: Cornwell
- District: West Oxfordshire
- Shire county: Oxfordshire
- Region: South East
- Country: England
- Sovereign state: United Kingdom
- Post town: Chipping Norton
- Postcode district: OX7
- Dialling code: 01608
- Police: Thames Valley
- Fire: Oxfordshire
- Ambulance: South Central
- UK Parliament: Banbury

Cornwell is a small village and civil parish about 2.5 miles (4 km) west of Chipping Norton in the West Oxfordshire district of Oxfordshire, near the county border with Gloucestershire. A manor house, Cornwell Manor, dates from the 16th or 17th century.

== History ==
Cornwell was listed in the Domesday Book of 1096 as "Cornewelle" in the ancient hundred of Shipton.

Some of the cottages in the village were built in the 17th century. In 1939 Clough Williams-Ellis remodelled all the cottages in Cornwell and remodelled the former village school in neo-Georgian style as the village hall.

== Description ==
The ancient hamlet of Cornwell is located centrally on Cornwell Estate, comprising 12 cottages.

Cornwell Estate covers 2,000 acres (810 ha) between Chipping Norton, Oxfordshire, and Stow-on-the-Wold, Gloucestershire. A large portion of the estate is under agriculture, farmed in stewardship schemes. There are also areas of wetland, lakes, streams, and woodland.

== Demographics ==
The 2001 Census recorded the parish's population as 66.

== Notable buildings ==
=== Cornwell Manor ===
The manor house, known as Cornwell Manor, dates from the 16th or 17th century, with a dining room and library panelled in about 1640 and 17th century stables and dovecote.

Earlier inhabitants are unknown, but during Henry VIII's reign (1509-1547), the Annesley family took up residence there. Sir Thomas Penyston bought the manor in 1636, and it remained the home of the Penystone family for several generations, until the 19th century. Fairmeadow Penystone enlarged it around 1750, creating its classical southern and eastern facades. The drawing room has a fireplace in the style of Robert Adam.

The house was bought by Joshua Bower in 1923, who sold it 12 years later to Godfrey Anthony Gillson and his American heiress wife, Priscilla. In 1939 they employed the architect Clough Williams-Ellis, who had designed Portmeirion in north Wales, restored the house, added a ballroom and laid out the gardens, including a swimming pool and pavilion at the rear of the house and a terraced garden in the front, creating a formal water garden using local stream water.

In 1941, during World War II, the house was lent to the Auxiliary Territorial Service, for nursing soldiers and for the women volunteers to take rest themselves. Godfrey Gillson died doing war service in 1944, and Priscilla Gillson never actually spent a night in the manor herself. She sold it to Lord Robert Crichton-Stuart, who lived there.

In 1959 the manor was purchased by Peter Alistair Ward, the son of the William Ward, 3rd Earl of Dudley, and his wife Claire. They brought up their daughters, actress and filmmaker Rachel Ward, and environmental campaigner Tracy Louise Ward, in the home, before their divorce around 1970. Peter remarried, had three sons, and continued to live in the manor. His eldest son Alexander inherited the manor; the girls were left out of his will.

The house is a Grade II* listed building.

=== Parish church ===
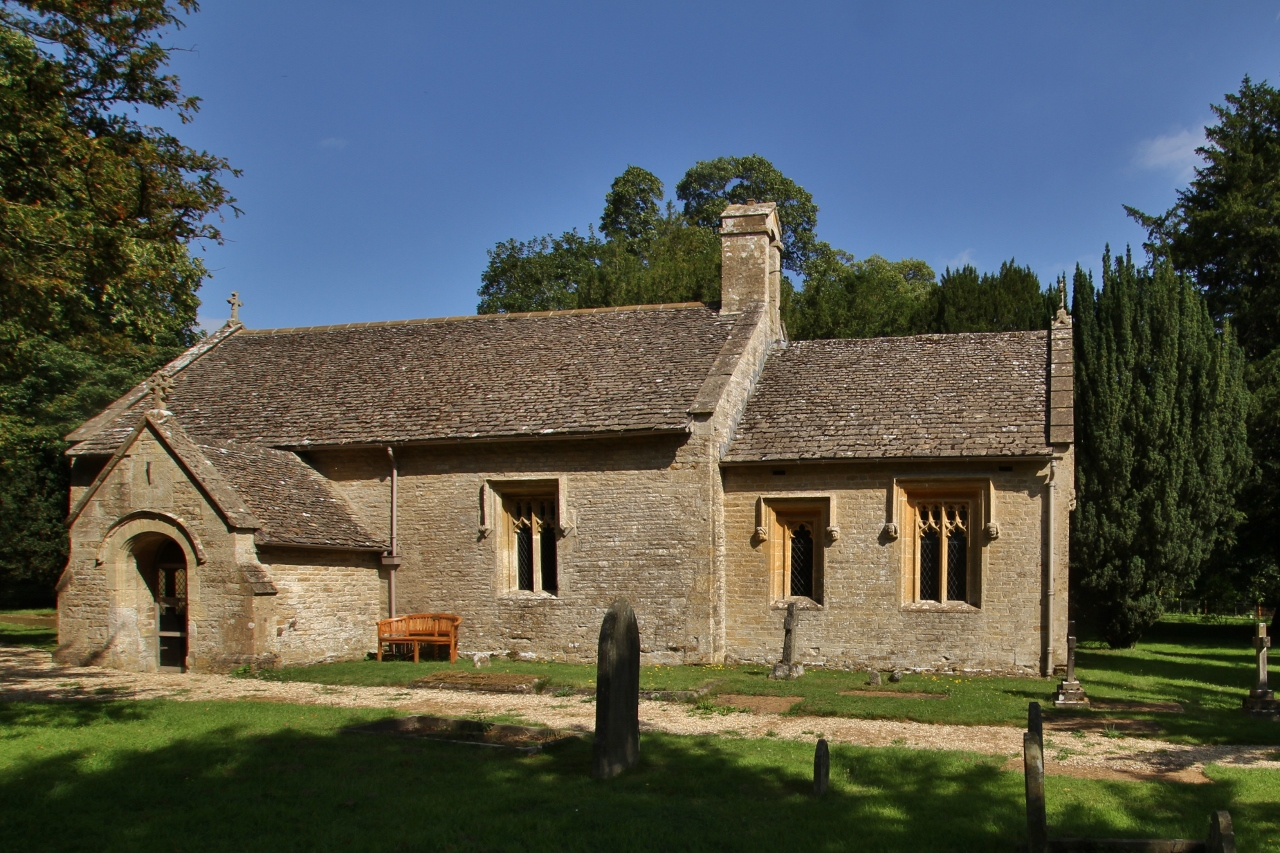
St Peter's parish church, seen from the southeast

The Church of England parish church of Saint Peter was originally Norman, and the chancel arch survives from this time. Most of the windows are Decorated Gothic and Perpendicular Gothic additions. The church was rebuilt in 1830 and 1882, when the present west window was added. The south door has a porch with a sundial. The church is a Grade II* listed building. The church is part of the parish of Little Compton, along with the churches of Chastleton, Daylesford and Little Rollright. The parish is part of the Team Benefice of Chipping Norton, along with the parishes of Chipping Norton with Over Norton, Churchill and Kingham.
