= Chastleton =

Village and civil parish in England

Coordinates: 51.963°N 1.642°W

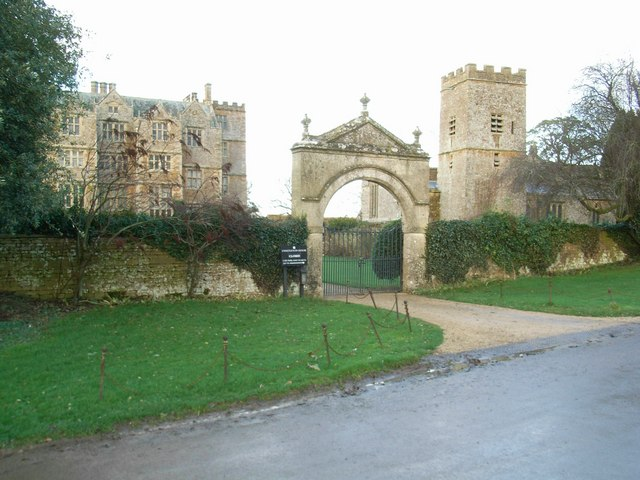
- Chastleton House (left) and St Mary the Virgin parish church (right)

- Location within Oxfordshire
- Population: 153 (2011 Census)
- OS grid reference: SP2429
- Civil parish: Chastleton
- District: West Oxfordshire
- Shire county: Oxfordshire
- Region: South East
- Country: England
- Sovereign state: United Kingdom
- Post town: Moreton-in-Marsh
- Postcode district: GL56
- Dialling code: 01451
- Police: Thames Valley
- Fire: Oxfordshire
- Ambulance: South Central
- UK Parliament: Banbury

Chastleton is a village and civil parish in the Cotswold Hills in Oxfordshire, England, about 4 miles (6.4 km) northeast of Stow-on-the-Wold. Chastleton is in the extreme northwest of Oxfordshire, on the boundaries with both Gloucestershire and Warwickshire. The 2011 Census recorded the parish's population as 153.

== Archaeology ==
Chastleton Barrow or Burrow is an Iron Age hill fort southeast of the village. It is fortified with a single bank built of oolite and earth that encloses an area of about 3.5 acres (1.4 ha). Part of the fort was excavated in about 1881 and sections of the bank and areas near it were excavated in 1928–29. Hearths were found, along with Iron Age pottery and other artefacts that are now held at the Ashmolean Museum in Oxford. These artefacts were used to date the fort as Early Iron Age, which in Britain is about 800 to 400 BC. The fort is now marked by a ring of mature trees.

In the eastern part of the parish are a number of prehistoric sites including a tumulus that still retains a few of the stones that formed its burial chamber. Archaeological examination of the surface at the centre of the tumulus found three flints that showed signs of being worked and two small fragments of human skull. At Lower Brookend Farm in the north of the parish are the remains of a linear fishpond formed by damming a brook. It is either medieval or post-medieval and seems to have been abandoned by about 1800.

== Manor ==
The earliest known record of the manor is from 777, when Offa, King of Mercia, gave land at Chastleton to Eynsham Abbey. The name derives from Old English; the prefix likely from ceastel, signifying a cairn or boundary marker, and the suffix from ton, a town. In the Domesday Book, the manor is recorded as Cestitone, and its landowners as Odo, the Bishop of Bayeux, Henry de Ferrers and Urse d'Abetot. Later, in the Middle Ages, the manor's owners included Robert D'Oyly, the likely builder of Oxford Castle, and Thomas Chaucer, son of Geoffrey.

Next to the parish church is Chastleton House, one of England's finest and most complete Jacobean houses, and a Grade I listed building. Completed in 1612, the house has been occupied by members of the Jones family since 1602. It is now owned by The National Trust who opened the property to the public in 1997 after six years of conservation work. The house is full of objects accumulated by the family over the years: rare tapestries, portraits, furniture, as well as personal belongings, some just lying around, such as walking sticks and Wellington boots. The gardens are typically Elizabethan and Jacobean, with a ring of topiary at their centre. The middle lawn is regarded as the birthplace of croquet and visitors may play there today with equipment provided by the National Trust.

== Parish church ==
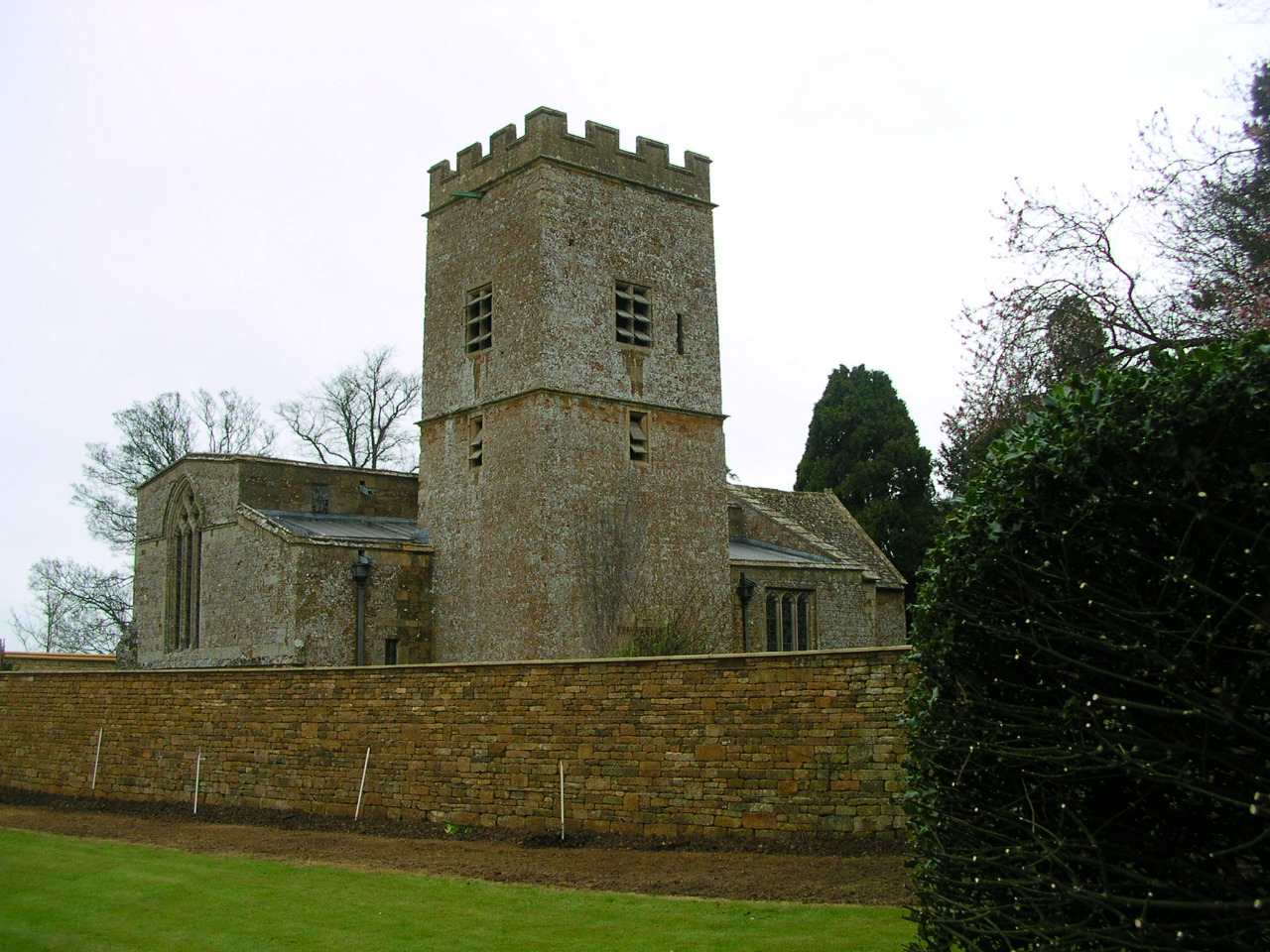
St Mary the Virgin parish church, seen from the southwest

The Church of England parish church of Saint Mary the Virgin was built late in the 12th century, was enlarged and refenestrated in the 14th century. It has a south bell tower that was added in 1689 and has a ring of six bells. The church is a Grade II* listed building.

== Sources ==
- Benson, Don; Fasham, Peter (1972). "Field Work at Chastleton". Oxoniensia. XXXVII. Oxford: Oxford Architectural and Historical Society: 1–9.
- Parry, Charles (1989). "A Survey of a Fishpond at Lower Brookend Farm, Chastleton". Oxoniensia. LIV. Oxford: Oxfordshire Architectural and Historical Society: 405–409.
- Sherwood, Jennifer; Pevsner, Nikolaus (1974). Oxfordshire. The Buildings of England. Harmondsworth: Penguin Books. pp. 531–533. ISBN 0-14-071045-0.
- Sutton, J.E.G. (1966). "Iron Age Hill-Forts and some other Earthworks in Oxfordshire". Oxoniensia. XXXI. Oxford: Oxford Architectural and Historical Society: 35, 36.
