= Alan Clutton-Brock =

British art critic and essayist (1904-1976)

- Born: 8 October 1904; Weybridge, Surrey, England
- Died: 18 December 1976 (aged 72); Chastleton House, Oxfordshire, England
- Education: Eton College; King's College, Cambridge
- Occupations: art critic, essayist
- Notable work: biography of William Blake, detective story Murder at Liberty Hall
- Spouse(s): Shelagh née Archer (died 1936), Barbara Foy Mitchell (m. 1936)
- Children: 1 son, 2 daughters including Juliet Clutton-Brock
- Father: Arthur Clutton-Brock

Alan Francis Clutton-Brock (8 October 1904 – 18 December 1976) was an English art critic and essayist.

Clutton-Brock was born in Weybridge, Surrey, the son of Arthur Clutton-Brock. He was educated at Eton and King's College, Cambridge.

He was art critic of The Times, 1945–1955, a trustee of the National Gallery, and Slade Professor of Fine Art, at Cambridge, 1955–1958. He wrote books of art criticism, a biography of William Blake, and a detective story, Murder at Liberty Hall. During the Second World War he served in the Royal Air Force Volunteer Reserve.

Clutton-Brock was twice married. His first wife, Shelagh, née Archer, with whom he had a daughter (Juliet Clutton-Brock) and a son, died in a road accident in 1936. In the same year he married Barbara Foy Mitchell, with whom he had a daughter. He died at his home, Chastleton House, Oxfordshire, aged 72.
