= Chastleton House =

Historic house museum in Oxfordshire, England

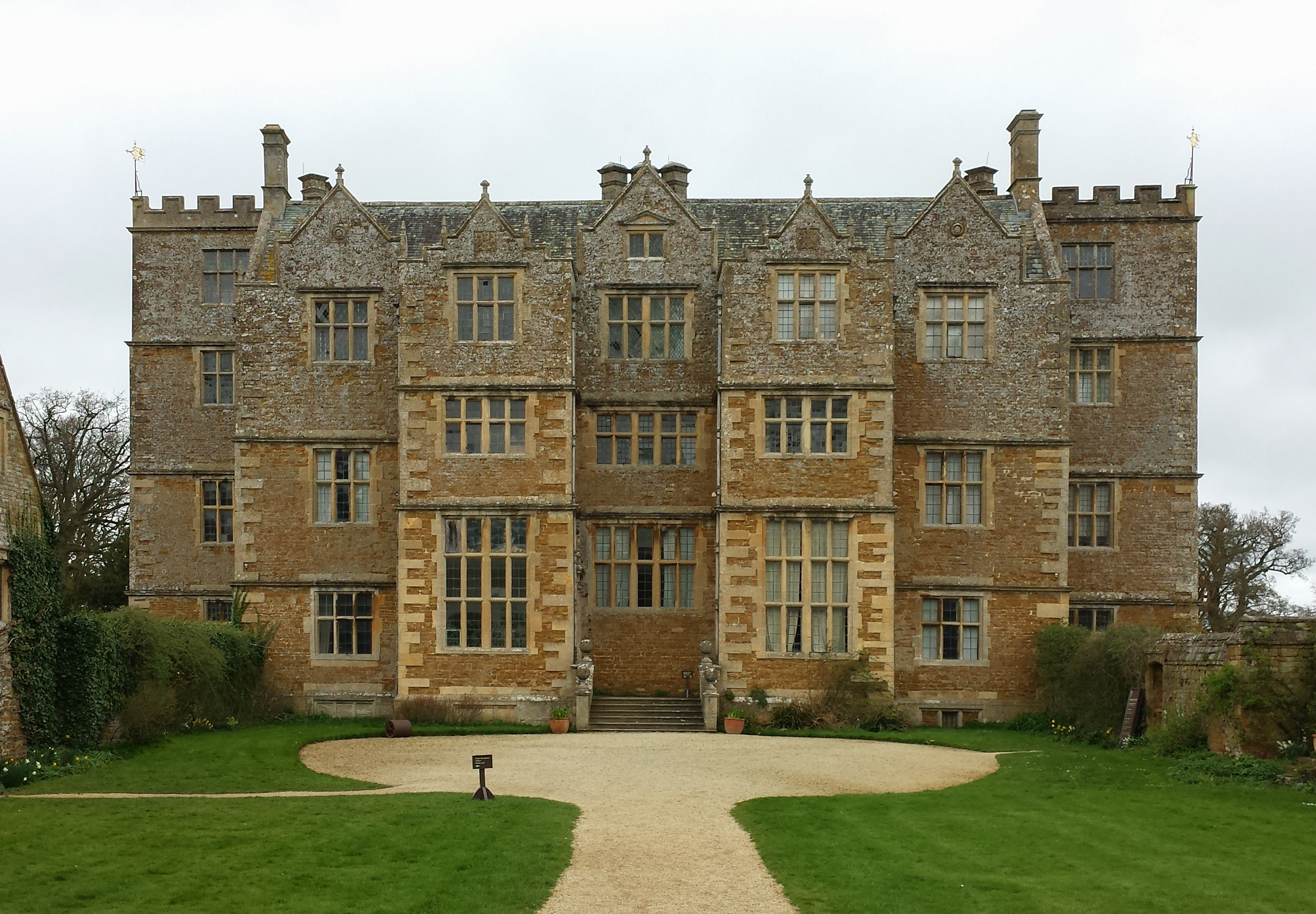
- Front elevation

- Location within Oxfordshire
- 51.9590°N 1.6521°W
- Type: Country house
- Location: Chastleton, Oxfordshire

History
- Built: 1607–12

Site notes
- Architect: attributed to Robert Smythson
- Architectural style: Jacobean
- Owner: National Trust

Listed Building – Grade I
- Official name: Chastleton House
- Designated: 15 December 1954
- Reference no.: 1197988

Chastleton House (/ˈtʃæsəltən/) is a Jacobean country house at Chastleton, Oxfordshire, England, close to Moreton-in-Marsh (grid reference SP2429). It has been owned by the National Trust since 1991 and is a Grade I listed building.

== History ==
Chastleton House was built between 1607 and 1612, possibly by Robert Smythson, for Walter Jones, who had made his fortune from the law, although his family were originally Welsh wool merchants. The estate was bought in 1602 from Robert Catesby, although his residence was demolished to make way for the new house and no traces of the original building on this spot remain. The house is built of Cotswold stone, around a small courtyard, called the Dairy Court.

Chastleton House is famous for an episode from the English Civil War in which a loyal wife duped (and drugged) Roundhead soldiers to save her husband. Sarah Jewell, granddaughter of the art critic Alan Clutton-Brock and his first wife Shelagh Archer, who died in a road accident in 1936, recalled her childhood reenactments of the scene when visiting her grandfather and his second wife Barbara (née Foy-Mitchell), the last owners of the manor (it having passed on the death of Irene Whitmore-Jones in 1955 to Alan Clutton-Brock, her relative by marriage):

"My sisters and I used to love running around searching for the secret room where Arthur Jones, the grandson of Walter Jones, hid after the Battle of Worcester in 1651. Arthur was a Royalist and had been fighting for Charles II but the troops were defeated by Cromwell and Arthur galloped back to Chastleton with Cromwell's soldiers in hot pursuit. His quick-witted wife, Sarah – my childhood heroine – hid him in the secret closet over the porch and although the pursuing soldiers found his exhausted horse in the stables they couldn't find him. Sarah saved Arthur's life by lacing the soldiers' beer with laudanum and saddling up one of their horses for his escape as the soldiers slumbered. My sisters and I used to lie on the bed in the secret room and pretend we could hear the horses galloping towards us. The bed has now gone and the entrance to the room is barred with one of the National Trust's trademarks: a rope."

Mary Whitmore Jones inherited Chastleton in 1874 at the age of 51 after her youngest brother, Wolryche, died in August. She was thus the first female heir of the estate. Mary was a prolific writer and also the designer, between 1875 and 1898, of the Chastleton Patience Board, subsequently manufactured by J. Jaques & Son. In 1900 she handed over the management of the estate to her nephew, Thomas Whitmore Harris, when he changed his surname to Whitmore Jones and married his first cousin Irene Dickins. They lived in Wimbledon, as the House had been let to the Richardson family by Mary, who moved into Chastleton Rectory as a lodger. She died in 1915. Thomas Whitmore Jones died in 1917, passing the whole estate to his widow Irene, who moved back in the 1930s at the end of the tenancy.

== External and internal features ==
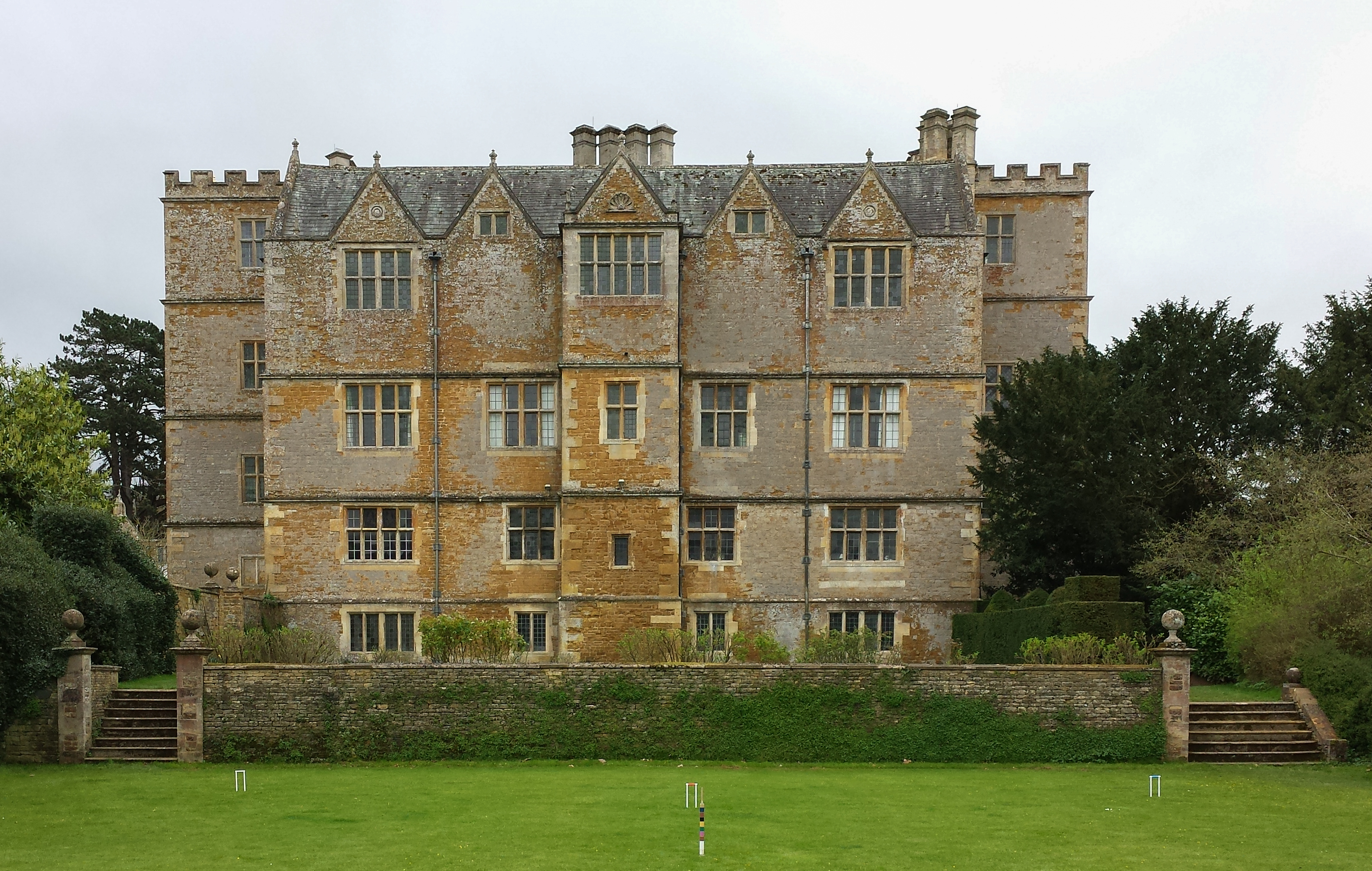
Chastleton House – rear

Chastleton House is different from other houses of its type in several respects. It has never had a park with a long, landscaped approach such as many other houses of its era. Rather it was built within an existing settlement, Chastleton village, which provided many of the services for the house which would otherwise have been attached, such as a laundry, a fishpond and a bakehouse.

Secondly, until its acquisition by the Trust in 1991, it was owned by the same family for nearly 400 years. Its treatment by the Trust was similarly unusual, with a policy of conservation (often called 'controlled decay') rather than restoration, enabling visitors to see the house largely as it was when acquired. As a result of the Trust's approach, a large number of the rooms in the house are open to the public.

Of particular note is the Long Gallery, with its barrel vaulted ceiling, with a length 72 feet (22 m). This is an impressive feature surviving from the period, although the gallery at Montacute House in Somerset is of a similar age and at 172 feet (52 m), is the longest in England. Like much of the house, the Long Gallery ceiling has been subject to damage. The neglect of the roof for almost two centuries led to the failing of part of the plaster ceiling in the early 1800s, but it was not repaired until 1904–1905, when two local men were engaged to make good the losses.

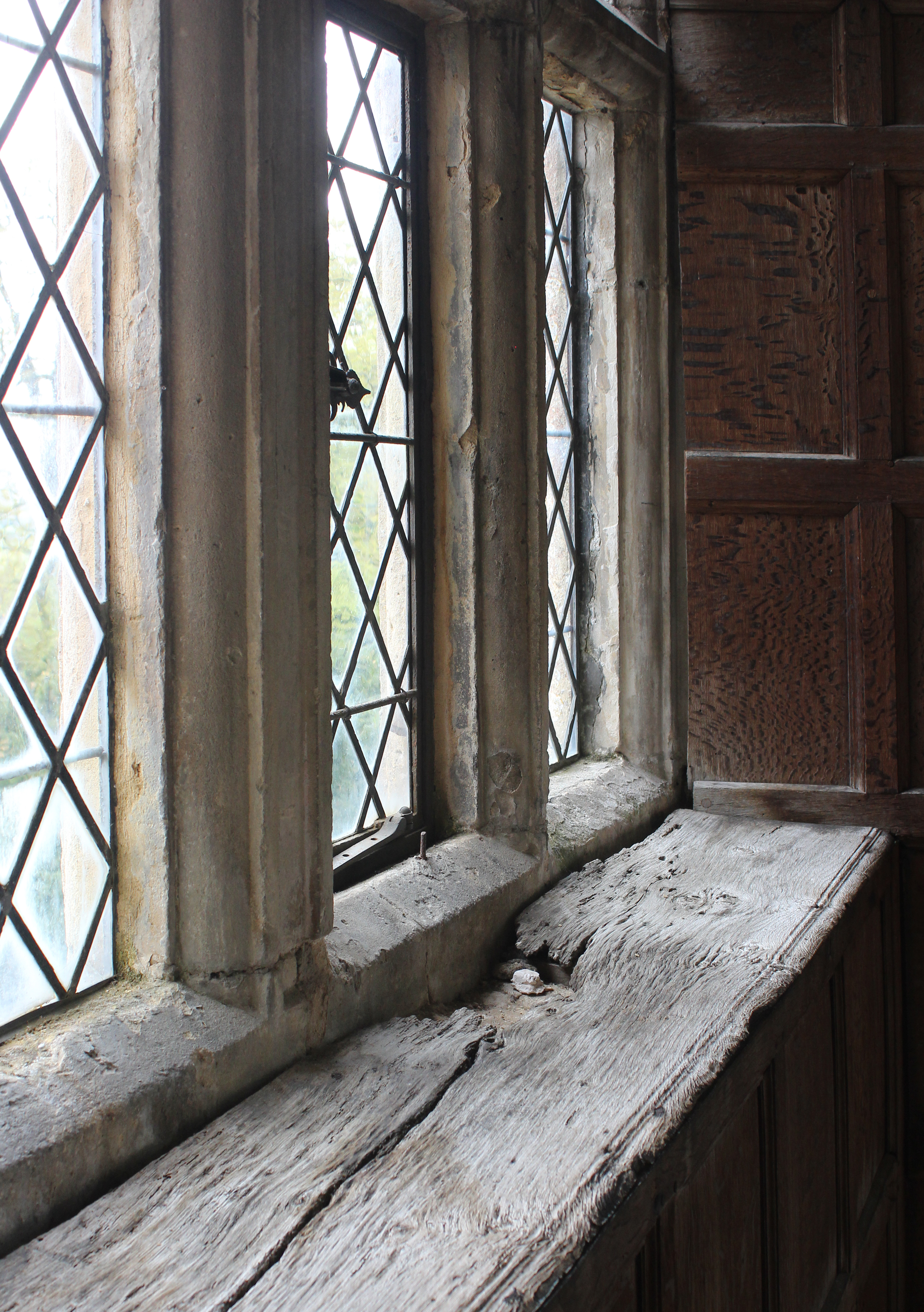
Derelict Jacobean window on top floor

Also of interest is the impressive Great Chamber. Designed for the entertainment of the most important guests and for the playing of music, the design scheme has its roots in Renaissance Italy and is the most impressive in the house. The setting out of the panelling shows some inspiration from the classical, as do the painted roundels around the frieze, depicting the twelve prophets of the Old Testament and the twelve Sibyls or Prophetesses of Antiquity. Also in the Great Chamber are a set of Jacobite Fiat glasses engraved with the Jacobite emblems of roses, oakleaves, and a compass rose, which betray the family's eighteenth-century sympathies. These probably belonged to Henry Jones IV, who was the president of the Gloucestershire Cycle Club, one of the oldest established Jacobite clubs.

Other items of interest in the house include the Juxon Bible, which is said to have been used by the chaplain, William Juxon, at the execution of Charles I. William Juxon had been bishop of London and became archbishop of Canterbury after the Restoration. His family lived locally in Little Compton until they died out in the eighteenth century, when it is thought to have been given to John Jones II because the Jones clan were another family with Jacobite sympathies.

In 1919 a number of significant tapestries were discovered at the house, and were interpreted as evidence for the establishment of a tapestry-weaving venture by William Sheldon (d. 1570) at Barcheston in Warwickshire, although modern research questions this. One of these tapestries is currently on display in the Middle Chamber, and another is in the permanent collection of the Victoria and Albert Museum in London.

== Chastleton Garden ==
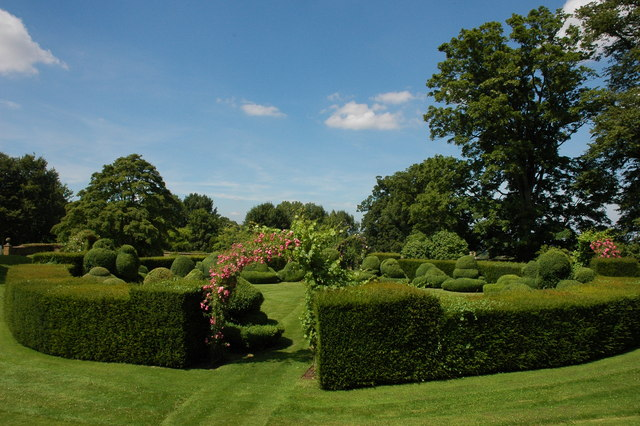
Gardens at Chastleton

The Grade II listed garden at Chastleton has undergone a number of revisions since the completion of the house in 1612. There is no archaeological evidence of a garden on this site before this date: indeed, the North Garden is split by an old field boundary.

There is no map or written evidence to suggest how the garden was laid out by Walter Jones in 1612, but the walls that enclose the garden are 17th-century, and archaeological evidence that suggests that the garden has been laid out the same way for the last 400 years. It is laid out according to the recommendation proposed by Gervase Markham in his book The English Husbandman (1613) – a forecourt to the front of the house, with the base (or bass) court on one side, which included the stables and other farm buildings. The other two sides of the house should be composed of gardens, divided into an orchard, a kitchen garden and a best (or pleasure) garden, planted with more ornamental plants.

At the time, the forecourt at Chastleton described the entrance area below the House court (the area directly in front of the house). The House court was raised slightly above the forecourt by a small retaining wall, probably with a balustrade on top. There were likely to be few plants in the front of the house in the early 17th century, with the House Court possibly being paved or having two grass plats on each side of the central path like the forecourt.

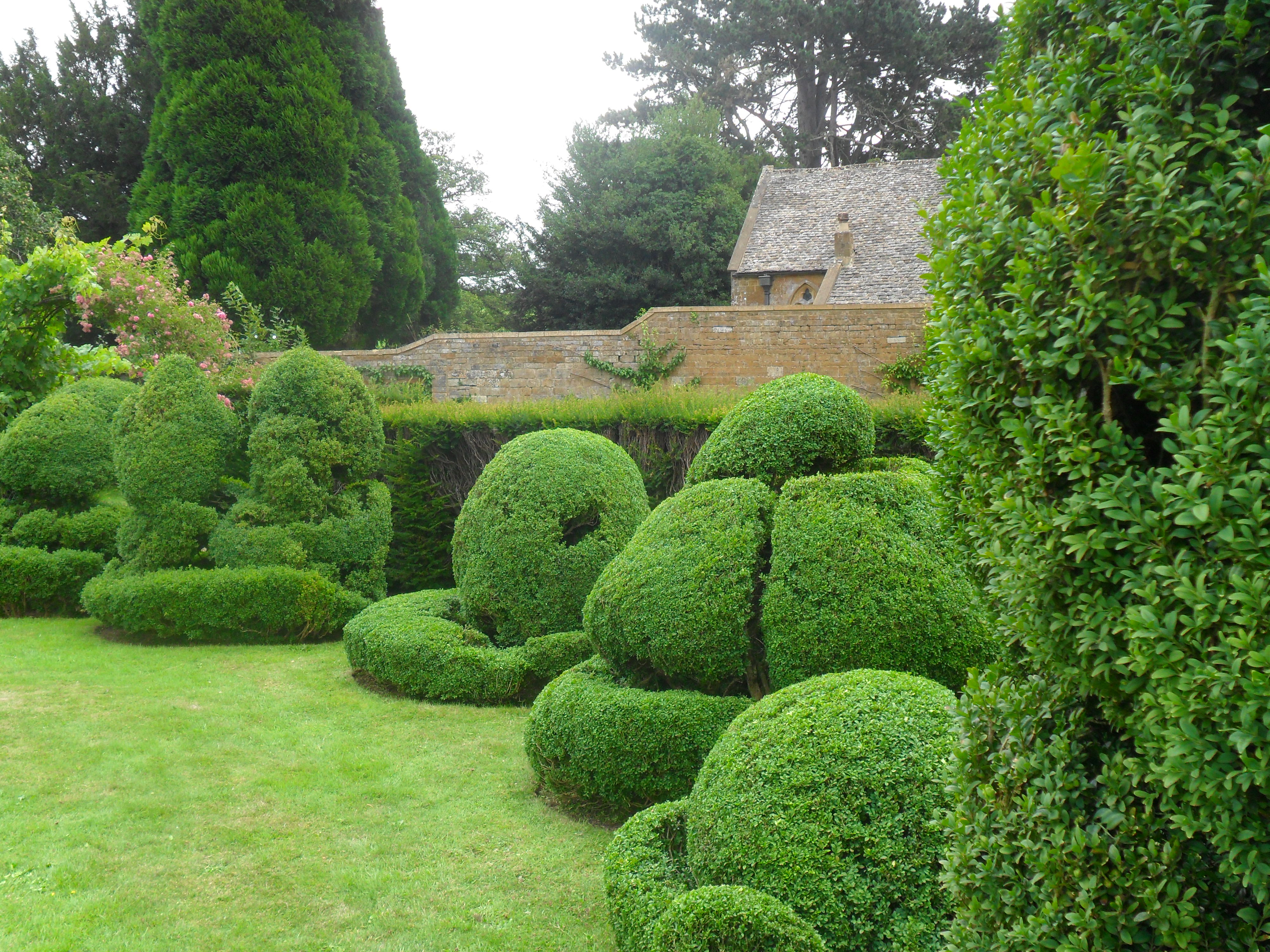
Gardens at Chastleton

To the east of this was the Pleasaunce or Pleasure Garden. This was the Best Garden, which was levelled, but with a viewing terrace along one side which also gave entrance to the church at the opposite end. The design of this garden is not known, but it was almost certainly surrounded by high walls with fruit trees trained against it. The Best Garden was laid out in the circular pattern we see today by Dorothy Whitmore Jones in 1833, although it is suggested that there were already box plants there. Beds were added within the circular hedge in the 1890s or 1900s and then grassed over again by 1972. During the periods of time when money came into the family the planting in this garden was always renewed.

=== Birthplace of croquet ===
To the north are terraces, levelled from the sloping ground. There is evidence of a medieval cultivation terrace and the remnants of the old boundary wall of the garden. There was a Bowling Green on the Middle terrace and the third terrace may also have been the site of the original kitchen garden.

Today, the middle terraces are the site of two croquet lawns, originally laid out by Walter Whitmore-Jones in the 1860s. His version of the rules of croquet published in The Field in 1865 became definitive, and Chastleton is considered the birthplace of croquet as a competitive sport. Equipment is provided by the National Trust and in the summer visitors may play a game of croquet if they wish.

The Kitchen Garden as it is now was enclosed in 1847 and was formed of the existent garden and from part of the adjoining field. It was laid out as four plots on one side of a broad path and two on the other side, and the kitchen garden today has been recently rejuvenated to form this pattern as well.

== Film location ==
Chastleton House was used as one of the locations for the 2015 BBC Two television series Wolf Hall and represented 'Wolf Hall,' home of the Seymours. It also featured as Boot Magna Hall in the 1987 ITV film of Evelyn Waugh’s novel 'Scoop'.
