= Sir Richard Cocks, 2nd Baronet =

English politician

Sir Richard Cocks, 2nd baronet (c.1659-1726), of Dumbleton, Gloucestershire, was an English politician.

He was the son of Richard Cocks, eldest son of Sir Richard Cocks, 1st baronet of Dumbleton and Mary, daughter of Sir Robert Cooke of Highnam. He inherited the baronetcy from his grandfather in 1684. He was a member of the Parliament of England for Gloucestershire 1698 - 1702, his parliamentary career being well-documented by his surviving memoranda books.

He married:

1. Frances (d. 1724), daughter of Colonel Richard Neville of Billingbear, Berkshire, who according to her funeral monument 'was eminently pious and zealous for the established Government and Religion'.
1. Mary (d. 1764), daughter of William Bethell of Swinden, Yorks.

Dying childless, he was succeeded by his younger brother.

Baronetage of England
Preceded by Richard Cocks	Baronet (of Dumbleton); 1684–1726	Succeeded by Robert Cocks
