= Mary Whitmore Jones =

English author (c. 1823–1915)

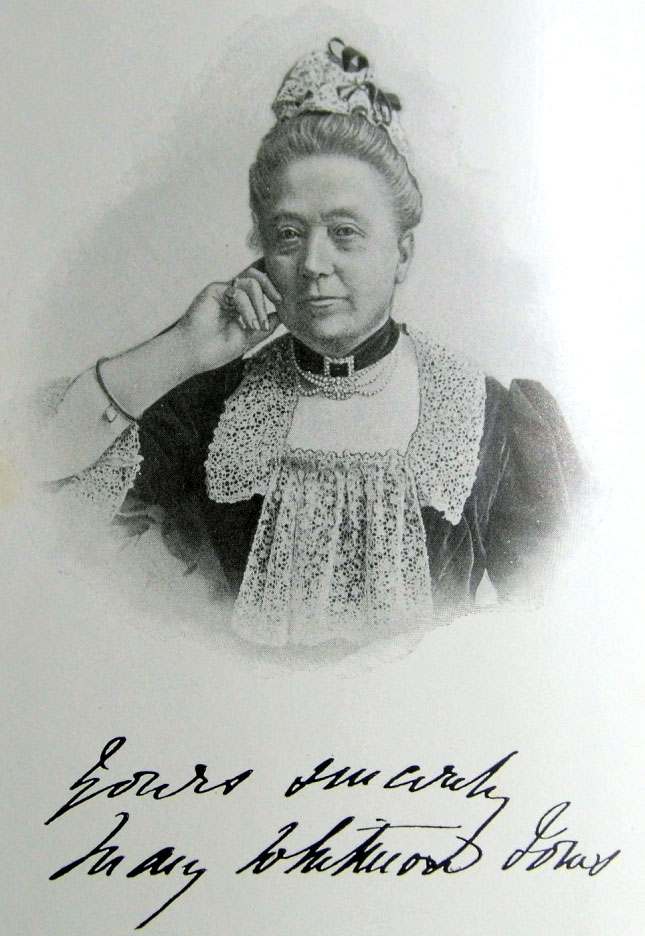
- Born: c. 1823
- Died: 1915
- Occupation: Author

Mary Elizabeth Whitmore Jones (c. 1823 – 1915) was an English author and the first female heir of Chastleton House. She was unmarried and did not have any children. It has been said that other, notable, 19th century authors of patience games "pale into insignificance" when compared with her.

== Life ==
Mary Whitmore Jones was born around 1823 and was the eldest daughter of John Henry Whitmore, who adopted the name Jones when in 1828 he inherited the Chastleton estate originally developed by Walter Jones, a lawyer and Member of Parliament for Worcester. The son of a wealthy wool merchant, Walter Jones had built the family's country house, Chastleton House, between 1607 and 1612. Mary became a prolific and varied writer. She inherited Chastleton in 1874 at the age of 51 when her last surviving brother, Willie, died. She was thus the first female heir of the estate. After a few years, she handed over the management of the estate to her nephew, Thomas Whitmore Harris, insisting he change his name to Whitmore Jones. The house was soon let to wealthy tenants, while Mary moved into Chastleton Rectory, where her niece lived with her husband, the Rector. She died in 1915.

== Works ==
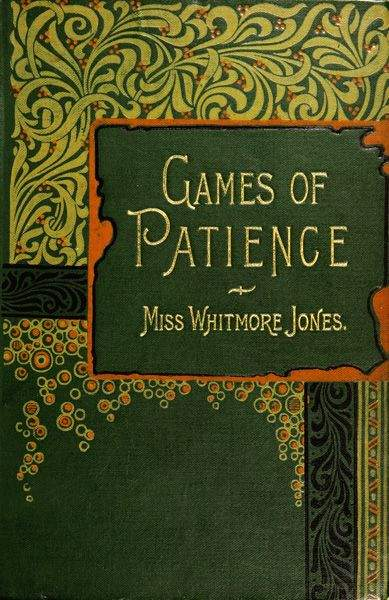
Cover of Games of Patience for One or More Players, first series (1888)

Whitmore Jones was a prolific author, not least in the field of patience games; other, notable, 19th century authors on the subject were said to "pale into insignificance when compared with the Patience guru of the age – the incomparable Miss Mary Whitmore Jones." Her first series of Games of Patience for One or More Players was published in 1888 and she produced "at least eight substantial books on the subject" as well as publishing collections. She was also the author of several novels, biographies and history books. A selection of her works follows:

- Games of Patience for One or More Players, 1st series (1888).
- Games of Patience for One or More Players, 2nd series (1890).
- Games of Patience for One or More Players, 3rd series (1892).
- Games of Patience for One or More Players, 4th series (1898).
- Games of Patience for One or More Players, 5th series (1900).
- The Grinding Mills (1903).
- New Games of Patience, 1st edn. (1905).
- Time and Tide (1907).
- The ABC of Patience (1908).
- The Gunpowder Plot (1909).
- New Games of Patience, 2nd edn. (1911).
- Chastleton House.
- Siege of Derry.

== Chastleton Patience Board ==
Mary Whitmore Jones was also the inventor of the Chastleton Patience Board which she designed between 1875 and 1898 and subsequently had manufactured by J. Jaques & Son. Each one was personally signed by her.
