= Great Rollright =

Village in Oxfordshire, England

Coordinates: 51.986°N 1.532°W

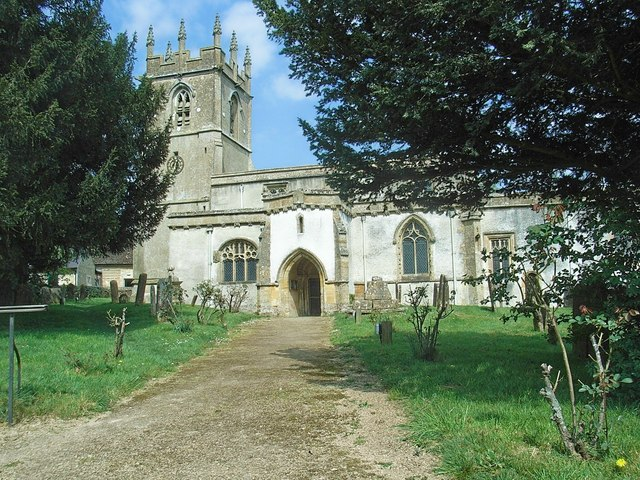
- St Andrew's parish church

- Location within Oxfordshire
- OS grid reference: SP3231
- Civil parish: Rollright
- District: West Oxfordshire
- Shire county: Oxfordshire
- Region: South East
- Country: England
- Sovereign state: United Kingdom
- Post town: Chipping Norton
- Postcode district: OX7
- Dialling code: 01608
- Police: Thames Valley
- Fire: Oxfordshire
- Ambulance: South Central
- UK Parliament: Witney
- Website: "Rollright Review"

Great Rollright is a village in the civil parish of Rollright, in the West Oxfordshire district of Oxfordshire, England. It is about 2.5 miles (4 km) north of Chipping Norton.

The village has a Church of England primary school.

== History ==
The former Banbury and Cheltenham Direct Railway, part of the Great Western Railway, was completed in 1881. The line had a small railway station, Rollright Halt, 1/2 mile (800 m) south of Great Rollright. British Railways closed the halt in 1951 and the railway in 1964.

The village's former pub, The Unicorn Inn, was controlled by Hunt Edmunds Brewery of Banbury until the company was taken over in the 1960s; it ceased trading in the late 1980s.

On 23 December 1944, a United States Army Air Force, Boeing B-17 Flying Fortress (43-38812) was on a flight from RAF Portreath to RAF Glatton. The aircraft crashed while descending in darkness and fog 2 miles North of Great Rollright, killing 8 of the 9 crew.

Great Rollright and neighbouring Little Rollright were historically separate parishes. They were merged into a single civil parish called Rollright in 1932. At the 1931 census (the last before the abolition of the parish), Great Rollright had a population of 289.

== Landmarks ==
The megalithic Rollright Stones are about 1.5 miles (2.4 km) west of Great Rollright, near the Warwickshire village of Long Compton.

The Church of England parish church of Saint Andrew has Norman, Early English, Decorated Gothic and Perpendicular Gothic features. St Andrew's was restored in 1852 under the direction of the Oxford Diocesan Architect, GE Street. St Andrew's is a Grade I listed building. The west tower has a ring of six bells. William Bagley of Chacombe, Northamptonshire cast the fourth, fifth and tenor bells in 1695 and the third bell in 1696. W&J Taylor cast the second bell in 1839, presumably at the foundry they then had at Oxford. Henry I Bond and Sons of Burford cast the treble bell in 1899. St Andrew's parish is now part of the Benefice of Hook Norton with Great Rollright, Swerford and Wigginton.

== Sources ==
- Sherwood, Jennifer; Pevsner, Nikolaus (1974). Oxfordshire. The Buildings of England. Harmondsworth: Penguin Books. pp. 624–625. ISBN 0-14-071045-0.
