= Rollright Stones =

Neolithic stone complex in Oxfordshire, England

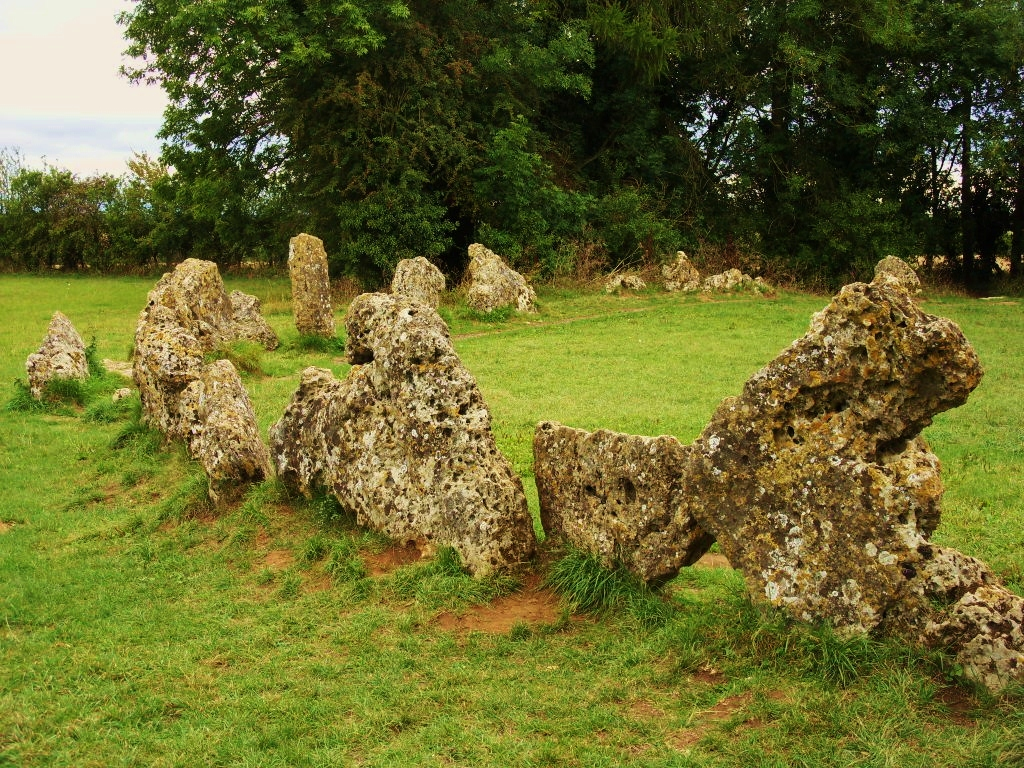
- Part of the King's Men stone circle, one of three monuments at the site

- Location within Oxfordshire
- 51°58′32″N 1°34′15″W
- Type: Dolmen, Stone circle and monolith
- Location: Oxfordshire

Scheduled monument
- Official name: The Rollright Stones
- Designated: 18 August 1882
- Reference no.: 1018400

The Rollright Stones are a complex of three Neolithic and Bronze Age megalithic monuments near the village of Long Compton, on the borders of Oxfordshire and Warwickshire. Constructed from local oolitic limestone, the three monuments, now known as the King's Men and the Whispering Knights in Oxfordshire and the King Stone in Warwickshire, are distinct in their design and purpose. They were built at different periods in late prehistory. During the period when the three monuments were erected, there was a continuous tradition of ritual behaviour on sacred ground, from the 4th to the 2nd millennium BCE.

The first to be constructed was the Whispering Knights, a dolmen that dates to the Early or Middle Neolithic period. It was likely to have been used as a place of burial. This was followed by the King's Men, a stone circle that was constructed in the Late Neolithic or Early Bronze Age; unusually, it has parallels to other circles located further north, in the Lake District, implying a trade-based or ritual connection. The third monument, the King Stone, is a single monolith. Although its construction has not been dated, the dominant theory amongst archaeologists is that it was a Bronze Age grave marker.

The British philologist Richard Coates has proposed that the name "Rollright" is from the Brittonic phrase *rodland rïx 'wheel enclosure groove', where *rïx 'groove' refers to a narrow valley near Great Rollright and *rodland 'wheel enclosure' refers to the King's Men circle. By the early modern period, folkloric stories had developed about the Stones, telling of how they had once been a king and his knights who had been turned to stone by a witch. Such stories continued to be taught amongst local people well into the 19th century. Meanwhile, antiquarians such as William Camden, John Aubrey and William Stukeley had begun to take an interest in the monuments. Fuller archaeological investigations were undertaken in the 20th century, culminating in excavations run by George Lambrick in the 1980s. The site is listed by Historic England as a scheduled monument and was first designated in 1882.

In the 20th century, the stones became an important site for adherents of various forms of Contemporary Paganism, as well as for other esotericists, who hold magico-religious ceremonies there. They also began to be referred to more widely in popular culture, being featured in television, literature, music and art.

== Location ==
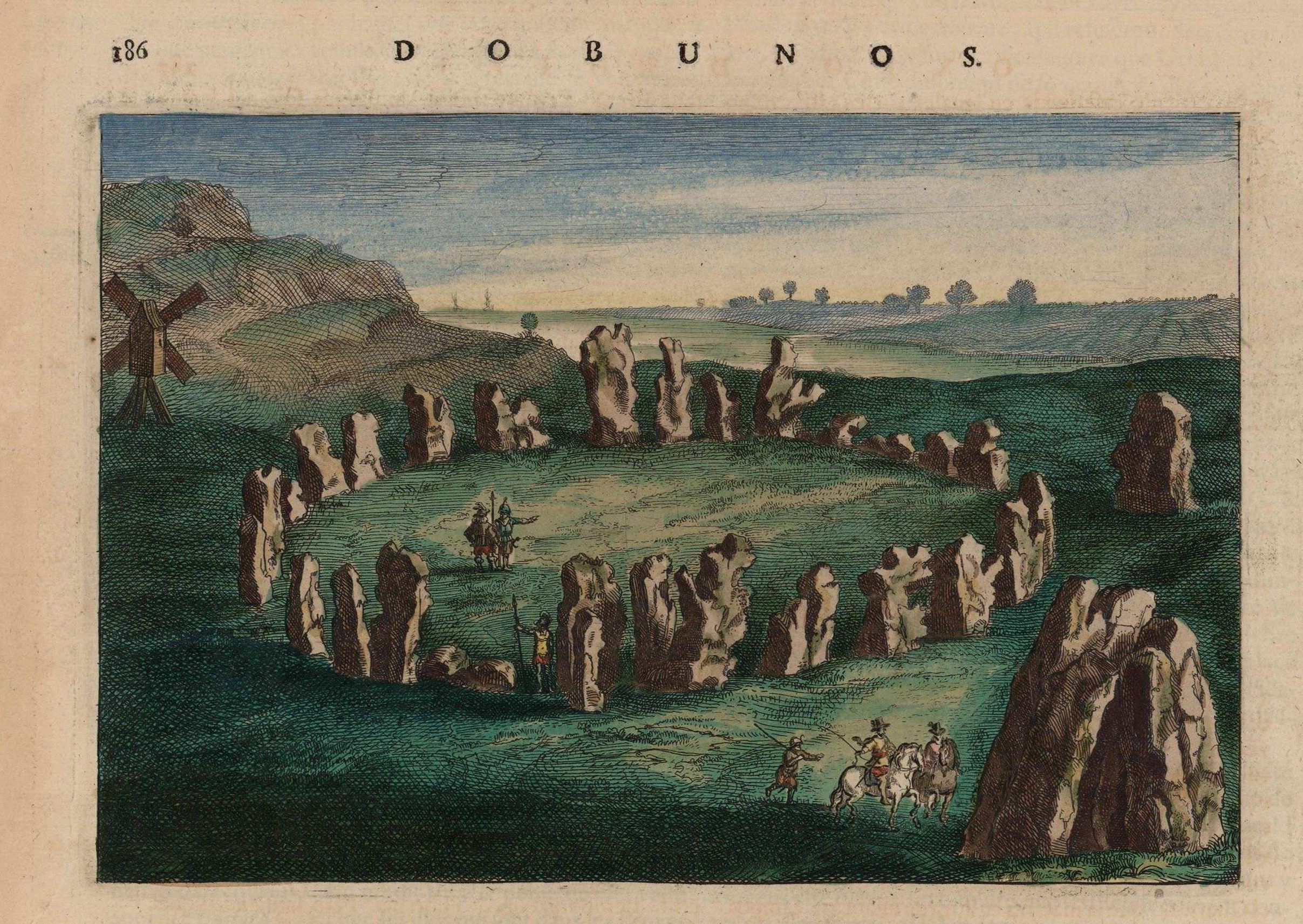
The Rollright Stones in 1645, with the King's Men in the middle, the Whispering Knights at the bottom right, and the King Stone at the middle right

The Rollright Stones are on the contemporary border between the counties of Oxfordshire and Warwickshire, 2.5 miles (4 km) north-northwest of the town of Chipping Norton, and 1.75 miles (3 km) west of the smaller village at Great Rollright. The monuments are on the scarp of the Cotswold Hills, just as the scarp forms a ridge between the Stour valley to the north and the Swere valley to the south. Geologically, this ridge had been formed from Chipping Norton limestone, itself a variant of the Great Oolite series of Jurassic limestone.

== Background ==
=== Early Neolithic Britain ===
In the 4th millennium BCE, around the start of the Neolithic period in Britain, British society underwent radical changes. These coincided with the introduction to the island of domesticated species of animals and plants, as well as a changing material culture that included pottery. These developments allowed hunter-gatherers to settle down and produce their own food. As agriculture spread, people cleared land. At the same time, they also erected the first monuments to be seen in the local landscape. Such activity has been interpreted as evidence of a change in the way people viewed their place in the world.

During the Early and the Middle Neolithic large megalithic tombs were constructed across the British Isles. Because they housed the bodies of the dead, archeologists have typically believed these tombs to indicate rituals around death and ancestor veneration by those who constructed them. Such Neolithic tombs are common across much of western Europe, from Iberia to Scandinavia. The practice was likely brought to the British Isles along with, or roughly concurrent to, the introduction of farming. A widely held theory amongst archaeologists is that these megalithic tombs were intentionally made to resemble the long timber houses which had been constructed by Neolithic farming peoples in the Danube basin from circa 4800 BCE.

As the historian Ronald Hutton related:

There is no doubt that these great tombs, far more impressive than would be required of mere repositories for bones, were the centres of ritual activity in the early Neolithic: they were shrines as well as mausoleums. For some reason, the success of farming and the veneration of ancestral and more recent bones had become bound up together in the minds of the people.

=== Late Neolithic Britain ===
"After over a thousand years of early farming, a way of life based on ancestral tombs, forest clearance and settlement expansion came to an end. This was a time of important social changes."

— Archaeologist and prehistorian Mike Parker Pearson on the Late Neolithic in Britain (2005)

During the Late Neolithic, British society underwent a series of major changes. Between 3500 and 3300 BCE, these prehistoric Britons ceased their continual expansion and cultivation of wilderness. Instead they settled and farmed the most agriculturally productive areas of the island: Orkney, eastern Scotland, Anglesey, the upper Thames, Wessex, Essex, Yorkshire and the river valleys of The Wash.

Late Neolithic Britons also appeared to have changed their religious beliefs, ceasing to construct the large chambered tombs that archeologists widely think were connected with ancestor veneration. Instead, they began the construction of large wooden or stone circles, with many hundreds being built across Britain and Ireland over a period of a thousand years.

== Construction ==
The Rollright Stones are three separate megalithic monuments, constructed close to one another during the later prehistoric ages of the Neolithic and Bronze Age. Their current names – the King's Men, the King Stone, and the Whispering Knights – descend from folklore that has surrounded the site since the early modern period. These local terms have since been adopted by archaeologists and heritage managers.

Fragments of stone used in the construction of the monument underwent a petrological examination at the British Museum in London, where it was established that they were a form of oolithic limestone that was local to the area around the Rollrights. Archaeologist George Lambrick argued that the stones had been discovered by prehistoric peoples as naturally occurring surface boulders, rather than having been quarried. He noted they had certain weathering patterns which were consistent with those found on surface boulders. He said that the most likely place that such surface boulders would have been found in the late prehistoric was "on the sides of the ridge at or near the level of the strong spring line between the Inferior Oolithic and the Lias clay." If this had been the place where the megalith builders had found the boulders, the huge stones would have had to be transported up hill. The gradient averages about 1 in 15 on the shortest routes, for either 250 metres (for the Whispering Knights), or 450 metres (for the King Stone and King's Men).

Basing his ideas upon experimental archaeological investigations performed at Stonehenge, Lambrick suggested that the prehistoric workers who hauled the stones uphill would have made use of wooden sledges. They may have used timber rollers beneath the sledges, in order to reduce the manpower needed to drag the sledge. Lambrick calculated the estimated work force and labour that would have been required to produce the Rollright Stone monuments. In comparison to that required for many other monuments, he concluded that the time and labour investment would have been "trivial", and would not have stretched local resources in terms of manpower.

=== The Whispering Knights ===
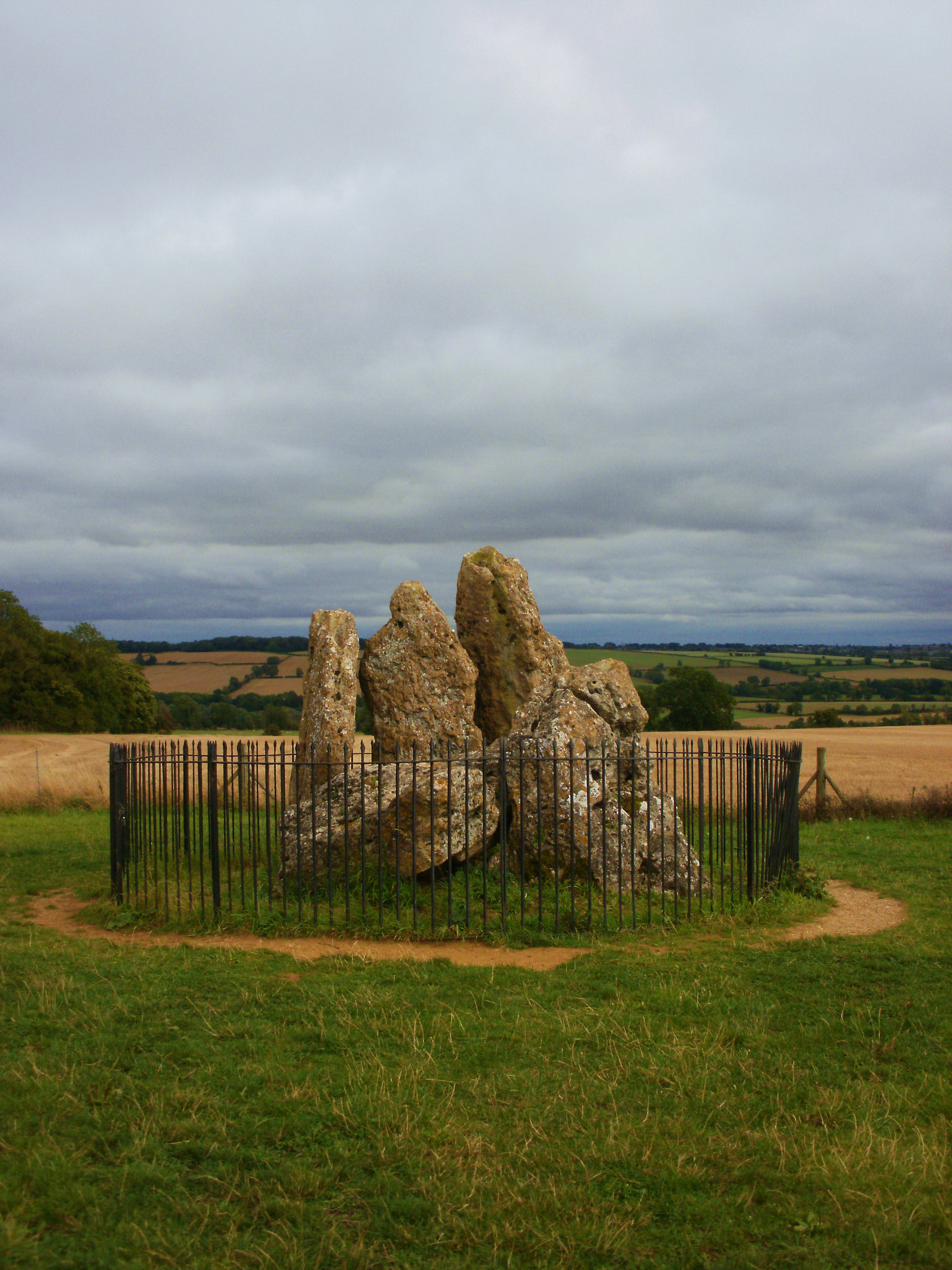
The Whispering Knights, 2011.

Believed to be the earliest of the Rollright Stones, the Whispering Knights are the remains of the burial chamber of an Early or Middle Neolithic portal dolmen, lying 400 metres east of the King's Men. Four standing stones survive, forming a chamber about two square metres in area around a fifth recumbent stone, probably the collapsed roof capstone. Although archaeologists and antiquarians had been speculating and debating the nature of the Whispering Knights for centuries, more about the monument was revealed only following the excavations carried out around the stones by George Lambrick and his team during the 1980s. They found that the portal dolmen had never been a part of a longer cairn, as had been suggested by some earlier investigators. In addition, they uncovered a few pieces of Neolithic pottery around the monument.

Writing in 1743, the antiquarian William Stukeley described the Whispering Knights as sitting upon a round barrow, something which Lambrick accepted as being "reasonable in the context of a portal dolmen". But, he cautioned against accepting such an explanation too readily. He suggested that a "mound-like effect" could have been created at the base of the monument if ploughing in later centuries had led to the accumulation of soil around the dolmen's uphill side and the removal of it on the downhill side. Excavation failed to provide evidence to prove either suggestion, leaving the issue "ambiguous". Lambrick noted there was a possibility that some of the stratigraphic layers "may represent the base of some sort of cairn" around the Whispering Knights.

Lambrick believed that raising the capstone on the Whispering Knights would have been the hardest task of the Rollrights' construction. He said it was "analogous" to the raising of the lintels on Stonehenge. He suggested that the builders had constructed a ramp out of "collected stones", which was "placed against the back of the chamber". The capstone was then "hauled up on rollers, probably running on logs embedded longitudinally in the ramp", in order to get it into position.

=== The King's Men ===
The King's Men is a stone circle 33 metres (108 ft) in diameter, currently composed of seventy-seven closely spaced stones. It was constructed during the Late Neolithic or Early Bronze Age.

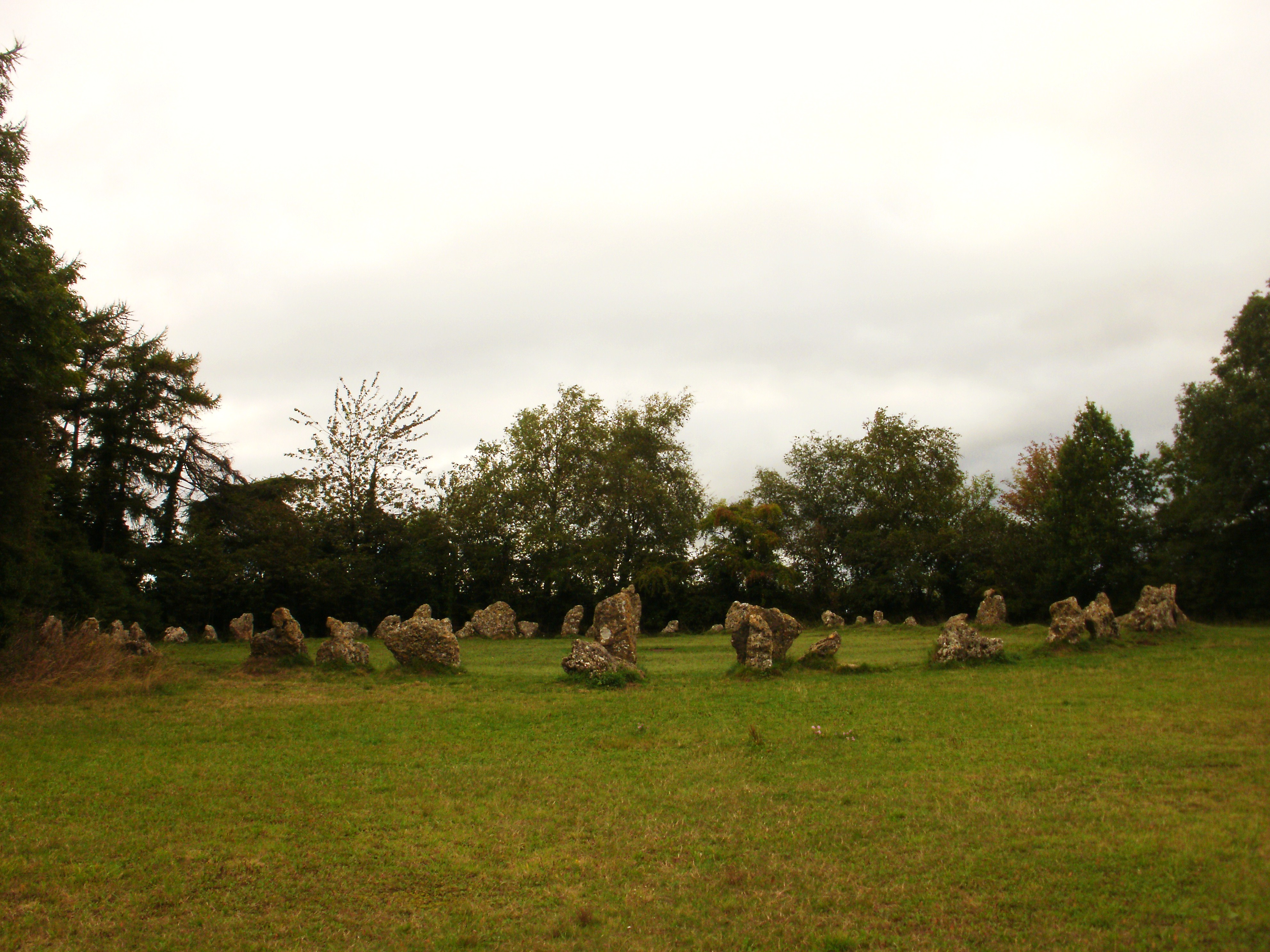
The King's Men circle in 2011

After undertaking limited excavation at the circle in the 1980s, Lambrick concluded that when it had been originally erected, it would have been a "more perfect circle" than it is today. He thought that each of the stones would have touched one another, creating a continuous barrier all the way around. He also speculated that the monument's builders intentionally placed the smoother sides of the boulders to face inwards. The outer facing sides are predominantly rougher in texture.

Resistivity and magnetometry surveys undertaken during the 1980s revealed four magnetic anomalies within the centre of the circle, possibly representing "pits related in some way to local ground surface undulations and the presence of localised burning." Lambrick noted that similar features could be found within the stone circles of Mayburgh, Stenness and Balbirnie. He said that it was a possible original prehistoric feature, although accepted it may equally have been the result of refuse deposited in the Romano-British period, or tree-planting holes.

However, the key comparable site to the King's Men is Swinside - which features an almost identical layout. Its 4-poster entrance - where two outward stones are found outside the circle, forming a portal outwards - is only found elsewhere at Swinside, as well as the larger Long Meg and Her Daughters. Both of these sites are found in the Northwest English county of Cumbria, which is known to have ties to the Brú na Bóinne Passage Tombs. First identified by Aubrey Burl, the "Cumbrian circle" is a typology of large, megalithic enclosures found primarily in northwest England and southwest Scotland, characterised by numerous stones, open interiors, and well-defined entrances. These monuments were constructed between roughly 3200 and 2500 BC and are historically associated with the Neolithic exchange networks of the Group VI Langdale axe trade. While once considered a distinct precursor to henges, they are now viewed as regional expressions of a shared architectural tradition that often evolved through centuries of modification and ritual use.

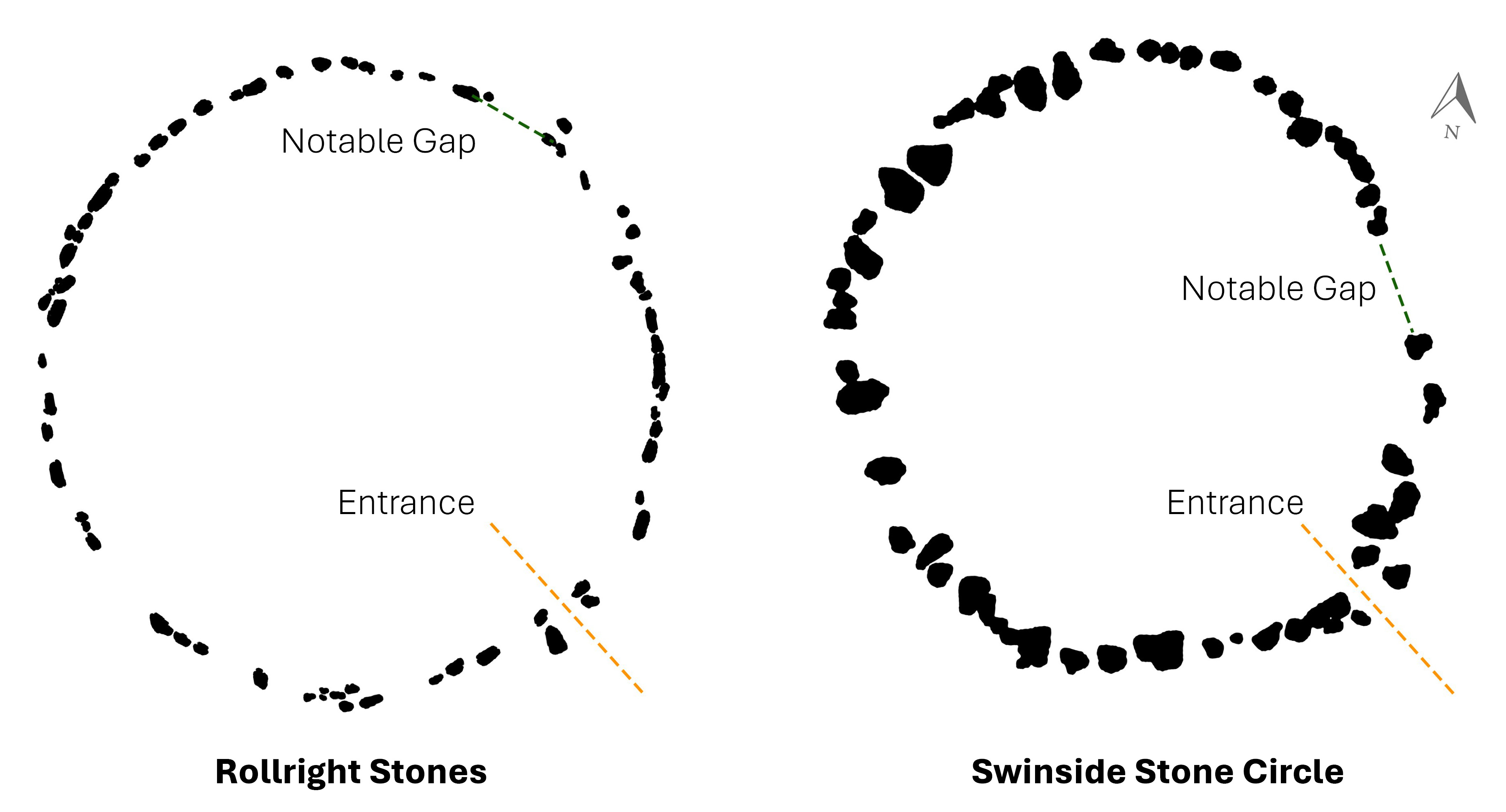
A comparison between the layout of Swinside stone circle and the King's Men

Meanwhile, archaeological excavation revealed that there was "no indication" of there having been "a substantial ditch" either inside or outside the bank on which the stones were positioned.

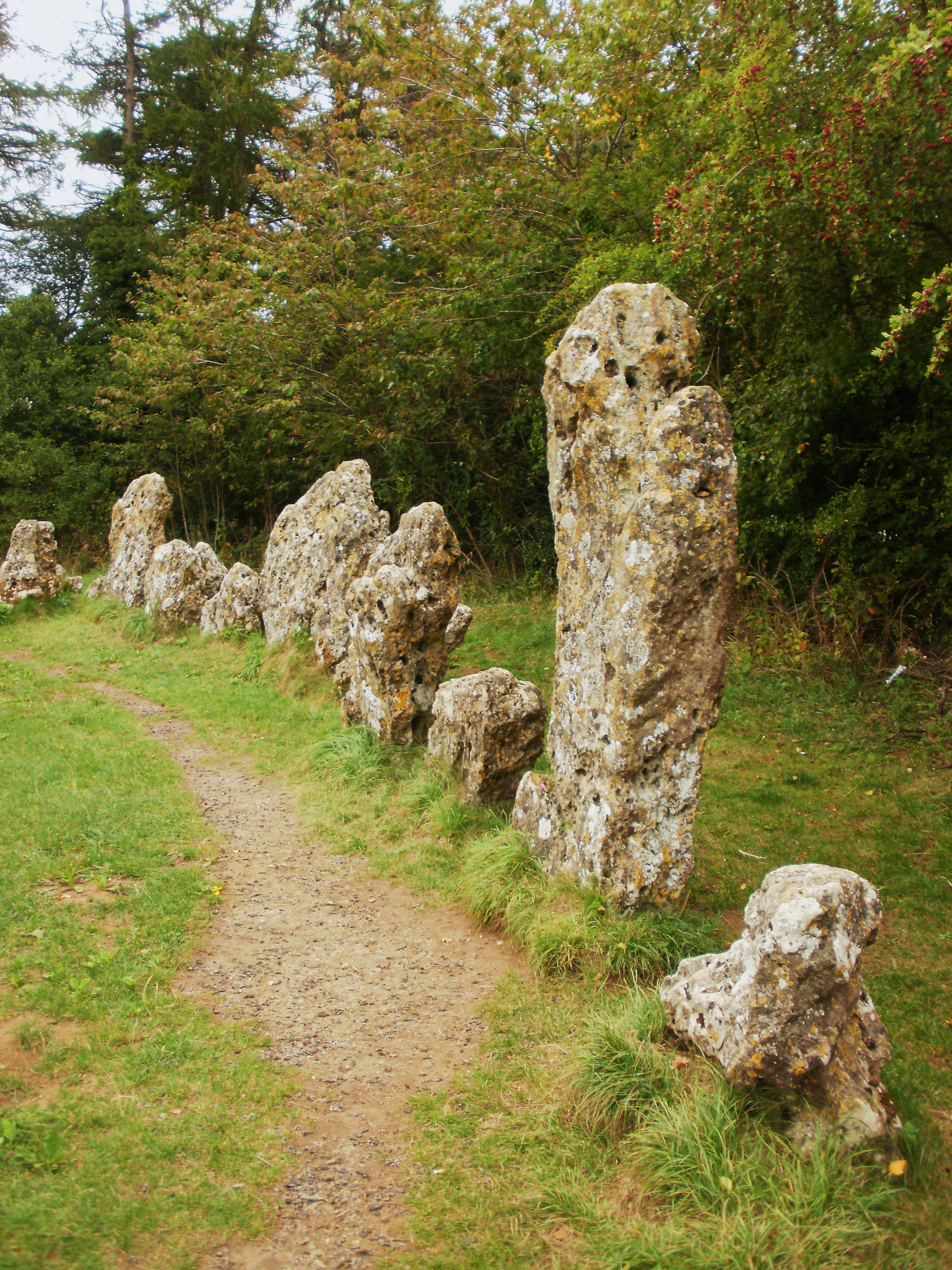
The largest stone in the King's Men

Making an estimate of the time and manpower required for this project, Lambrick concluded that each of the King's Men could have been constructed by a team of ten or twenty (depending on the size of the stone) in about two-and-a-half hours. He noted, however, that the time could have been reduced if the workers had been divided into two groups for some of the smaller stones. Concluding his examination of this issue, he argued that "83 journeys by the whole team would have been required, giving an actual construction time of c 137 hours, or 3735 manhours." Adding to this "210 manhours" for digging the post holes for the boulders, as well as "40 manhours for cutting timber and making the shear-legs and sledges", and "another 40 for fetching and trimming the timbers", Lambrick concluded that a total of around "4035 manhours" would have gone into the construction of the stone circle. This would have been about three weeks' work for around twenty workers.

Since the late 19th century, the monument has been in part a reconstruction. In 1882, the owner of the site re-erected around a third of the stones that had previously fallen. Some were moved from their original positions. Using documentary evidence and lichen growth analysis, archaeologists have established that around that time, several new stones were added to the circle in order to fill in gaps where the original stone had been lost or destroyed. Lambrick doubted that more than two of those currently standing were modern additions. Four of the other, smaller additions were stolen by vandals in the 20th century.

=== The King Stone ===
The King Stone is a single, weathered monolith, 2.4 metres high by 1.5 metres wide, standing 76 metres north of the King's Men. Unlike the other two of the Rollright monuments, it is of uncertain date. Many different interpretations have been made of the King Stone, with various arguments being presented as to what its original function was.

Lambrick catalogued six distinct hypotheses that had been presented by antiquarians and archaeologists over the preceding centuries and evaluated their likelihood. Some of these argued that it had been positioned in relation to the King's Men stone circle, with others instead suggesting that it was a component of a long barrow or other burial site.

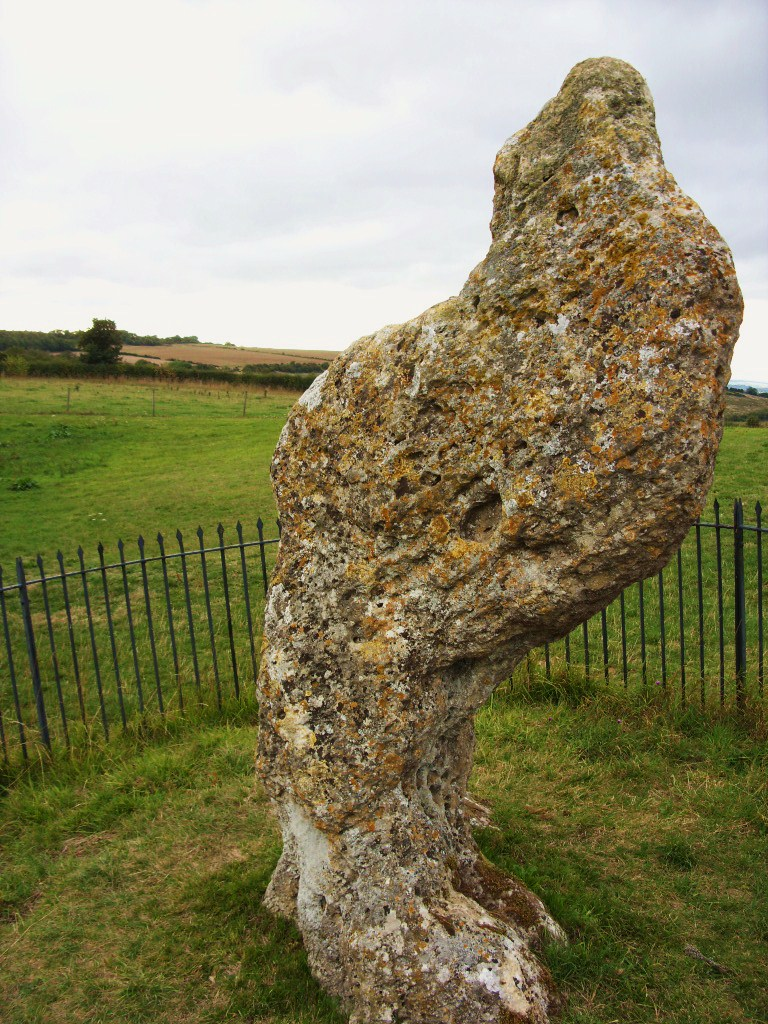
The King Stone, 2011

Lockyer (1909) and Thom (1967) suggested that the King Stone had been an astronomical marker that may at the same time have had a relation to the ceremonies being undertaken at the King's Men. Lambrick dismissed any astronomical significance as unlikely, because the Stone aligns only with the rising of the star Capella as it would have appeared circa 1750 BCE. He notes there is no evidence that late prehistoric Britons valued the stars as important; they did build several of their monuments to have solar or lunar alignments.

Megalithic specialist Aubrey Burl in 1976 suggested that the King Stone had been a landmark or guidepost designed to mark the position of the King's Men. Again, Lambrick disagreed with this, saying that its "position and orientation make it too inconspicuous to be satisfactory as a marker for anyone approaching the circle either along the ridge or from the alleys either side." Early antiquarian John Aubrey and archaeologist Arthur Evans had suggested that the monolith was a surviving remnant of a stone avenue that had once led to the King's Men. But Lambrick thought this unlikely, as no other archaeological evidence exists for such an avenue, and it would have been poorly aligned with the circle.

Other researchers had suggested that the stone was once a part of a long barrow. But Lambrick's archaeological investigation in the 1980s failed to reveal any other evidence for such a monument. Bloxham had suggested in 1847 that the monolith was associated with a burial, or a larger cemetery. Lambrick came to agree with him, "tentatively" interpreting the monolith as a cemetery marker, primarily because of the "unsatisfactory nature of other explanations and the existence nearby of Bronze Age barrows and cremations, one of which had been marked by a broad wooden post."

He estimated that when it was originally erected, the King Stone would have weighed somewhere in the region of 4.7 tonnes, but that since, much has been chipped away. Using his own estimates, Lambrick suggested that with a team of 58 workers, the King Stone could have been set up in about two hours.

== Folklore ==
=== Early Modern period ===
Numerous folktales are associated with the stones. A rhyming version was reported by William Camden in 1610. A king riding across the county with his army was accosted by a local witch called Mother Shipton. She said to him:

Seven long strides thou shalt take, says she
And if Long Compton thou canst see,
King of England thou shalt be!

His troops gathered in a circle to discuss the challenge, and his knights muttered amongst themselves, but the king boldly took seven steps forward. Rising ground blocked his view of Long Compton in the valley, and the witch cackled:

As Long Compton thou canst not see, King of England thou shalt not be! Rise up stick and stand still stone, For King of England thou shalt be none; Thou and thy men hoar stones shall be, And I myself an elder tree!

The king became the solitary King Stone, while nearby his soldiers formed a cromlech, or circle, called the King's Men. As the witch prepared to become an elder tree, she backtracked into four of the king's knights, who had lagged behind and were whispering plots against the king. She turned them to stone as well. Today they are called the Whispering Knights.

=== 18th and 19th centuries ===
Legend holds that as the church clock strikes midnight, the King Stone comes alive. Similarly, the king and his men were said to come to life on certain saints' days.

The Rollright Stones became associated with fertility in the late eighteenth and the nineteenth centuries. Several different, related local customs arose in the nineteenth century: Girls from local villages ran naked around the stones at midnight of Midsummer's Eve in the belief that they would see the man they were to marry. This drew upon earlier belief that eavesdropping upon the conversations of the living king and his men would likewise reveal the name of their future husband. Childless wives may have prayed to or near the King Stone, or rubbed their bare breasts on the King Stone as part of a local fertility-related custom.

== Antiquarian and archaeological investigation and preservation ==
=== Mediaeval accounts ===
The earliest known written account describing the Rollrights comes from the 14th century CE, during the Late Mediaeval period in Britain. It was at this time that an unknown author wrote a tract entitled De Mirabilibus Britanniae (The Wonders of Britain) in which the prehistoric monuments at Stonehenge and the White Horse of Uffington were mentioned alongside the Rollrights. As the author related:

In the neighbourhood of Oxford there are great stones, arranged as it were in some connection by the hand of man. But at what time; or by what people; or for what memorial or significance, is unknown. Though the place is called by the inhabitants Rollendrith.

The nearby village, Great Rollright, is spelt as "Magna Rollandryght" in 1430. The other village, Little Rollright, appears (in Latin) as "Parva Roulondryght" in 1460.

=== Early Modern antiquarianism ===
"[A] little river... speedeth him into Isis: which riveret on the very border of the shire passeth by an ancient Monument standing not farre from his bank, to wit, certaine large stones placed in a round circle (the common people usually call them Rolle-rich stones, and dreameth that they were sometimes men by a wonderfull Metamorphosis turned into hard stones)."

— William Camden, Britannia, 1586, translated by P. Holland, 1637

It was in the 16th century, during the early modern period of British history, that further written accounts of the Rollrights were made; one of the earliest of these was provided by the pioneering antiquarian John Leland (c.1503–1552) in his unpublished account of his travels across England, Itinerary. Nonetheless, despite the fact that he referred to it, he failed to go into any detail.

A more detailed account was made by his fellow antiquarian, William Camden (1551–1623), who wrote about it in his 1586 work Britannia, a topographical and historical survey of all of Great Britain and Ireland. Describing the stones and some of the folklore that the locals attributed to them, Camden went on to hypothesise that they were constructed as a "memorial of some victory, perhaps by Rollo the Dane, who later possessed property in Normandy."

=== John Aubrey and William Stukeley ===
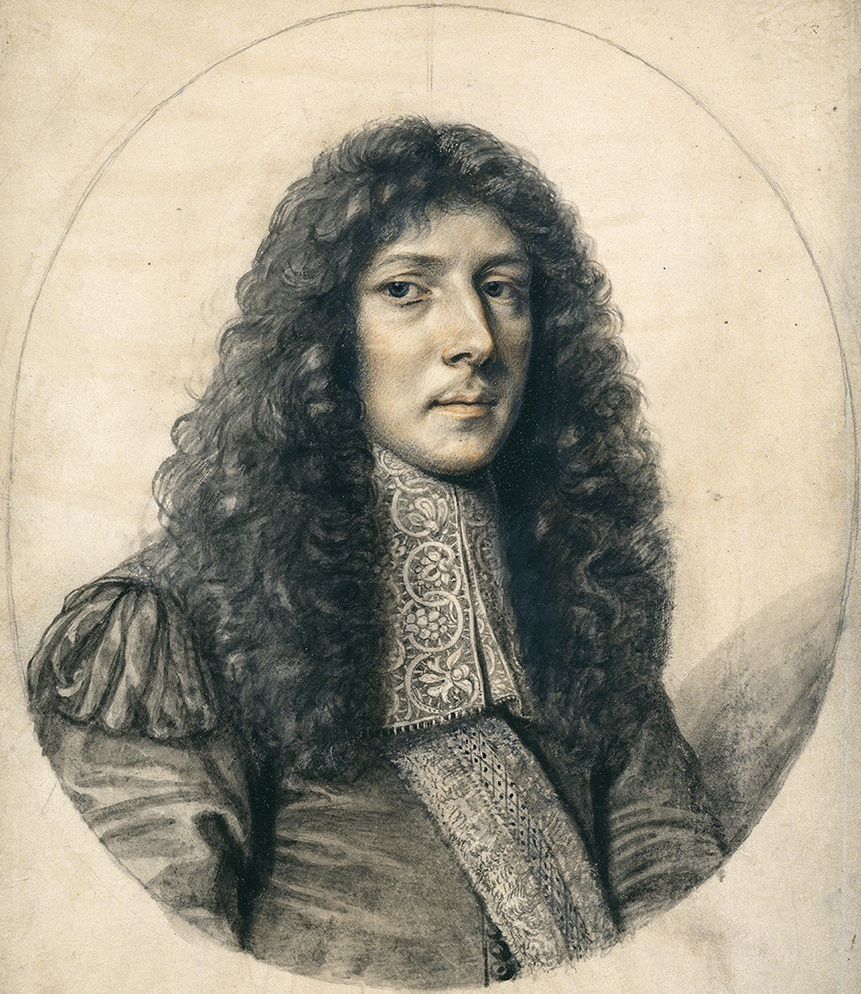
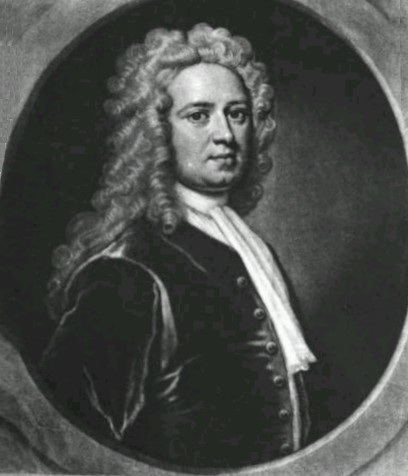
The antiquarians John Aubrey and William Stukeley

The antiquarians John Aubrey and William Stukeley were responsible for initiating modern study of Neolithic monuments such as Stonehenge, Avebury and the Rollrights.

=== Sheldon Tapestry Map ===
An Elizabethan tapestry map of Warwickshire (the Sheldon Tapestry Map), created during the late 1580s for hanging in the home of Ralph Sheldon of Long Compton, is believed to be the earliest known depiction of the Rollright Stones on a map. After conservation and cleaning of the tapestry in 2012 it was noted for the first time that a number of monoliths, perhaps forming a stone circle, appear to be shown in the vicinity of Long Compton.

=== Inspectorate of Ancient Monuments investigation: 1981–86 ===
At the start of the 1980s, the state-appointed Inspectorate of Ancient Monuments commissioned an investigation into the Rollright Stones and their immediate surroundings "in order that a fully integrated policy for the future preservation and management of the complex might be formulated." This investigation took place between 1981 and 1982, and involved both archaeologists and historical researchers. As a part of the initial survey, historians undertook documentary research, examining the reports and accounts of the site that had been produced since the 17th century, with particular emphasis on antiquarian and early archaeological drawings. Aerial photographs of the area were looked at for signs of prehistoric crop marks, whilst both a geophysical survey and a fieldwalk of the area were undertaken.

With the surveying over, the investigators moved on to excavation, opening up several limited trial trenches, as well as excavating in its entirety one small round barrow, which had been heavily ploughed out. Excavator George Lambrick noted that, although the excavations had "limited scope", "a substantial new body of data" was uncovered, revealing a number of lithics, pieces of pottery, soil profile changes, molluscan assemblages, carbonised plant remains and both animal and human bones, allowing archaeologists to build up a much wider image of the site and its surroundings.

An interim report on the project's findings was published in a booklet written by Lambrick in 1983. He followed this up with an outline of the management history of the Stones, published in 1986. Lambrick's third book on the monument appeared in 1988, published by the U.K. governmental body English Heritage as The Rollright Stones: Megaliths, monuments, and settlement in the prehistoric landscape. Containing the full site report, it was "the first full record and analysis of the King's Men, the Whispering Knights, the King Stone, and their archaeological setting" and, in the book's preface, the then Inspector of Ancient Monuments A.J. Fleming commented that the "survey provides a firm basis for the improved management of the monument."

== Contemporary use ==
=== Contemporary Paganism ===
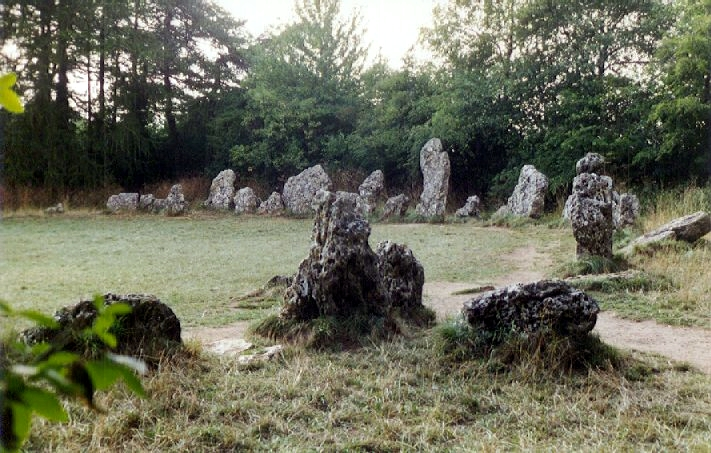
The King's Men

In 1959, the Bricket Wood coven of Gardnerian Wiccans met for a ritual at the King's Men, at which they hoped to reunite with the a group led by Doreen Valiente who had splintered from them several years before. Pagan studies scholar Ethan Doyle White suggested that this site was chosen because it was neutral ground not owned by either coven and because it had folkloric associations with the supernatural. Doyle White argued that the megalith's folkloric associations with witchcraft were a key reason why Wiccans chose to adopt the site as a place for ritual; he highlighted that Valiente had discussed these folk tales in her books Where Witchcraft Lives (1962) and An ABC of Witchcraft (1973).

In 1975, the English ceremonial magician William G. Gray published a book entitled The Rollright Ritual which described his personal experiences with the site. In the book, Gray described a group of witches using the site, whose practices were reminiscent of those of his friend Robert Cochrane. Although it is unknown if Cochrane and his coven ever met at the site, The Regency, a Pagan group founded in 1966 by some of the coven's members, did continue to meet there during the 1970s.

Many Pagans seek to meditate at the site with the intent of communing with spirit entities believed to reside there, while the American Pagan Diana Paxson has discussed her own performance of seidr at the site. Pagans have also left votive offerings at the site, which includes flowers and fruit, incense sticks, and tea lights, some of which has been characterised as "ritual litter" by heritage managers. In 2003, an archaeological excavation in the centre of the King's Men circle revealed two recently buried crystals, while in 2011, Doyle White observed flowers inserted into cracks and fissures in the megaliths. Particular concern has been expressed about some offerings and other Pagan actions that damage the stones, such as coins that are wedged into cracks in the rock and fires that damage the rock itself as well as flora and lichen. Some Pagans have also had their cremated ashes scattered at the site. Within the Pagan community, concerns have been expressed about some practitioners tampering with the 'energies' of the site during their rituals. For instance, a number of local Pagans were offended when US-based practitioners organised a "Prophets' Conference", during which they planned to visit the site in order to "awaken the stones" through ritual; local Pagans argued that the stones were already "awakened", and successfully lobbied for the conference organisers to cancel the event.

Examining the relationship between archaeologists and Pagans in early 21st-century Britain, archaeologist Robert Wallis and anthropologist Jenny Blain noted that members of both communities have "made common cause" at the Rollright Stones, developing "a climate of inclusivity and multivocality" which has produced "fruitful negotiation".

=== Earth Mysteries ===
The site has also attracted interest from individuals involved in the Earth Mysteries movement. Alfred Watkins suggested that the Rollright Stones were part of a ley line running through Long Compton church, Chipping Norton church, and a tumulus near Charlbury. During the late 1970s, the Dragon Project — led by the Earth Mysteries proponent Paul Devereux — carried out investigations at the site in an attempt to determine if any anomalous phenomena could be detected there. They concluded that ultrasonic pulsing could be detected at the King Stone at sunrise, while there were no ultrasound readings in the King's Men circle at the summer solstice, suggesting that the stones acted as a shield from the low levels of ultrasound found elsewhere in the landscape. Devereux and Thomson suggested that the Stones were also part of another ley line, running from Arbury Banks in Northamptonshire to All Saints Church in Wroxton. A third putative ley line involving the Rollright Stones has also been suggested, running from the King's Men circle to the Uffington White Horse.

=== The Rollright Trust ===
During the 1990s, the owner of the site, Pauline Flick, decided to sell it. In 1997 a campaign was launched by individuals — including a number of Pagans who used the site for ritual purposes — who feared that it would be purchased by those who would either turn it into a commercialised tourist attraction or prevent anyone from visiting it. They established a private charity, the Rollright Trust, which was eventually able to secure ownership through private donations and a grant from the Hanson Environment Fund. A ceremony was held in which the deeds were handed over the Trust in 2001, in which a performance was given by Morris dancers and local primary school pupils enacted a play of the story about the king and the witch.

The Trust charges a small entry fee to allow access to the King's Men circle. It emphasises a preservation ethos, attempting to prevent any damage to the megaliths, and has reinforced the paths around the site, enabling wheelchair access to the Whispering Knights. The sites have experienced vandalism in this period; in the summer of 2001 a piece of the King Stone was chipped off, while in April 2004, yellow gloss paint was splashed onto the King's Men. Some of these may be protests against the use of the site by modern Pagans. Under the Trust's ownership, the site has been overseen by a paid manager and a number of voluntary wardens. The Trust erected a wardens' hut at the site, from which it sold both archaeological literature and publications by Pagan and earth mysteries groups. In January 2006, the hut was damaged beyond repair in an arson attack, with a group calling itself the Rollright Project holding benefit gigs to raise money for a replacement.

A registered charity, as of 2007 the Trust had on its board individuals from a range of backgrounds, including both Christians and Pagans, archaeologists, a biologist, and a landscape architect. The Trust has engaged with the Pagan community from the start, and allows Pagan groups to book slots in which they can perform ceremonies at the site.

=== Popular culture ===
The Doctor Who serial The Stones of Blood (1978) featured several scenes taped at the Rollright Stones. The site was presented as a fictional stone circle in Cornwall, at which modern Druids are worshipping an ancient goddess who turns out to be a malevolent alien.

The English rock band Traffic recorded a song named "Roll Right Stones" from their 1973 album Shoot Out at the Fantasy Factory. The indie rock band Half Man Half Biscuit mention the stones in the song "Twenty Four Hour Garage People" on their 2000 album Trouble Over Bridgwater.

In 2003, to mark the centenary of the Art Fund, "Turning the World Inside Out", a 1996 sculpture by Anish Kapoor, was relocated to the centre of the King's Men for several months. The Trust also permits an annual performance of one of the plays of William Shakespeare at the site.
