= Over Norton =

Village in Oxfordshire, England

Coordinates: 51.953°N 1.542°W

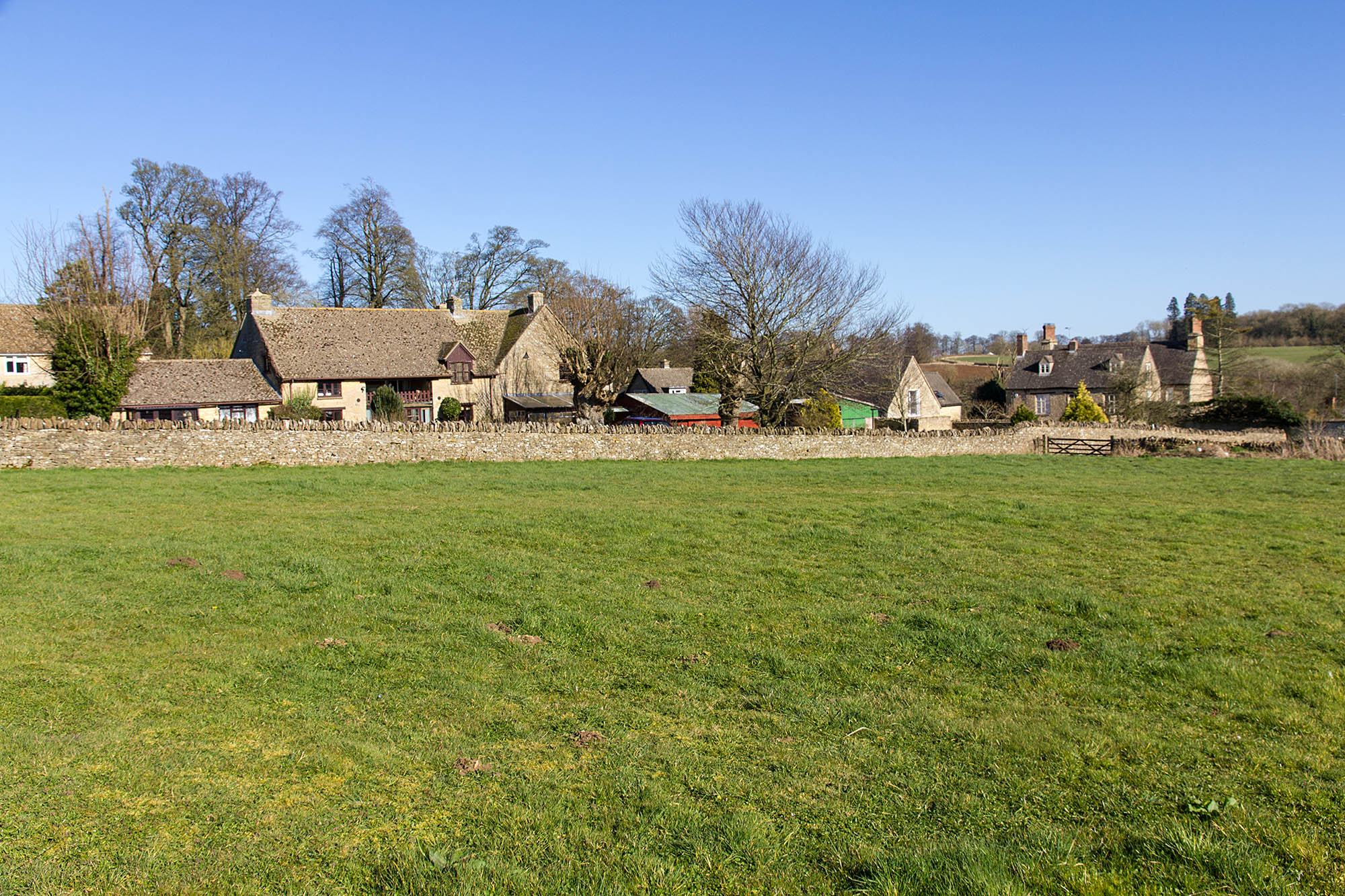

- Location within Oxfordshire
- Civil parish: Over Norton
- District: West Oxfordshire
- Shire county: Oxfordshire
- Region: South East
- Country: England
- Sovereign state: United Kingdom
- Post town: Chipping Norton
- Postcode district: OX7
- Dialling code: 01608
- Police: Thames Valley
- Fire: Oxfordshire
- Ambulance: South Central
- UK Parliament: Banbury
- Website: Over Norton Parish Council

Over Norton is a village and civil parish within the West Oxfordshire district, about 1 mile (2 km) north of Chipping Norton, Oxfordshire, England. Over Norton Park is a farm beside the village.

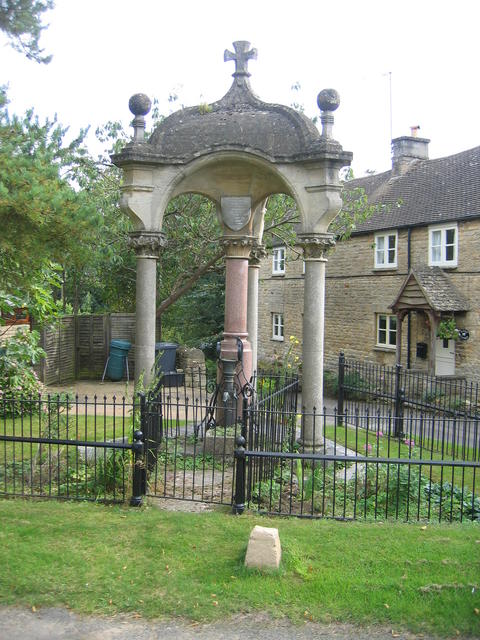
The Village Pump

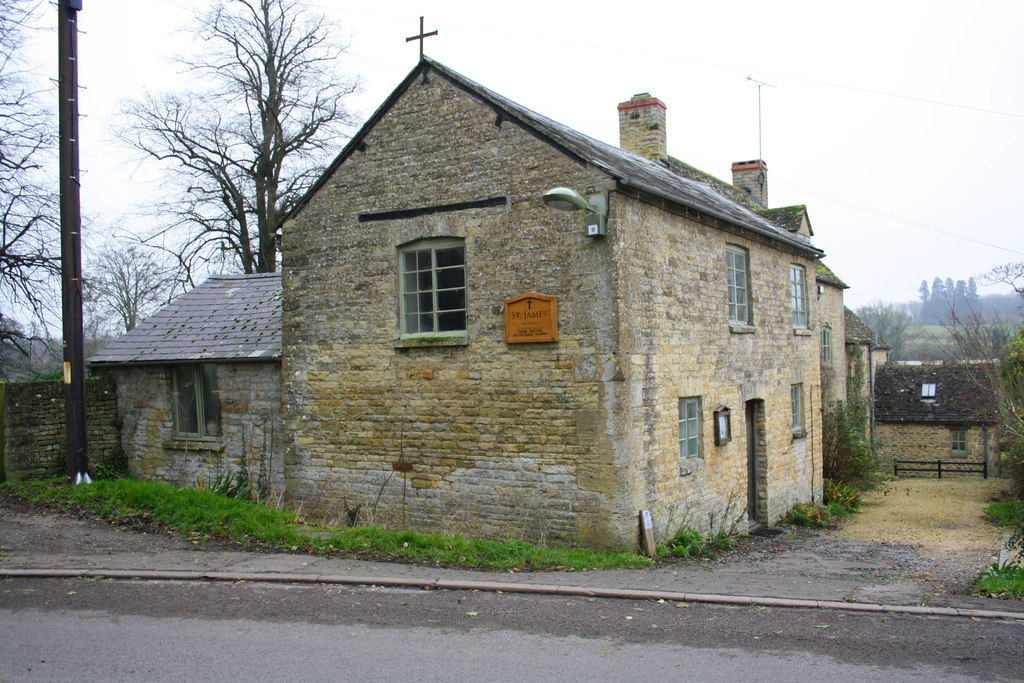
St James' Church

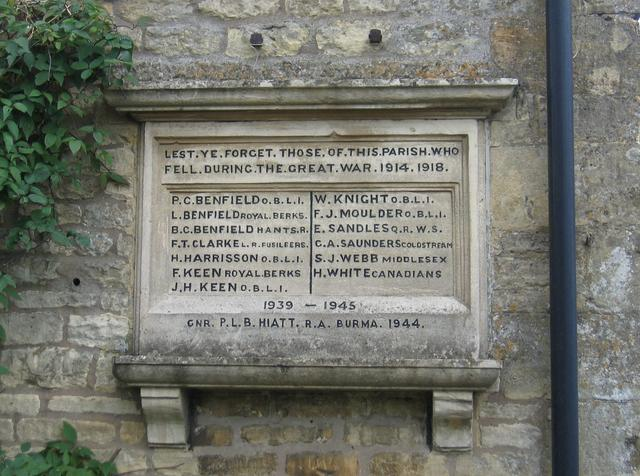
The War Memorial
