= Hook Norton ironstone quarries =

Hook Norton ironstone quarries may refer to:

- Hook Norton ironstone quarries (Baker)
- Hook Norton ironstone quarries (Brymbo)
- Hook Norton Ironstone Partnership
