= Hook Norton ironstone quarries (Baker) =

Historical quarries in Oxfordshire, England

Coordinates: 52.0034°N 1.4832°W

Hook Norton Baker's Ironstone Quarries, East End

The Hook Norton ironstone quarries (Baker) were ironstone quarries at Hook Norton, Oxfordshire, England, operating from the 1890s to the end of the First World War. Two sites were quarried, and it was the only Hook Norton ironstone quarry business that was owned locally.

== History ==
The quarry owner, Henry William Baker, came from Worcester and married Mary Ann Minchin, the daughter of William Minchin of East End Farm. Henry Baker lived in East End Farmhouse and is described in directories and census returns as a farmer; therefore his ironstone quarries were presumably a sideline. It is believed that quarrying began in the 1890s ("about 1895" according to Paul Ingham) and "virtually certain" that the first quarry was Top Pit. Henry Baker died in 1915, but the demands of the First World War meant that production continued for a while, although it had ceased by 1918.

== Top Pit ==
Top Pit was located on the East side of the Sibford Road; Redlands Dairy Farm occupied the site in 2012.

== Gooseacre Pit ==
According to Tonks, "There was also a very small working.... in the field known as Gooseacre" (on the opposite side of the road from Top Pit). Tonks states that in 1988 the location of the pit is "marked by a gullet, part of it now a pond". However, Ordnance Survey maps of 1881 and 1977 show an identical pond, thus raising the question as to whether Tonks was correct in his identification of the gullet.

== Bottom Pit ==
Bottom Pit was located next to Station Road, on the north side opposite the railway station entrance. Tonks calls this "Station Field" but other historians have identified Station Field as being the area now occupied by Austins Way. The quarry was originally operated by the Hook Norton Ironstone Partnership and it "seems probable" that it was leased by that company from Henry Baker. After the Partnership ceased operations in 1904, Baker continued operations on his own account. These excavations obliterated part of the partnership's tramway line and the site of the winding house. The tramway tunnel was used for storage.

== Operations ==
All work was done by hand, employing about 20 men and boys. Four horse-drawn carts served Top Pit and three carts Bottom Pit. The ore was taken to Hook Norton Station yard where it was shovelled into wagons. The output went to Lilleshall Ironworks, Round Oak Steelworks and Cardiff. From 1897 ore was sold to Brymbo (who paid 1/6 per ton) and taken to their Hook Norton calcining plant. Being a farmer, Henry Baker required that when the quarrymen removed the overburden, topsoil and subsoil were segregated and replaced in sequence when the ore had been removed. Other ironstone quarries did not take this care when replacing the overburden, with the result that the restored ground was poor for agricultural use.

== See also ==
- Hook Norton ironstone quarries (Brymbo)

== Bibliography ==
- Tonks, Eric (April 1988). The Ironstone Quarries of the Midlands Part 2: The Oxfordshire Field. Cheltenham: Runpast Publishing. ISBN 1-870-754-026.
- Ingham, Paul (2000). Two Foot gauge Rails to the Ironstone. Garndolbenmaen: RCL Publications. ISBN 0-9538763-0-6.
- Dickins, Margaret (1928). A History of Hook Norton. Banbury: Banbury Guardian.
- Oxfordshire (Map). 1:2500. Ordnance Survey. 1900.
