= The Warriner School =

Location
- Bloxham Grove; Bloxham; Banbury, Oxfordshire, OX15 4LJ; England; 52°01′37″N 1°22′03″W

Information
- Type: Academy
- Motto: Responsible - Respectful - Ready
- Established: 1971
- Local authority: Oxfordshire
- Department for Education URN: 142218 Tables
- Ofsted: Reports
- Headteacher: Annabel Kay
- Gender: Coeducational
- Age: 11 to 18
- Enrolment: 1812
- Website: thewarrinerschool.co.uk

The Warriner School is a coeducational secondary school in Bloxham, Oxfordshire, England. The school opened in 1971 and now has 1,500 pupils in the 11–18 age range, having opened a sixth form in September 2013. It has Technology College status and serves the villages in the northern half of the Cherwell District. It has a large school farm.

== History ==
The school opened in 1971, as part of changes to educational provision in Banbury. Hook Norton Secondary School was closed, and half the pupils transferred to the Warriner School and the others to Chipping Norton Comprehensive School. Children at Windmill School in Deddington also transferred to the Warriner School, though the Windmill School site became an annexe to the Warriner School. It also meant that children in Bloxham no longer had to travel to the Banbury School. On opening, there were 500 pupils attending Warriner School. The new school had cost £400,000 to build. The school was named after the Warriner family, who had farmed the land on which the school was built, and particularly Henry Warriner. An alternative name, the Beauchamp-Fiennes School, was rejected by prospective pupils, who feared being called the BFs.

== Farming and rural studies ==
The school premises contain a farm, 120 acres (0.49 km^{2}) in size and fully organic for livestock and grassland. The school has won the NFU's Rural School Of The Year Award 2005 and SSAT's Most Improved Schools Club Award 2005–06. The farm sells its produce, including, meat, eggs, and livestock, although school farm produce is not used for student consumption. In late 2015, the Warriner School farm shop closed down due to lack of sales. The farm itself still runs.

== Partnership and academy status ==
A school partnership is a group of schools that are usually primary schools feeding into the same secondary school.

The Warriner Partnership contains the following schools:

- Bishop Loveday School in Bodicote, Oxfordshire
- Bishop Carpenter School in North Newington, Oxfordshire
- Sibford Gower Endowed Primary School in Sibford Gower, Oxfordshire
- Christopher Rawlins School in Adderbury, Oxfordshire
- Hornton School in Hornton
- Bloxham Primary School in Bloxham, Oxfordshire
- Shenington School in Shenington, Oxfordshire
- Wroxton School in Wroxton, Oxfordshire
- Dr Radcliffes School in Steeple Aston, Oxfordshire
- Deddington School in Deddington, Oxfordshire

In August 2015, The Warriner School converted to academy status and is now part of The Warriner Multi Academy Trust.

== February 2023 protests ==
On 24 February 2023, the students of The Warriner School staged a protest sparked by an email regarding uniform changes. The email sent to parents the previous evening stated that beginning in September 2023 trousers would be compulsory for all girls. The protest received press coverage, with articles published by BBC News, The Banbury Guardian, Oxfordshire Live, The Daily Telegraph, The Independent, The Mirror, the Daily Mail, Oxford Mail, The Northampton Chronicle and Banbury FM, resulting in a press release being published by Executive Headteacher Dr Annabel Kay.

== Notable former pupils ==
- Jo Joyner, actress
- Lloyd Sabin, cricketer
- Sean Woodcock, Labour MP for Banbury (2024–present)
