= Hook Norton ironstone quarries (Brymbo) =

Ironstone quarries in Oxfordshire, England

Coordinates: 52.002289°N 1.464782°W

Brymbo Ironworks Railway
Overview
- Headquarters: Hook Norton
- Locale: England
- Dates of operation: 1899–1946
- Successor: Abandoned

Technical
- Track gauge: 2 ft (610 mm)

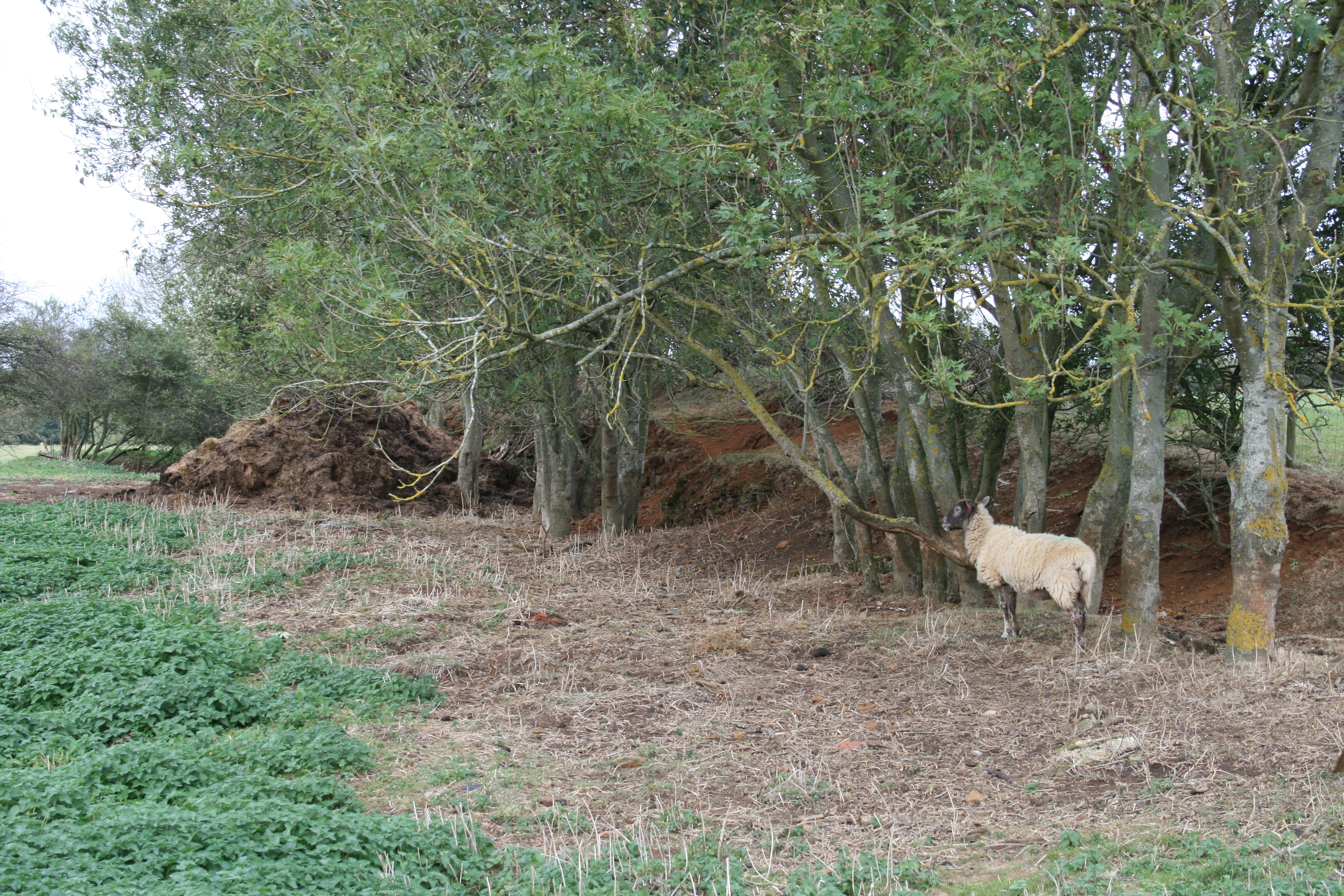
Hook Norton Brymbo Park Farm ironstone quarry

The Hook Norton ironstone quarries (Brymbo) were ironstone quarries near Hook Norton in Oxfordshire, England. The quarries were in operation from 1899 to 1946, supplying ironstone to the Brymbo Steelworks in Wrexham and were served by the Brymbo Ironworks Railway, an extensive, 2 ft (610 mm) narrow gauge industrial railway.

== History ==
=== Brymbo Ironworks ===
The original Brymbo Ironworks was founded near Wrexham in Wales in 1798 by John Wilkinson. Wilkinson was a pioneer of the Industrial Revolution and made a significant fortune from his ironworks. When he died in 1808, his company was held in trust for many years due to a legal dispute over his will. In 1842 a new company was formed to run the Brymbo Ironworks, and following successful steel-making experiments, the Brymbo Steel Company was incorporated in 1884.

=== Hook Norton quarries and kilns ===
By 1897, the works were close to exhausting its source of ironstone near Wrexham and sought an alternative quarry to feed its furnaces. Ironstone fields near Hook Norton were bought and a works set up to calcine the ore. A second kiln was brought into service in June 1900. A narrow gauge internal tramway system was built to serve the quarry and works. This grew to be the largest 2 ft (610 mm) gauge railway in the British steel-making industry.

The kilns were sited next to the standard gauge Banbury and Cheltenham Direct Railway (part of the Great Western Railway) at Council Hill Sidings, three-quarters of a mile east of Hook Norton Station.

Six cottages were built near the works to house skilled personnel, some transferred from Wrexham. Brymbo had little hope of obtaining skilled workers locally, stating:

labour will have to be imported, as there has been no unemployment here for a long time past. (Banbury Guardian, quoted in "The Ironstone Quarries of the Midlands")

=== Hook Norton tramway ===
The first section of the tramway was built, running south from the works, through a tunnel under Hook Norton to Milcombe Road and past the cottages to a quarry of 152 acres at Park Farm. The tramway was soon extended to the west, passing under the B&CDR viaduct to a new quarry near the village. This quarry was exhausted by 1903, and a new quarry at Manor Farm east of the viaduct was opened. Trains of calcined ore ran from Hook Norton to Brymbo on Mondays, Wednesdays and Fridays every week. Ore was also supplied by the independent Hook Norton ironstone quarries of H.W. Baker. Initially this ore was delivered direct to Hook Norton Station by horse and cart. Later the Baker ore was taken to the Brymbo works site where it could be emptied into wagons or calcined as desired.

=== Expansion ===
In 1909, there was a major expansion when Brymbo was able to purchase the land and property of the bankrupt Hook Norton Ironstone Partnership. This included the area known as "Redlands" north of the works on the far side of the B&CDR. A new tramway route was built, passing under an existing bridge carrying the B&CDR. With the opening of the Redlands quarry, shipments of ore to Wrexham consisted of 50% Park Farm ore and 50% Redlands and Bakers. Owing to the different properties of the stone, this produced a "self-fluxing" charge in the blast furnace.

=== World War I ===
The outbreak of the First World War saw a significant increase in demand for iron and steel to feed the munitions factories. A second locomotive, Joan, was obtained in 1915 and a third kiln built at an unknown date early in the war. Ironstone output rose to 5000 tons per week. More land was acquired to expand the Redlands quarry with the purchase of Whitehills Farm in 1916.

=== Oxfordshire Ironstone Company ===
In 1917, a new company, the Oxfordshire Ironstone Company, was formed as a joint venture by Baldwin's Steel and Brymbo Steel. This company controlled operations at Hook Norton and also the quarries at Wroxton. After the Armistice in November 1918 there was a short-lived boom and plans were made to re-open the Partnership's Townsend Quarry. A tramway route was constructed, but rails were never laid.

=== 1920s ===
A fourth kiln was built in 1922. After this, demand for steel fell rapidly, and the recession of the late 1920s further depressed the economic situation. Activity during the 1920s was low, with mainly the Park Farm quarry being worked. From May to July 1921 all works stopped due to the Miners Strike, and when work restarted only two kilns were used. Calcining was discontinued in 1926 following a shutdown during the general strike, with the ore being shipped "raw" after that time. By early 1927 no ore was being shipped to Wrexham, the Hook Norton quarries having to seek customers elsewhere.

=== 1930s ===
In June 1931, Brymbo went into receivership. In the late 1930s the Hook Norton quarries were leased by Mr Harmar-Brown but operations were on a small scale, only Park Farm Quarry being worked, often for only one day a week. The newest kiln was used to dry the ore but not for calcining.

=== World War II ===
The Second World War saw an increase in demand for iron and steel, and in 1941 the Ministry of Supply wrote urging that production should be increased. The ministry arranged for the Welsh Highland Railway's 2-6-2T Russell to be transferred to Hook Norton and also supplied a diesel dragline. Betty, an 0-4-0ST Hunslet was also obtained . Four of the five locos would be steamed daily to cope with production.

=== Closure ===
Immediately after the end of the war, cheaper European ore and steel became available again, and the fortunes of Brymbo's Hook Norton operation rapidly declined. On 22 June 1946, the quarry closed for the last time, and all the plant and land were sold or scrapped in 1948.

== Locomotives ==
Name	Builder	Type	Date	Works number	Notes
Gwen	Hudswell Clarke	0-4-2ST	1898	523	
Joan	Hudswell Clarke	0-4-2ST	1915	1173	
ROD No.352 (unofficially known as Black Bess)	Hunslet	4-6-0T	1917	1264	ex-War Department Light Railways
Russell	Hunslet	2-6-2T	1906	901	ex-Welsh Highland Railway. Now preserved on the Welsh Highland Heritage Railway
Betty	Hunslet	0-4-0ST	1912	1101	ex-Penmaenmawr & Welsh Granite Co., Trefor Quarry railway

With the exception of Russell, all locomotives were scrapped on site in 1949.

== Remains in 2011 ==
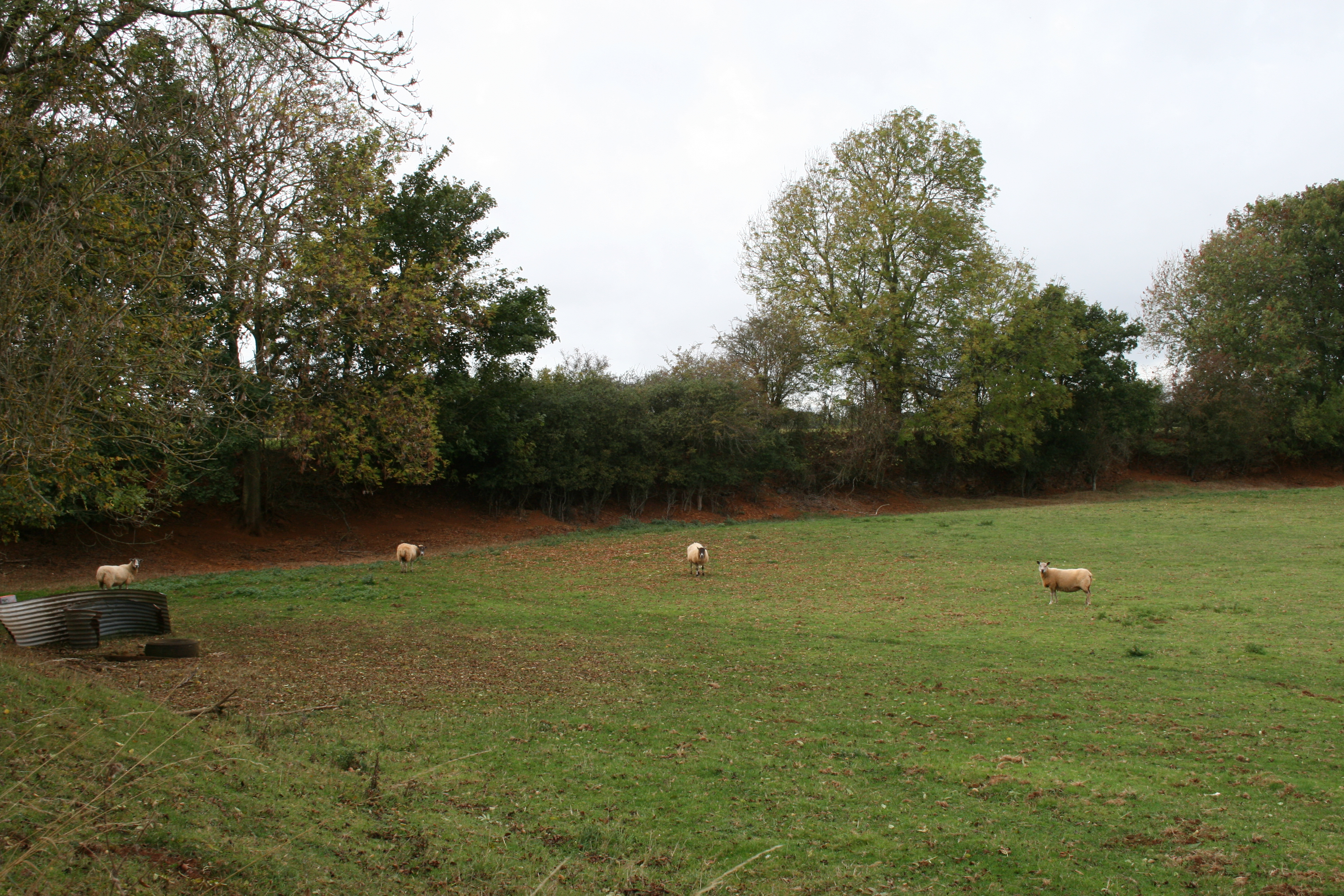
Manor Farm Quarry

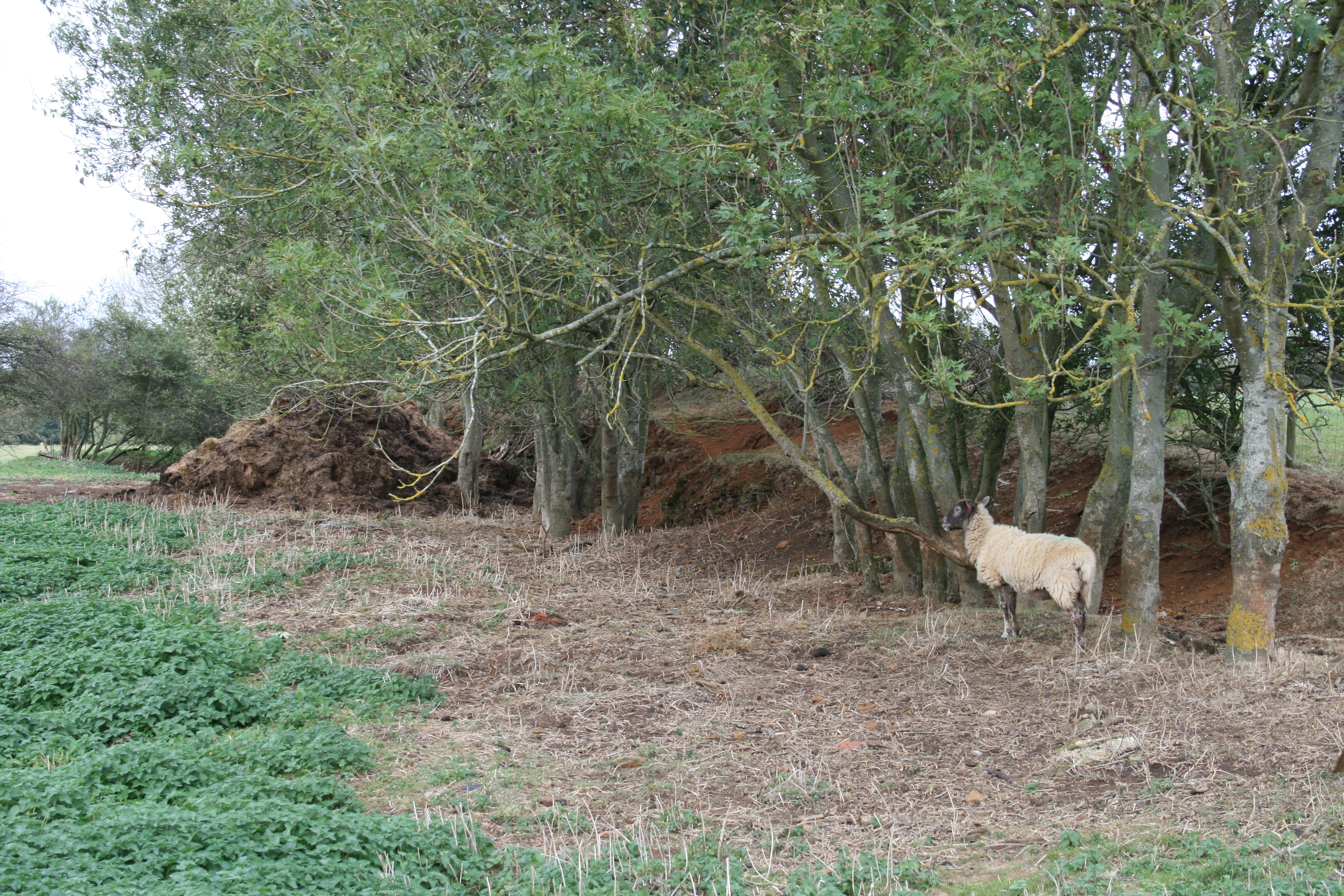
Park Farm Quarry

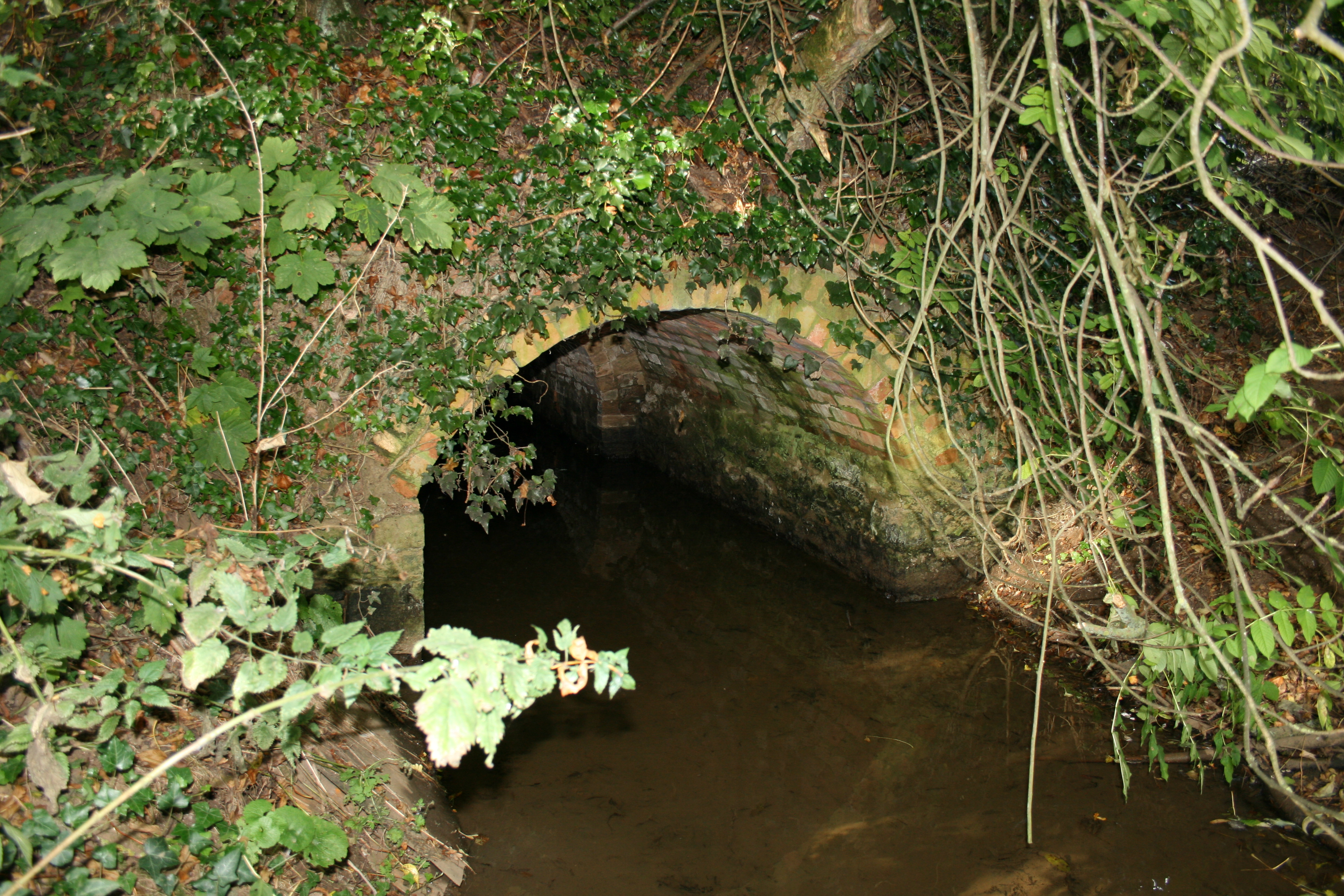
Bridge taking a stream under the tramway to Park Farm.

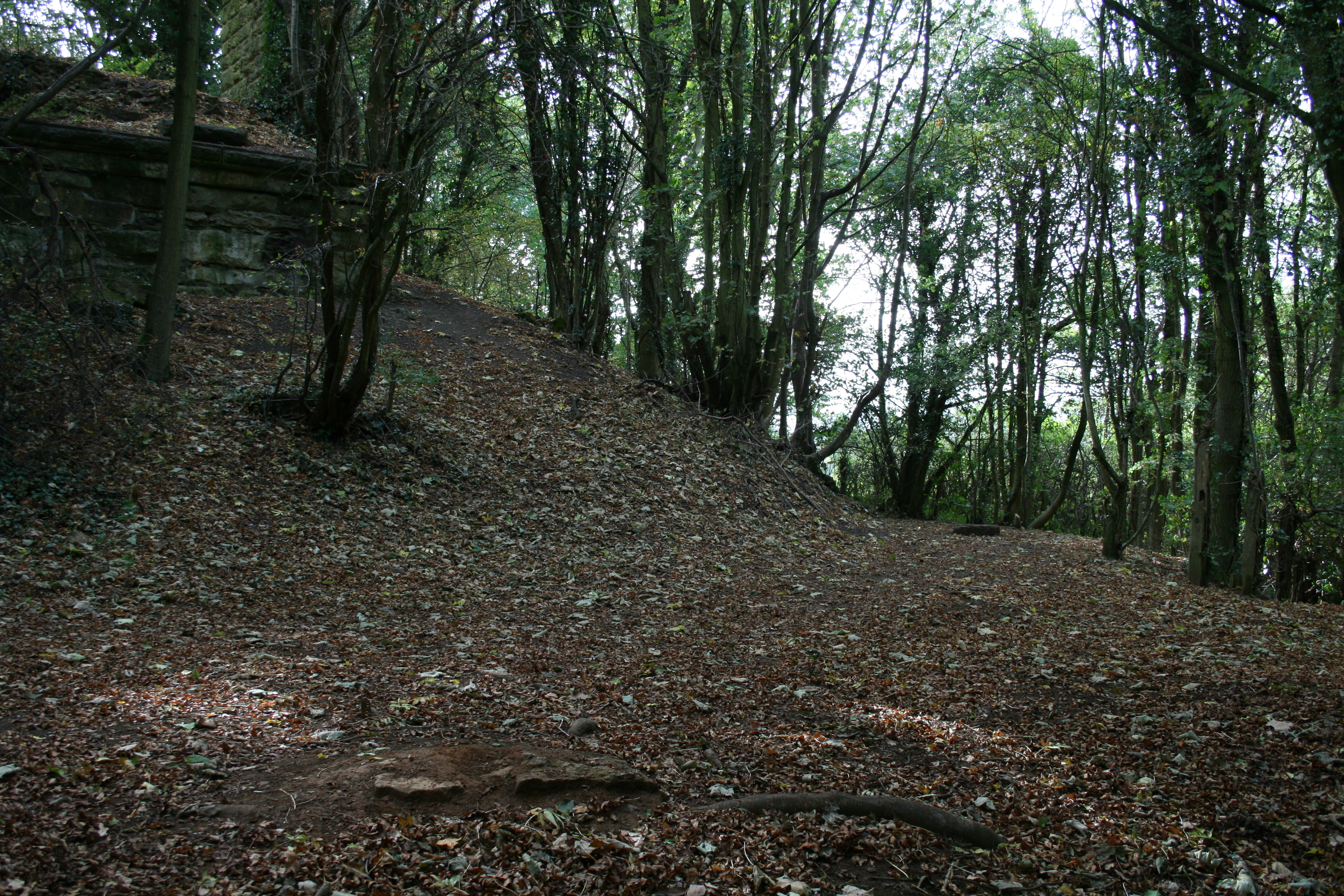
The tramway route under the standard-gauge viaduct.

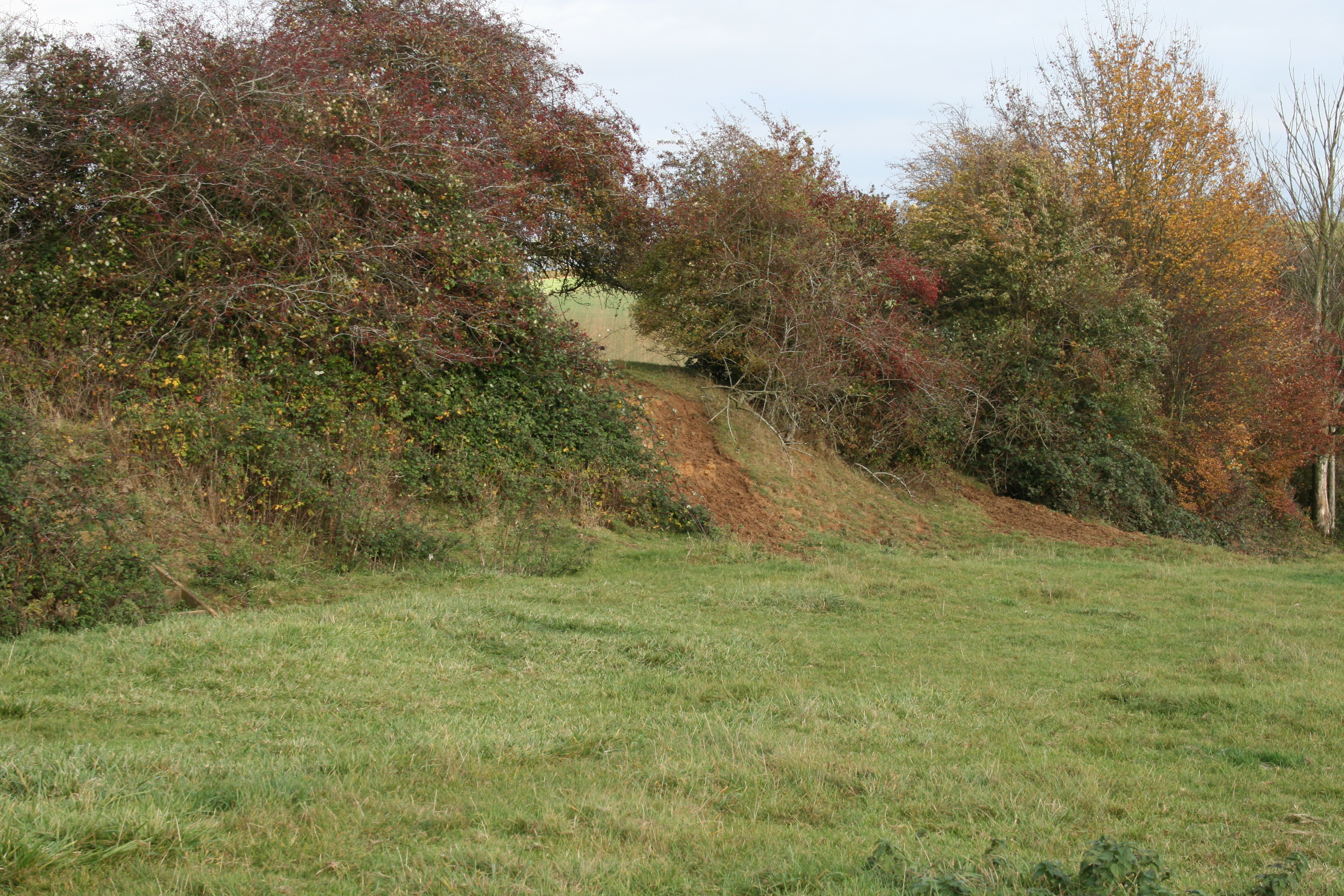
Nill face, Redlands Quarry.

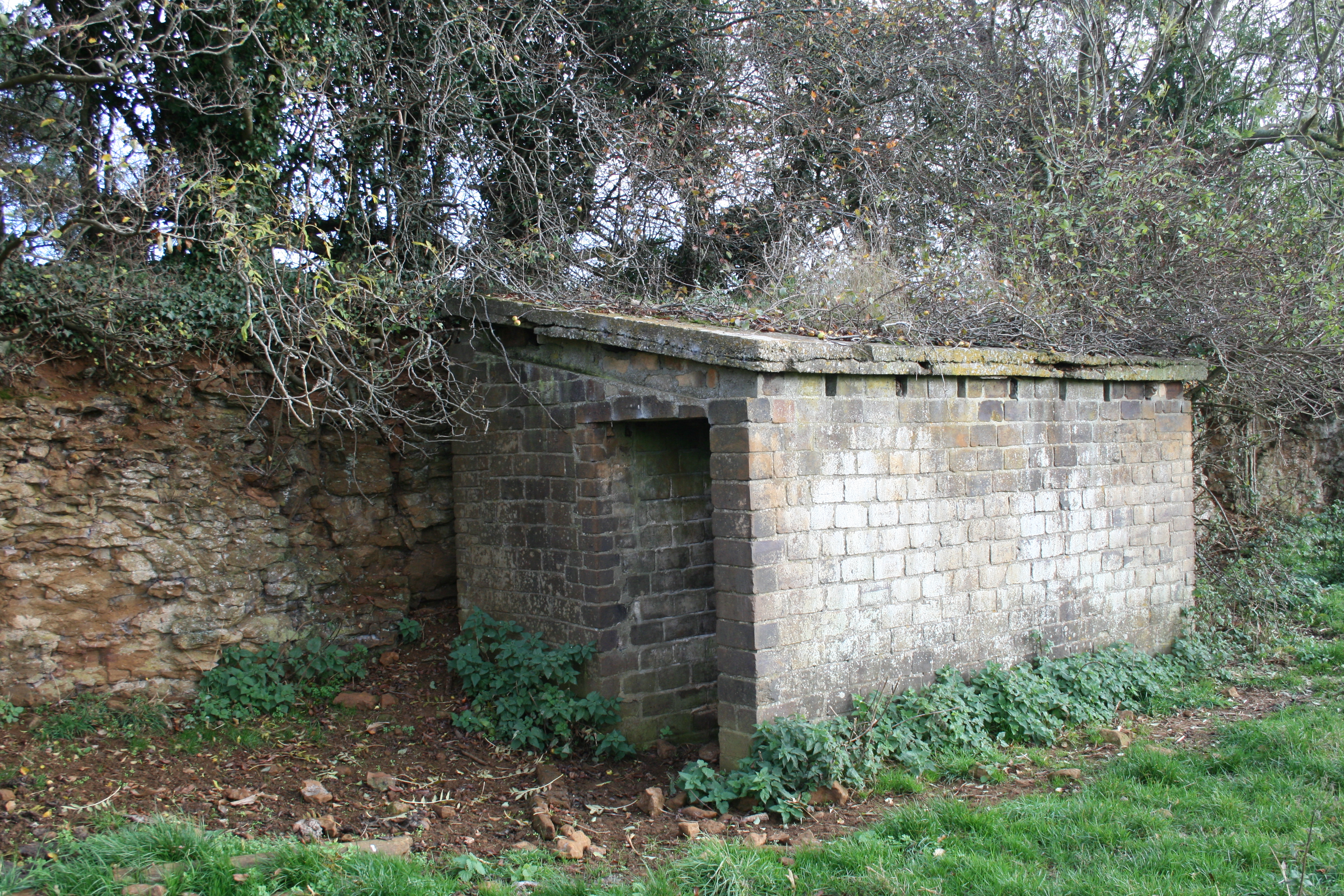
Explosives store, Redlands Quarry.

== See also ==
- British industrial narrow gauge railways
- Hook Norton ironstone quarries (Baker)

== Bibliography ==
- "Brymbo Steel Company – Brymbo Ironstone, Hook Norton". Archive.org. Narrow Gauge Railway Museum.
- Tonks, Eric (1988). The Ironstone Quarries of the Midlands: History, Operation and Railways. Part II the Oxfordshire Field. Cheltenham: Runpast Publishing. ISBN 1-870754-02-6.
- Ingham, Paul (2000). Two Foot gauge Rails to the Ironstone. Garndolbenmaen: RCL Publications. ISBN 0-9538763-0-6.
