= Lloyd Sabin =

English cricketer

Personal information
- Full name: Lloyd Michael Sabin
- Born: 22 June 1994 (age 32); Banbury, Oxfordshire, England
- Batting: Right-handed
- Bowling: Right-arm off break

Domestic team information
- Years: Team
- 2010–2017: Oxfordshire
- 2013–2015: Oxford UCCE/MCCU

Career statistics
| Competition | First-class |
|---|---|
| Matches | 6 |
| Runs scored | 190 |
| Batting average | 17.27 |
| 100s/50s | –/1 |
| Top score | 50 |
| Balls bowled | 6 |
| Wickets | 0 |
| Bowling average | – |
| 5 wickets in innings | – |
| 10 wickets in match | – |
| Best bowling | – |
| Catches/stumpings | 2/– |
- Source: Cricinfo, 24 June 2019

Lloyd Michael Sabin was born on 22 June 1994 in Banbury, Oxfordshire, and is an English former first-class cricketer.

He was educated at both The Warriner School in Bloxham and Chipping Norton School, before going up to Oxford Brookes University. While studying at Oxford Brookes he played first-class cricket for Oxford MCCU from 2013 to 2015, making six appearances. He scored 190 runs at an average of 17.27 across his six matches, with a high score of 50.

In addition to playing first-class cricket, Sabin also played minor counties cricket for Oxfordshire between 2009 and 2013, making 38 appearances in the Minor Counties Championship, alongside 27 and two appearances in the MCCA Knockout Trophy and Minor Counties Twenty20, respectively.
