= Unity Mitford =

English devotee of Adolf Hitler (1914–1948)

The Honourable Unity Mitford
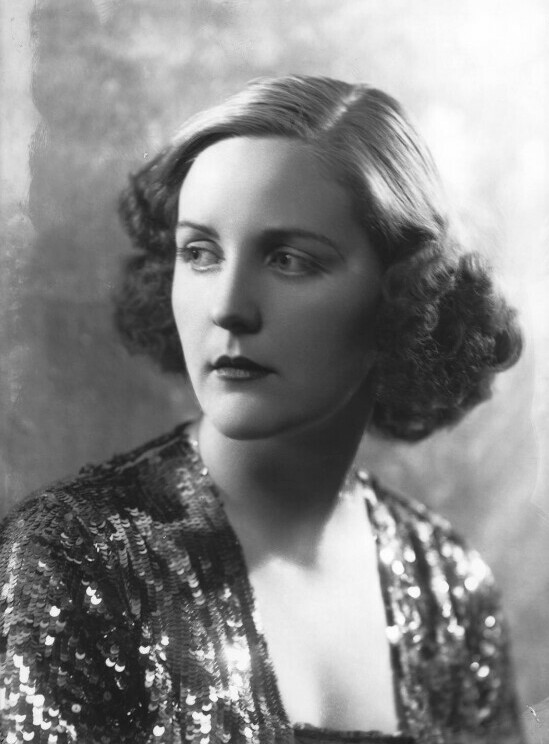
- Mitford in 1937
- Born: Unity Valkyrie Freeman-Mitford; 8 August 1914; London, England, United Kingdom
- Died: 28 May 1948 (aged 33); Oban, Scotland, United Kingdom
- Cause of death: Meningitis caused by a suicide attempt
- Resting place: Swinbrook Churchyard
- Political party: British Union of Fascists
- Parents: David Freeman-Mitford, 2nd Baron Redesdale; Sydney Bowles
- Relatives: See Mitford family

Unity Valkyrie Freeman-Mitford (8 August 1914 – 28 May 1948) was a British fascist and aristocrat known for her relationship with Adolf Hitler. Born in the United Kingdom, she belonged to Hitler's inner circle of friends and was a prominent supporter of Nazism, fascism and antisemitism.

Unity was one of the Mitford sisters, six girls born to David Freeman-Mitford, 2nd Baron Redesdale and his wife Sydney Bowles (1880–1963), namely Nancy (born 1904), Pamela (1907), Diana (1910), Unity (1914), Jessica (1917) and Deborah (1920). The sisters had one brother, Tom (born 1909) who was killed in action in 1945.

Unity was in Munich when the United Kingdom declared war on Germany, whereupon she attempted suicide by shooting herself in the head, inflicting extensive brain damage. She was returned to England but never recovered, ultimately dying in 1948 from consequences of the wound.

== Early life ==
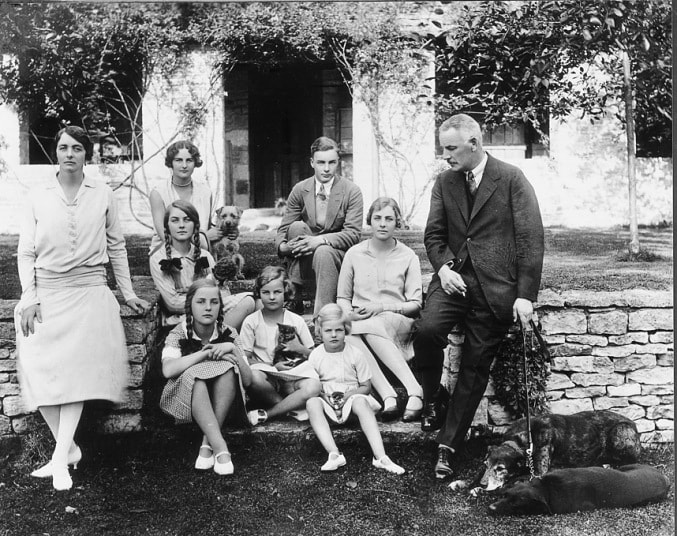
The Mitford family in 1928

The Mitford family is an aristocratic family tracing its origins in Northumberland back to the 11th-century Norman settlement of England. Unity Mitford was the fifth of seven children born in Kensington, London, to David Freeman-Mitford, 2nd Baron Redesdale, and his wife, Sydney, daughter of Thomas Gibson Bowles, known to the children as Farve and Muv. Unity was a first cousin once removed of Winston Churchill's wife Clementine Churchill.

Mitford was, coincidentally considering her later beliefs, conceived in the town of Swastika, Ontario, Canada, where her family had gold mines. The Mitford children lived at Asthall Manor in Asthall, Oxfordshire. Unity was educated at home by governesses, then attended Trinity Congregation Church and was educated at Oakdene private school in Beaconsfield, Buckinghamshire and St Margaret's School in Bushey, Hertfordshire. She was nicknamed "Boud" by her siblings.

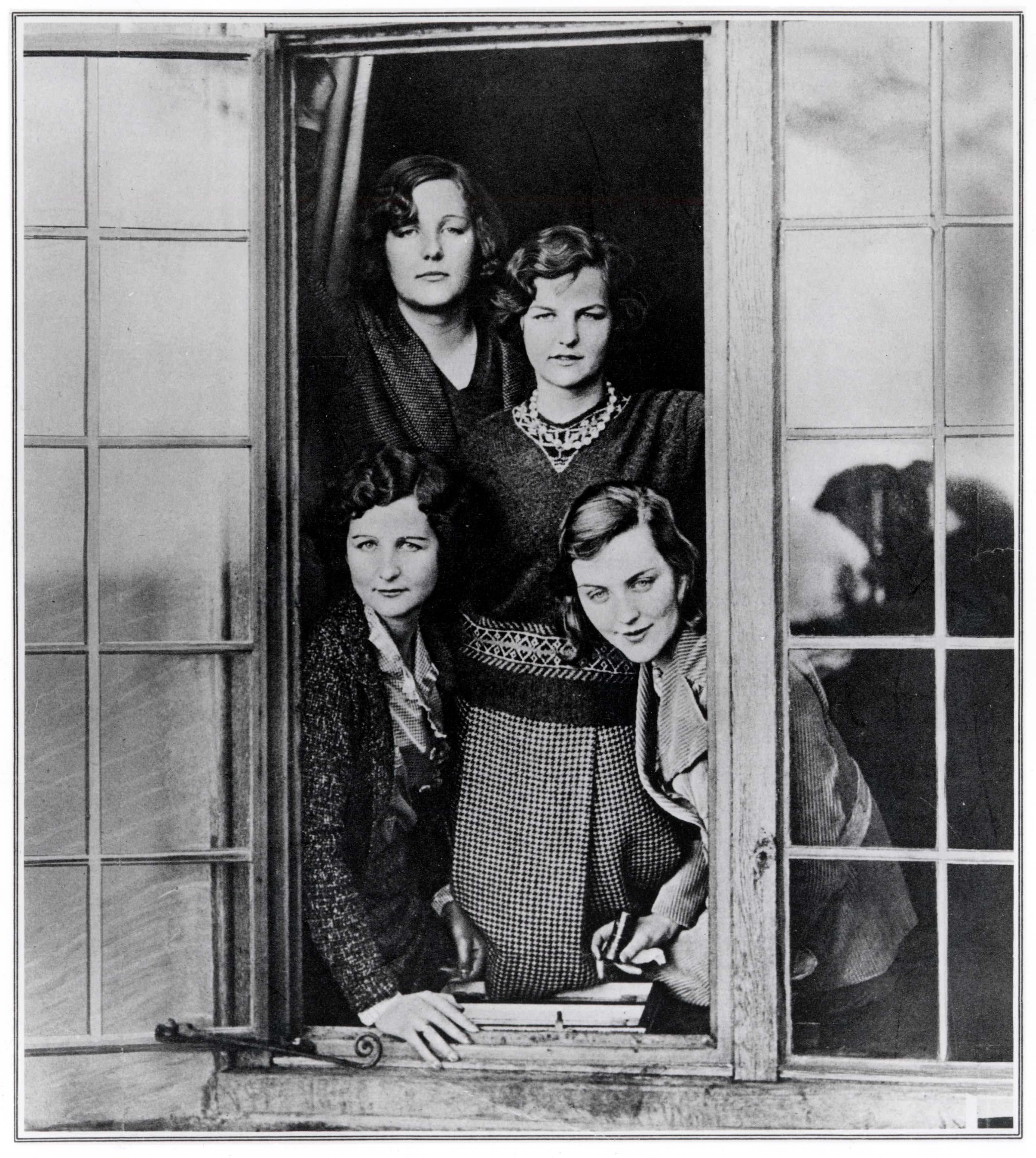
Nancy, Diana, Unity and Jessica Mitford on the cover of Sketch magazine in 1932

As a young girl, Unity was described by her mother as a sensitive and introverted child who would hide under the dining room table if anything was said to upset or embarrass her. As she grew older she became disruptive, and developed a tough shell of sullen defiance. Sent away to boarding school when she was fourteen, she was expelled from three schools in succession.

Diana Mosley's biographer, Jan Dalley, suggested that "Unity found life in her big family very difficult because she came after these cleverer, prettier, more accomplished sisters." Another biographer, David Pryce-Jones, said: "If you come from a ruck of children in a large family, you've got to do something to assert your individuality, and I think through the experience of trying to force her way forward among the sisters and in the family, she decided that she was going to form a personality against everything."

Unity's younger sister, Jessica, with whom as a girl she shared a bedroom, had beliefs at the opposite end of the political spectrum, later becoming a dedicated communist. The two drew a chalk line down the middle to divide the room. Jessica's side was decorated with hammer and sickles and pictures of Vladimir Lenin, while Unity's was decorated with swastikas and pictures of Adolf Hitler. Dalley commented, "They were kids virtually, you don't know how much it was just a game, a game that became deadly serious in later life."

== Social debut ==
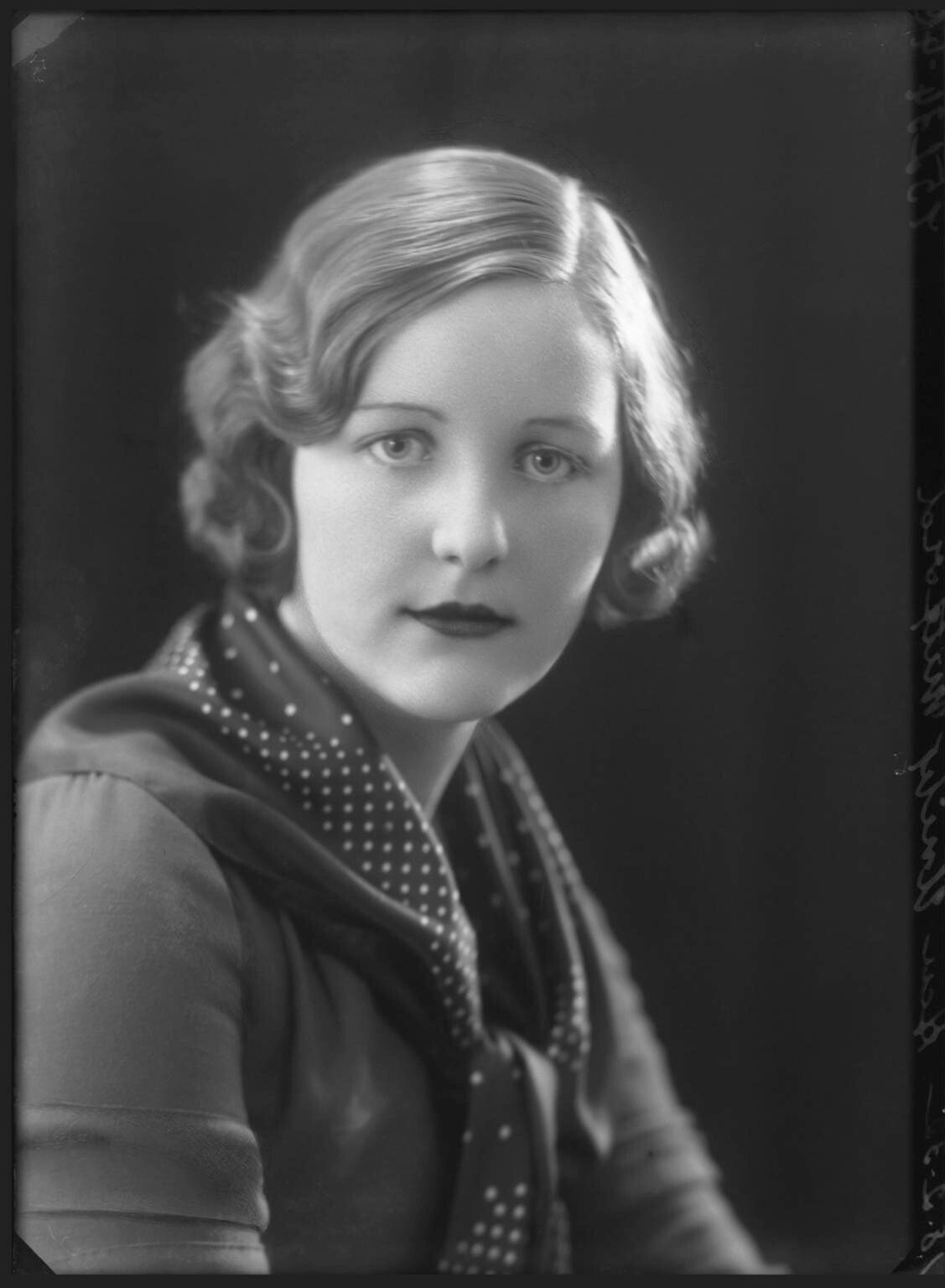
Mitford in 1932

Mitford came out as a debutante in 1932, though social events bored her and she was considered "a little eccentric by her contemporaries." At a Court ball held at Buckingham Palace, she drew attention to herself by stealing the writing paper.

The same year, her elder sister Diana left her husband Bryan Guinness to pursue an affair with Oswald Mosley, who had just founded the British Union of Fascists (BUF). Their father was furious at the disgrace and forbade any member of the family to see either Diana or "The Man Mosley", as he termed him.

Unity disobeyed and she met Mosley that summer at a party thrown by Diana, where she became an instant convert to his ideas. Mosley's son, Nicholas Mosley, recalled: "Unity became a very extrovert member of the party, which was her way ... She joined my father's party and she used to turn up, she used to go around in a black shirt uniform, and she used to turn up at communist meetings and she used to do the fascist salute and heckle the speaker. That was the sort of person she was". He added that although his father admired Unity's commitment, Mosley felt "She wasn't doing him any good, because she was making an exhibition of herself." A friend of Unity, Claud Phillimore, said that Unity "had quite a masculine streak in her. She would go off to BUF meetings in Oxford, donning her black shirt which couldn't be taken seriously. She enjoyed doing it to provoke." She also wore a Nazi armband on her BUF uniform.

Unity, Tom and Diana Mitford travelled to Germany, as part of the British delegation from the BUF to the 1933 Nuremberg Rally, seeing Hitler for the first time. Mitford later said, "The first time I saw him I knew there was no one I would rather meet." Biographer Anne de Courcy confirms: "The Nuremberg rally had a profound effect on both Diana and Unity. ... Unity was already, as it were, convinced about Hitler, but this turned conviction into worship. From then on, she wanted to be near Hitler as much as possible".

== Arrival in Germany ==
Mitford returned to Germany in mid-1934, aged 19, enrolling in a language school in Munich close to the Nazi Party headquarters. Dalley notes "She was obsessed with meeting Hitler, so she really set out to stalk him." Pryce Jones elaborates:

She set her mind on getting Hitler, and she discovered that Hitler's movements could be ascertained. It's one of the extraordinary things about Hitler's daily life that he was so available to the public. You knew which café he'd be in, you knew which restaurant he'd be in, which hotel, and he would just go and meet people over sticky buns and cakes, and it was possible to meet him like that. And he was in the habit of eating in the Osteria Bavaria in Munich and she started sitting in the Osteria Bavaria every day. So he would have to come into the front part of the restaurant where there was this English girl.

After ten months, Hitler finally invited Mitford to his table at Osteria Bavaria, where they talked for over 30 minutes, with Hitler picking up her bill. In a letter home to her father, Mitford wrote that: "It was the most wonderful and beautiful [day] of my life. I am so happy that I wouldn't mind a bit, dying. I'd suppose I am the luckiest girl in the world. For me he is the greatest man of all time." She also wrote of an encounter with Hitler in her diary: "'Lunch Osteria 2.30. THE FUHRER comes 3.15 after I have finished lunch. After about ten minutes he sends the Wirt [owner] TO ASK ME TO GO TO HIS TABLE." Hitler became smitten with the young blonde British student, the embodiment of the Nazi ideal of "Aryan" womanhood. He was also struck by her curious connections to Germanic culture, including her middle name, Valkyrie. She was invited to sit by Hitler at dinner parties, film screenings and Nuremberg rallies. He was known to hold her hand and stroke her hair while she sat at his feet, but scholars had stated that Mitford "probably never had intimate sexual relations with Hitler".

Mitford's grandfather, Bertram Freeman-Mitford, had been a friend of Richard Wagner, one of Hitler's idols, and had written introductions to two works of Houston Stewart Chamberlain. Dalley says, "Hitler was extremely superstitious, and he believed that Unity was sort of sent to him, it was destined." Mitford subsequently received invitations to party rallies and state occasions and was described by Hitler as "a perfect specimen of Aryan womanhood".

Hitler and Mitford became close, with Hitler reportedly playing Mitford off against his new girlfriend, Eva Braun, apparently to make her jealous. Braun wrote of Mitford in her diary: "She is known as the Valkyrie and looks the part, including her legs. I the mistress of the greatest man in Germany and the whole world, I sit here waiting while the sun mocks me through the window panes." Braun regained Hitler's attention after an attempted suicide and Mitford learned from this that desperate measures were often needed to capture the Führer's attention. During this period, Mitford was also courted by Nazi supporter Count János Almásy, who supposedly could not understand why she rejected his advances.

Mitford attended the Hitler Youth festival in Hesselberg with Hitler's friend Julius Streicher, where she gave a virulently anti-semitic speech. She subsequently repeated these sentiments in an open letter to Streicher's paper, Der Stürmer, which read: "The English have no notion of the Jewish danger. Our worst Jews work only behind the scenes. We think with joy of the day when we will be able to say England for the English! Out with the Jews! Heil Hitler! P.S. please publish my name in full, I want everyone to know I am a Jew hater." Hitler rewarded her with an engraved golden swastika badge, a private box at the 1936 Berlin Olympics, and a ride in a party Mercedes to the Bayreuth Festival. "Fascist tourism" to Germany and Italy also became popular among British women rank and file members of the fascist movement, following Unity's example.

== Inside the inner circle ==
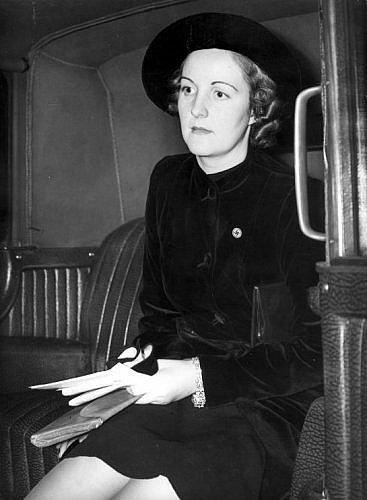
Mitford in London in 1938, wearing a Nazi party badge

From this point on, Mitford was inducted into Hitler's inner circle, and remained with him for five years. When Hitler announced the Anschluss in 1938, she appeared with him on the balcony in Vienna. She was later arrested in Prague for distributing Nazi propaganda. Pryce Jones reports that "She [Mitford] saw him, it seemed, more than a hundred times, no other English person could have anything like that access to Hitler", and the suspicions of the British SIS were aroused.

MI5 officer Guy Liddell wrote in his diary: "Unity Mitford had been in close and intimate contact with the Führer and his supporters for several years, and was an ardent and open supporter of the Nazi regime. She had remained behind after the outbreak of war and her action had come perilously close to high treason." A 1936 report went further, proclaiming her "more Nazi than the Nazis", and stated that she gave the Hitler salute to the British Consul General in Munich, who immediately requested that her passport be impounded. In 1938, Hitler gave her a choice of four apartments in Munich.

Immediately prior to this, Mitford had lived in the house of Erna Hanfstaengl, sister of early Hitler admirer and confidant Ernst Hanfstaengl, but was ordered to leave when Hitler became angry with the Hanfstaengls. In the summer of 1939, Hitler arranged for a Jewish couple to be dispossessed from their apartment in Munich so that Mitford could move in. Mitford is reported to have visited to discuss her decoration and design plans, while the soon-to-be-dispossessed residents sat in the kitchen crying. On June 5 Unity wrote to her sister Diana that she had found an apartment which belonged to a "'young Jewish couple who are going abroad'". According to Mary S. Lovell's book The Sisters, Unity saw the couple and "apparently amicably" purchased some furniture from them.

Many prominent Nazis were also suspicious of Mitford and her relationship to their Führer. In his memoirs, Inside the Third Reich, Albert Speer said of Hitler's select group: "One tacit agreement prevailed: No one must mention politics. The sole exception was Lady [sic] Mitford, who even in the later years of international tension persistently spoke up for her country and often actually pleaded with Hitler to make a deal with Britain. In spite of Hitler's discouraging reserve, she did not abandon her efforts through all those years". Mitford summered at the Berghof where she continued to discuss a possible German–British alliance with Hitler, going so far as to supply lists of potential supporters and enemies. Mitford was at Berghof while the Hitler-Schuschnigg meeting took place in February 1938.

Mitford was not the only woman who was vying for Hitler's attention: there was also the Austrian aristocrat Stephanie von Hohenlohe. Mitford developed a great dislike of von Hohenlohe and a jealousy of her closeness to Hitler. Mitford tried to share her suspicions with Hitler that von Hohenlohe was a double agent and questioning why he would keep someone of suspected Jewish origin around him. Hitler, despite Mitford's warnings, did not act on them.

On 29 March 1939, Mitford wrote in a letter to her sister Diana: "I had lunch with the Führer on Sunday and Monday, and he asked me to send you viele Grüsse [many greetings]. Both days he was in his very sweetest mood, particularly on Monday, he held my hand most of the time and looked sweet and said 'Kind' [child] in his sympathetic way because he was so sorry about England and Germany being such enemies. However he said nothing but wonderful things about England and he completely gave me faith again that it will all come right in the end."

At the 1939 Bayreuth Festival, Hitler warned Unity and her sister Diana that war with Britain was inevitable within weeks and they should return home. Diana returned to England, while Unity chose to remain in Germany, though her family sent pleas for her to come home. After Britain's declaration of war on Germany on 3 September 1939, Unity was distraught. Diana told an interviewer in 1999: "She told me that if there was a war, which of course we all terribly hoped there might not be, that she would kill herself because she couldn't bear to live and see these two countries tearing each other to pieces, both of which she loved."

On the morning of 3 September, she visited the Gauleiter Adolf Wagner to inquire if she would be detained as an enemy alien, receiving assurances from Wagner that she would not. He was concerned by her demeanour and assigned two men to follow her, but she managed to shake them off by the time she entered the English Garden in Munich, where she took a pearl-handled pistol given to her by Hitler for protection and shot herself in the head. She survived, though badly injured, and was hospitalised in Munich, where Hitler frequently visited her. He paid her bills and arranged for her return home.

== Return to Britain ==
In December 1939, Mitford was moved to a hospital in Bern in neutral Switzerland, where her mother and youngest sister, Deborah, went to pick her up. In a 2002 letter to The Guardian, Deborah relates the experience: "We were not prepared for what we found – the person lying in bed was desperately ill. She had lost 2 stone [28 pounds; 13 kilograms], was all huge eyes and matted hair, untouched since the bullet went through her skull. The bullet was still in her head, inoperable the doctor said. She could not walk, talked with difficulty and was a changed personality, like one who had had a stroke. Not only was her appearance shocking, she was a stranger, someone we did not know. We brought her back to England in an ambulance coach attached to a train. Every jolt was agony to her."

Stating she could remember nothing of the incident, Mitford returned to England with her mother and sister in January 1940 amid a flurry of press interest and her comment, "I'm glad to be in England, even if I'm not on your side", led to public calls for her internment as a traitor. At the same time, rumours about her fate swirled on the continent. In January 1940, Friedrich Reck-Malleczewen, an anti-Nazi German aristocrat, wrote in his diary that Mitford was "taken back to London, [where] she was more successful with poison and died there."

Mitford survived her initial convalescence. Due to the intervention by Home Secretary John Anderson, at the behest of her father, she was left to live out her days with her mother at the family home at Swinbrook, Oxfordshire. Under the care of Professor Hugh Cairns, neurosurgeon at the Nuffield Hospital in Oxford, "She learned to walk again, but never fully recovered. She was incontinent and childish." Doctors decided that it was too dangerous to remove the bullet in her head. Her mental age was likened to that of a 10-year-old, or a "sophisticated child" as James Lees-Milne called her, although he continues that she was "still very amusing in that Mitford manner". She had a tendency to talk incessantly, had trouble concentrating her mind, and showed an unusually large appetite with sloppy table manners. Lees-Milne observed her to be "rather plain and fat, and says she weighs 13 1/2 stone [189 pounds; 86 kilograms]". She retained at least some of her devotion to the Nazi party. Her family friend Billa Harrod recalled Unity stating that she wished to have children and name the eldest Adolf.

Mitford was reported to have had an affair with RAF Pilot Officer John Andrews, a test pilot, who was stationed at the nearby RAF Brize Norton, up to 11 September 1941. MI5 learned of this and reported it to Home Secretary Herbert Morrison in October. He had heard that she "drives about the countryside … and picks up airmen, etc, and … interrogates them." Andrews, a former bank clerk and a married father, was "removed as far away as the limited extent of the British Isles permits." He was re-posted to the far north of Scotland, where he died in a Spitfire crash in 1945. Authorities then concluded that Mitford did not pose a significant threat.

From 1943, she also spent long periods in Hillmorton, an area of Rugby in Warwickshire, staying with the local vicar and his family. She also spent time on the Scottish island of Inch Kenneth, where she wrote that when she died: "Make sure that I go to heaven and sit there with the Fuhrer for ever and ever. Let all his enemies be smitten down especially the jews which will serve them all right."

Mitford was keen to visit her sister Diana in HM Holloway Prison, and Norah Elam offered to look after Mitford at their home in Logan Place for a short period. Elam and her husband Dudley escorted Mitford to see Diana and Oswald Mosley in Holloway on 18 March 1943.

== Death ==
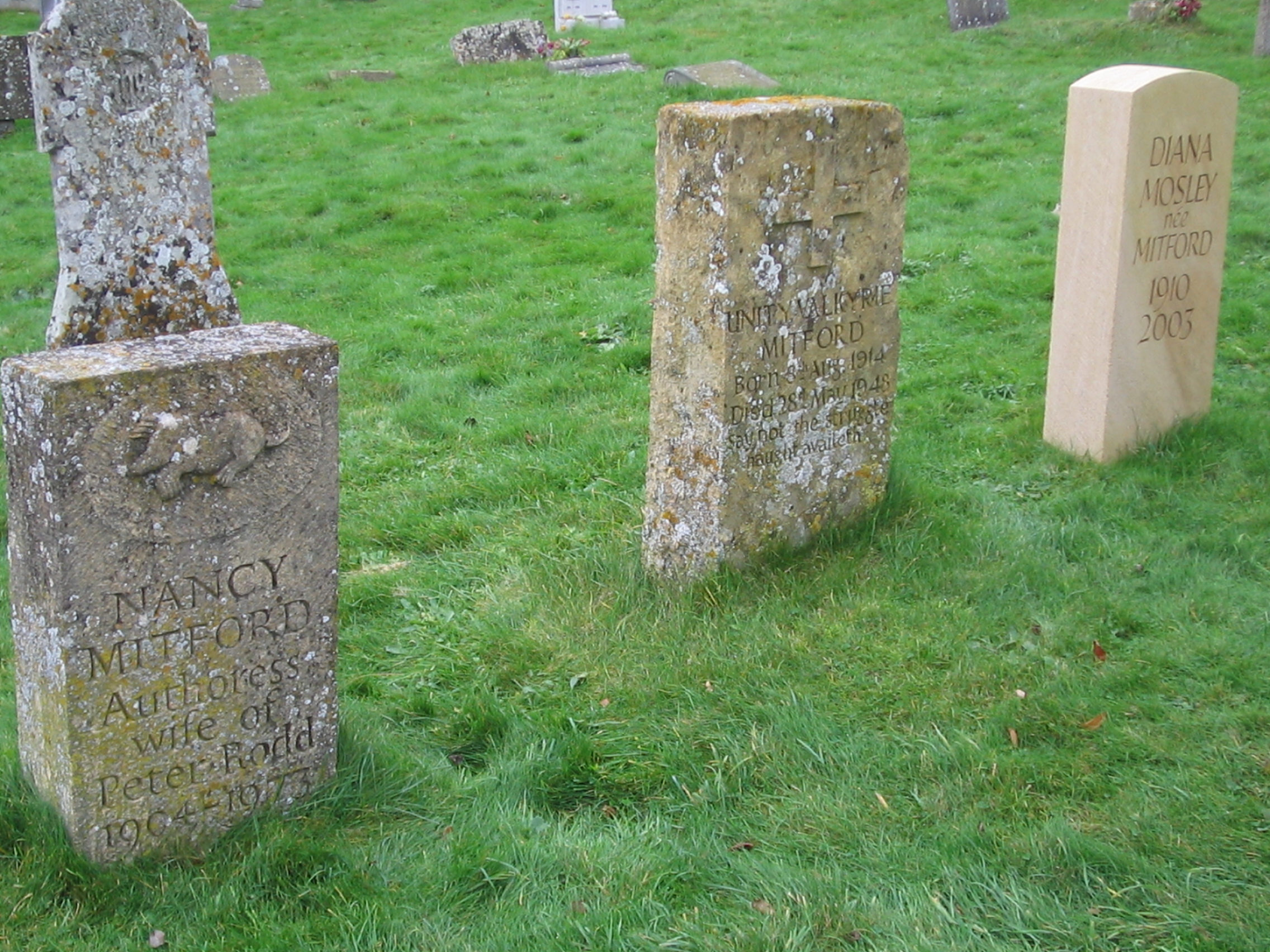
Mitford's grave, between sisters Nancy (left) and Diana (right)

Mitford was taken seriously ill on a visit to the family owned island of Inch Kenneth and was taken to hospital in Oban. On 28 May 1948, 33-year-old Mitford died of meningitis caused by the cerebral swelling around the bullet, which was still in her head. She was buried at Swinbrook Churchyard; the inscription on her gravestone reads: "Say not the struggle naught availeth."

The house on Inch Kenneth, formerly owned by the Mitfords, where Unity Mitford became ill

== Publication of diaries ==
In 2025, diaries believed to be Mitford's were discovered. They document a fascination with Hitler, whom she stalked when she was moved to Munich aged 20. The diaries record 139 meetings with Hitler up to 1 September 1939. They also record how she learnt how to shoot a pistol as "I am practising to kill Jews."

== Controversies ==
=== Allegations of a faked shooting ===
On 1 December 2002, following the release of declassified documents (including the diary of wartime MI5 officer Guy Liddell), investigative journalist Martin Bright published an article in The Observer saying that Home Secretary John Anderson had intervened to prevent Mitford being questioned on her return from Germany. He also said that the shooting, which "has become part of the Mitford myth", may have been invented to excuse this.

Bright cites the statements of press photographers and others who witnessed Mitford's 3 January 1940, return to Britain that "there were no outward signs of her injury." Liddell had written on 2 January, "We had no evidence to support the press allegations that she was in a serious state of health, and it might well be that she was brought in on a stretcher in order to avoid publicity and unpleasantness to her family." Liddell had wanted her and her entourage, which according to Bright included known Nazi supporters, to be searched upon arrival, but the Home Secretary prevented this. On 8 January, Liddell notes receiving a report from the Security Control Officers who were responsible for meeting the arrivals that states "there were no signs of a bullet wound."

Mitford's cousin, Rupert Mitford, 6th Baron Redesdale, replied to the accusations by saying, "I love conspiracy theories but it goes a little far to suggest Unity was faking it. But people did wonder how she was up on her feet so soon after shooting herself in the head." Unity's sister Deborah rebutted such comments, stating that the entourage that returned with Unity consisted of herself and their mother and although she could not remember them being searched upon return, that Unity "could not walk, talked with difficulty and was a changed personality, like one who had had a stroke". She also stated that she had detailed records from Professor Cairns, neurosurgeon at the Nuffield Hospital in Oxford, on Unity's condition, including X-rays showing the bullet. In a 2007 article for New Statesman, Bright states, "In fact, Liddell was wrong about her injuries. She had indeed shot herself and later died of an infection caused by the bullet in the brain."

=== Rumours of Hitler's baby ===
In December 2007, Bright published an article in New Statesman stating that following a previous article on Unity Mitford, he had received a phone call from a Ms Val Hann, a member of the public, offering new information on the story. The caller said that during the war, her aunt, Betty Norton, had run Hill View Cottage, a private maternity hospital in Oxford where Mitford had been a client. According to Hann's family legend, passed from Betty to Val's mother and then on to Val herself, Mitford had checked into the hospital after her return to England where she had given birth to Hitler's child, who was subsequently placed for adoption. Bright states he was initially sceptical.

Bright travelled to Wigginton where the current owner of Hill View confirmed that Norton had indeed run the cottage as a maternity hospital during the war. Bright met with elderly village resident Audrey Smith, whose sister had worked at Hill View. She confirmed seeing "Unity wrapped in a blanket and looking very ill" but insisted that she was there to recover from a nervous breakdown and not to give birth.

Bright contacted Unity's sister Deborah who denounced the villager's gossip and claimed she could produce her mother's diaries to prove it. Bright returned to the National Archives where he found a file on Unity sealed under the 100-year rule. He received special permission to open it and discovered that in October 1941, while living at the family home in Swinbrook, she had been consorting with a married RAF test pilot – throwing doubt on her reported invalidity.

Bright then abandoned the investigation, until he mentioned the story to an executive from Channel 4 who thought it was a good subject for a documentary film. Further investigation was then undertaken as part of the filming for Hitler's British Girl. This included a visit to an Oxfordshire register office, showing a large number of birth registrations at Hill View at that time, apparently confirming its use as a maternity hospital. No records were found for Mitford, although the records officer stated many births were not registered at this time. The publication of the article and the broadcast of the film the following week stimulated media speculation that Hitler's child could be living in the United Kingdom.

== In popular culture ==
Unity, a play by John Mortimer depicting Mitford's time in Berlin, was broadcast on BBC2 on 20 March 1981. Unity was played by Lesley-Anne Down.

Mitford is mentioned in the 1958 novella Breakfast at Tiffany's by Truman Capote. Rutherford ("Rusty") Trawler apparently was supposed to propose to Unity Mitford before the war, if Hitler had not.

Mitford is portrayed by Shannon Watson in the 2025 historical drama series Outrageous.

Mitford's connection with Adolf Hitler is the main subject of the novel Resolution by Adam Zerny.

== See also ==
- The Mitfords: Letters Between Six Sisters
