= Hook Norton =

Village in Oxfordshire, England

Coordinates: 52.00°N 1.48°W

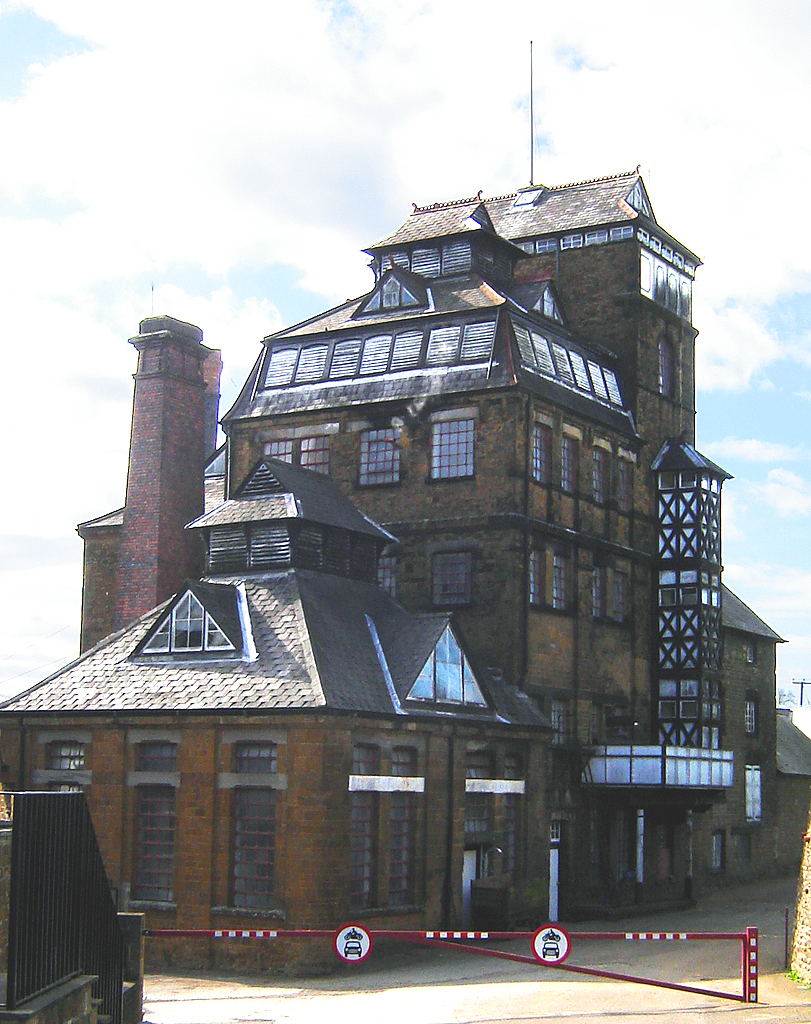
- Hook Norton brewery is one of Britain's last working Victorian tower breweries

- Location within Oxfordshire
- Area: 22.23 km^{2} (8.58 sq mi)
- Population: 2,117 (2011 Census)
  - Density: 95/km^{2} (250/sq mi)
- OS grid reference: SP3533
- Civil parish: Hook Norton
- District: Cherwell
- Shire county: Oxfordshire
- Region: South East
- Country: England
- Sovereign state: United Kingdom
- Post town: Banbury
- Postcode district: OX15
- Dialling code: 01608
- Police: Thames Valley
- Fire: Oxfordshire
- Ambulance: South Central
- UK Parliament: Banbury

Hook Norton is a village and civil parish in Oxfordshire, England. It lies 4 1/2 miles (7 km) northeast of Chipping Norton, close to the Cotswold Hills. The 2011 Census recorded the parish's population as 2,117. The village is formed of four neighbourhoods: East End, Scotland End (in the west), Down End (in the centre) and Southrop (in the south).

== Toponymy ==
In the Anglo-Saxon Chronicle in 917 the village is recorded as Hocneratun. The Domesday Book of 1086 records it as Hochenartone. A charter from 1130 records it as Hokenartona. An episcopal register entry from 1225 records it as Hokenartone. A record from 1267 records it as Hokenarton. The Taxatio Ecclesiastica of 1291 records it as Hoke Norton. Other past spellings of the name include Hocceneretune (1050), Hogenarton (1216) and Okenardton (1263). Hegnorton is recorded in a plea roll from 1430. The name is derived from Old English. Hocca may perhaps be the name of a person or tribe, although other interpretations are possible; ōra may refer to a hill slope and tūn is a settlement. Today the village is colloquially known to its inhabitants as "Hooky" and sometimes as "The Hook".

== History ==
The Anglo-Saxon Chronicle records that a Viking army from Northampton raided the Hook Norton area in 913. The village had a parish church by 922. The Domesday Book records that in 1086 Hook Norton had 76 villagers and two mills. Leland noted c.1540 the existence of a deer park at Hook Norton which was owned by the king, Henry VIII. The park had previously belonged to a Chaucer and Charles Brandon, 1st Duke of Suffolk. By the 1800s it was "an ancient park, long-disused and forgotten."

Hook Norton had a clockmaker, Thomas Webb, who maintained the turret clock at St. Giles' parish church, Wigginton from 1788 until 1834. Webb was succeeded in his trade at Hook Norton by John Paine, who maintained the clock at Wigginton from 1835 until 1855. In 1840 Paine built a new turret clock for St. George's parish church, Brailes, Warwickshire.

The former Banbury and Cheltenham Direct Railway, part of the Great Western Railway, served Hook Norton with a railway station at East End. British Railways closed the station in 1951 and closed the railway to all traffic in 1964. Tall stone pillars which supported two B&CDR viaducts can be seen in the valley to the south-east of the village. Near Hook Norton there were several ironstone quarries, evidence of which can still be seen. The Brymbo Ironworks, opened in 1899, had its own narrow gauge railway and was connected to the B&CDR at Council Hill Sidings, 3/4 mile (1.2 km) east of Hook Norton station. The Brymbo Ironworks closed in 1946 and was dismantled in 1948.

Hook Norton Brewery was founded in 1849 and is an important architectural example of a Victorian tower brewery, as well as containing a working Victorian steam engine. The village's 18th century hand-pumped fire engine, which was in use until 1896, is preserved in St. Peter's parish church.

== Churches ==
The present Church of England parish church of Saint Peter is of Norman origin but also has Early English, Decorated Gothic and Perpendicular Gothic features. The Norman font is 11th century and is unusual in featuring pagan signs of the Zodiac. St. Peter's contains a number of wall paintings including saints, angels and the Apostles Saint Peter and Saint Paul. The church tower has a ring of eight bells, all cast in 1949 by John Taylor & Co of Loughborough. St Peter's is now the mother church of the Benefice of Hook Norton with Great Rollright, Swerford and Wigginton. Hook Norton Baptist Church is among the oldest in Britain, having been founded 1640. Its present building is Georgian, built in 1781. Hook Norton also had a Methodist chapel, which was built in 1875.

== Amenities ==
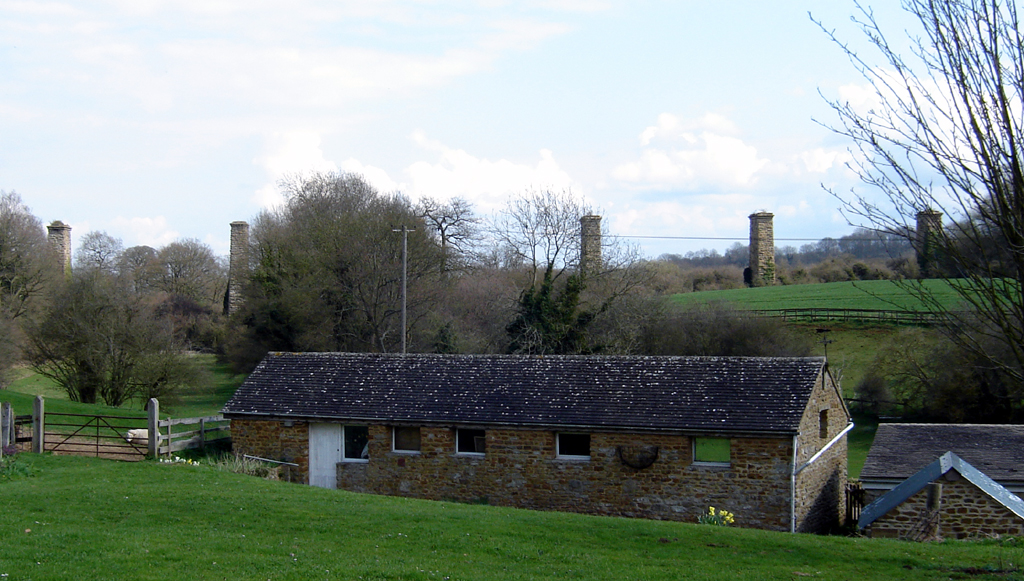
Railway viaduct piers to the south-east of Hook Norton. (April 2006)

Hook Norton has a Church of England primary school, fire station, GPs' surgery, dental practice, public library, village hall, Women's Institute and club. Its secondary school, Hook Norton Secondary School, was closed in 1971, as part of changes to educational provision in Banbury. Half the pupils transferred to The Warriner School in Bloxham, and the others to Chipping Norton Comprehensive School.

Hook Norton's public houses, The Pear Tree Inn, and The Sun Inn, belong to Hook Norton Brewery.

== Sport and leisure ==
Hook Norton F.C. plays in the Witney and District Division 2. Hook Norton Cricket Club plays in Oxfordshire Cricket Association Division One. Hook Norton also has a tennis club, a running club and a Multi Use Games Area.

== Sources and further reading ==
- Beeson, CFC (1989) [1962]. Simcock, AV (ed.). Clockmaking in Oxfordshire 1400–1850 (3rd ed.). Oxford: Museum of the History of Science. pp. 42, 88, 132, 149, 173, 188, 190. ISBN 0-903364-06-9.
- Blair, John (1986). "Hook Norton, regia villa". Oxoniensia. LI. Oxfordshire Architectural and Historical Society: 63–67. ISSN 0308-5562.
- Dickens, Margaret (1928). History of Hook Norton 912–1928. Banbury: Banbury Guardian.
- Ekwall, Eilert (1960) [1936]. Concise Oxford Dictionary of English Place-Names (4th ed.). Oxford: Oxford University Press. Hook Norton. ISBN 0198691033.
- Sherwood, Jennifer; Pevsner, Nikolaus (1974). The Buildings of England: Oxfordshire. Harmondsworth: Penguin Books. pp. 651–652. ISBN 0-14-071045-0.
