= Wigginton, Oxfordshire =

Village in Oxfordshire, England

Coordinates: 51.997°N 1.435°W

Wigginton
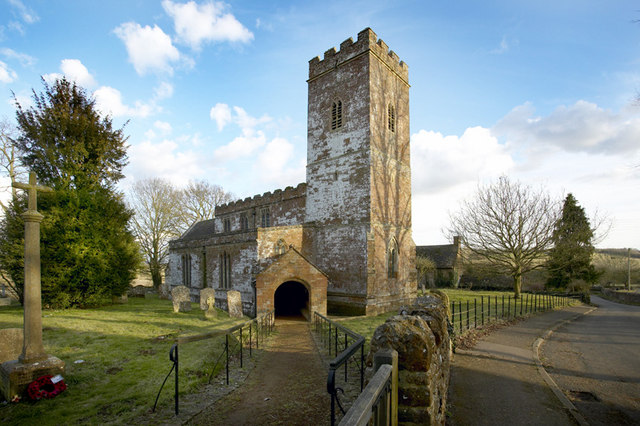
- St Giles' parish church

- Location within Oxfordshire
- Area: 4.80 km^{2} (1.85 sq mi)
- Population: 194 (2011 census)
  - Density: 40/km^{2} (100/sq mi)
- OS grid reference: SP3833
- Civil parish: Wigginton
- District: Cherwell
- Shire county: Oxfordshire
- Region: South East
- Country: England
- Sovereign state: United Kingdom
- Post town: Banbury
- Postcode district: OX15
- Dialling code: 01608
- Police: Thames Valley
- Fire: Oxfordshire
- Ambulance: South Central
- UK Parliament: Banbury
- Website: Parish of Wigginton Oxfordshire

Wigginton is a village and civil parish about 6 miles (10 km) southwest of Banbury in Oxfordshire. The village is beside the River Swere, which forms the southern boundary of the parish. A Channel Four documentary, Hitler's British Girl, investigated the possibility that Unity Mitford gave birth to the son of Adolf Hitler in Hill View Cottage, Wigginton.

== Archaeology ==
About 300 metres (330 yd) northeast of the parish church is the site of an Iron Age enclosure, on which a large Roman villa was added in about the 2nd century AD. The occupied part of the villa seems to have been reduced in size in the 4th century AD. The site is a scheduled monument.

== Parish church ==
The nave and north and south aisles of the Church of England parish church of Saint Giles were built late in the 13th century. The chancel is early Decorated Gothic, built in about 1300. Each aisle is linked with the nave by an arcade of three bays. The Perpendicular Gothic porch and west tower were added in the 15th or late 14th century. The nave clerestory is also a Perpendicular addition. The tower and the clerestory are crenellated. Monuments in St Giles include some early 14th century effigies in the chancel: of a recumbent knight on the north side, and of a civilian with two wives or daughters on the south.

In the late 19th century the church was restored under the direction of two Gothic Revival architects: the chancel and south aisle in 1870 under William White and the nave and north aisle in 1886 under John Loughborough Pearson. The stained glass of the east window was added in 1908. St Giles is a Grade I listed building.

The tower has a ring of six bells. Until 1998 there were only three: the treble cast by Matthew III Bagley of Chacombe, Northamptonshire in 1753, the second cast by George Mears of the Whitechapel Bell Foundry in 1859 and the tenor by Henry Bond of Burford in 1896. In 1998 the Whitechapel Bell Foundry converted this into a ring of six by retuning the treble as a tenor, recasting the 1859 and 1896 bells as new second, third, fourth and fifth bells and adding a new treble. The bells were then rehung in a new frame by White's of Appleton. St Giles' also has a Sanctus bell that was cast in about 1599.

St Giles' has an early clock. Its date is unknown but its characteristics suggest it was made early in the 17th century. The churchwardens' accounts record payments to a Samuel Bloxham for its repair from 1717 onwards, including a bill for £5 3s 0d for work in 1733–34 when Bloxham and a clockmaker called Thomas Gilks from Chipping Norton seem to have rebuilt it. St Giles' parish is now part of the Benefice of Hook Norton with Great Rollright, Swerford and Wigginton.

== Amenities ==
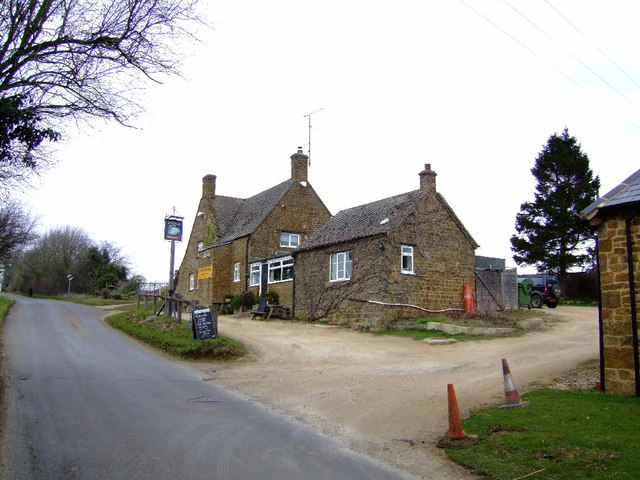
The White Swan

Wigginton previously had a public house, The White Swan, that was controlled by Hook Norton Brewery. The public house shut down during lockdown and has not been re-opened since. There is a Swerford and Wigginton Women's Institute.

== Sources and further reading ==
- Beeson, C.F.C. (1989) [1962]. Simcock, A.V. (ed.). Clockmaking in Oxfordshire 1400–1850 (3rd ed.). Oxford: Museum of the History of Science. pp. 21, 73, 173. ISBN 0-903364-06-9.
- Booth, Paul; Cameron, Esther; Crerar, Belinda (2011). "A Roman Lead 'Tank' from Wigginton, North Oxfordshire". Oxoniensia. LXXVI. Oxfordshire Architectural and Historical Society: 266–272. ISSN 0308-5562.
- Lobel, Mary D.; Crossley, Alan, eds. (1969). A History of the County of Oxford: Volume 9: Bloxham Hundred. Victoria County History. pp. 159–170.
- Sherwood, Jennifer; Pevsner, Nikolaus (1974). Oxfordshire. The Buildings of England. Harmondsworth: Penguin Books. p. 842. ISBN 0-14-071045-0.
