= Swerford Castle =

- Swerford, Oxfordshire, England
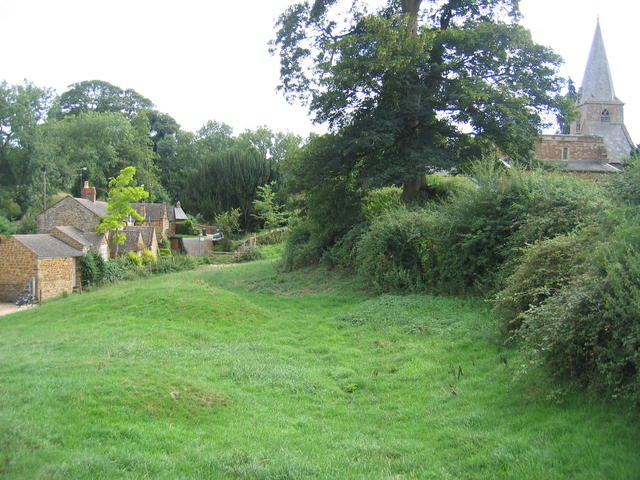
- The remaining earthworks

Site information
- Type: Motte and bailey
- Condition: Earthworks remain

Location
- Shown within Oxfordshire
- Coordinates: 51.9771°N 1.4598°W
- Grid reference: grid reference SP372311

Swerford Castle was a medieval castle in the village of Swerford, Oxfordshire, England.

== History ==
Swerford Castle was built in a motte and bailey design in the 12th century. It was positioned so as to overlook the local ford of the River Swere and the village of Swerford. Archaeological remains suggest that the castle was probably constructed during the years of the Anarchy, probably by the same family that built Ascot d'Oilly Castle.

The central motte is 18 m wide in diameter on top, and 30 m in diameter at the base, and 4 m tall; the wider bailey is approximately 52 m by 42 m, with a deep ditch. The remains today are a scheduled monument.

== See also ==
- Castles in Great Britain and Ireland
- List of castles in England
