= Swerford =

Village in Oxfordshire, England

Coordinates: 51.979°N 1.460°W

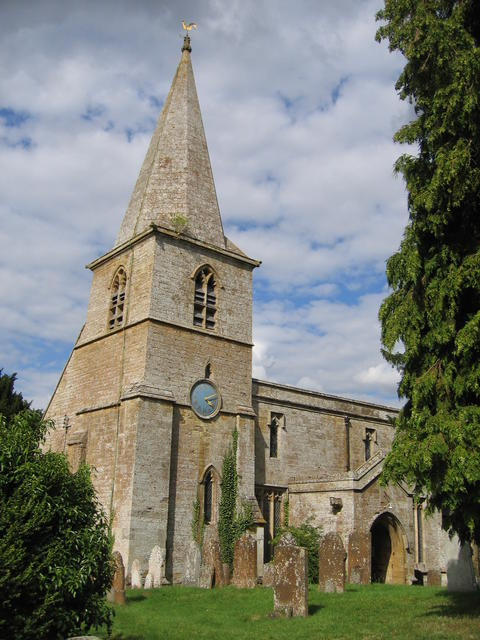
- St. Mary's parish church

- Location within Oxfordshire
- Population: 132 (2011 census)
- OS grid reference: SP3731
- Civil parish: Swerford
- District: West Oxfordshire
- Shire county: Oxfordshire
- Region: South East
- Country: England
- Sovereign state: United Kingdom
- Post town: Chipping Norton
- Postcode district: OX7
- Dialling code: 01608
- Police: Thames Valley
- Fire: Oxfordshire
- Ambulance: South Central
- UK Parliament: Banbury
- Website: Swerford Community Website

Swerford is a village and civil parish on the River Swere in the Cotswold Hills in Oxfordshire, England. It is about 4 miles (6.4 km) northeast of Chipping Norton. Swerford has two main neighbourhoods: Church End and East End. The area between them contains very few houses and is called Between Towns. The 2011 census recorded the parish's population as 132.

== Manor ==
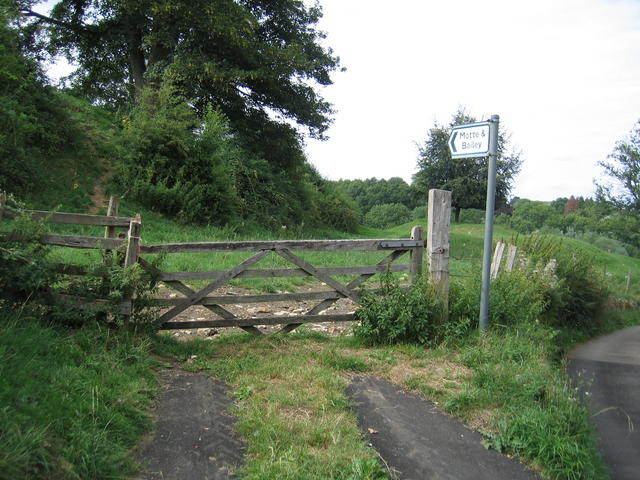
Swerford motte

The Domesday Book records that in 1086 Swerford was part of the royal manor of Hook Norton, which was held by Robert D'Oyly. The village has a motte-and-bailey castle which is believed to have been built early in the 12th century during the civil war between Empress Matilda and King Stephen. In 1783 Henry Scott, 3rd Duke of Buccleuch commissioned the building of the country house of Swerford Park as a hunting lodge. In 1820 General Sir R. Bolton, a successful army officer who was previously equerry to George IV (b.1766 - d. 1836) bought the house. Bolton commissioned the artist and architect Joseph Gandy, who remodelled the house between 1824 and 1829 in the style of Sir John Soane.

== Church and chapel ==
The Church of England parish church of Saint Mary is believed to have been founded by Osney Abbey early in the 13th century. The earliest part of St. Mary's present building is the tower and spire, which were built around 1300. The Decorated Gothic nave may have been built between 1250 and 1350. Perpendicular Gothic additions were made early in the 15th century: the chancel, and the clerestory of the nave. In 1846 the Gothic Revival architect H.J. Underwood added the north aisle. St. Mary's is now part of the Benefice of Hook Norton with Great Rollright, Swerford and Wigginton.

The church tower has a ring of six bells. William Bagley of Chacombe, Northamptonshire cast the tenor bell in 1695. Richard Sanders, who had a bellfoundry at Bromsgrove, Worcestershire and was also an itinerant bellfounder, cast the fourth bell in 1723. Matthew III Bagley of Chacombe cast the third bell in 1756 and the fifth bell in 1766. W. and J. Taylor of Loughborough cast the second bell in 1823, presumably at the foundry they ran in Oxford at that time. The Whitechapel Bell Foundry cast the present treble bell in 1998, completing the current ring of six. The vicarage was built in the 18th century. A Methodist chapel was opened in Swerford in 1938. It was closed in 1992 and is now a private house.

== Social and economic history ==
Old Clock Cottage was built in the 18th century. By 1881 a railway tunnel 418 yards (382 m) long had been built through South Hill just west of Swerford Park for the Banbury and Cheltenham Direct Railway. The railway company usually called it Hook Norton Tunnel but sometimes it is called Swerford Park Tunnel. The line's nearest railway station to Swerford was about 1 1/2 miles (2.4 km) away at Hook Norton. British Railways closed Hook Norton station in 1951 and closed the Banbury and Cheltenham railway completely in 1964. The tunnel is now bricked up at both ends to prevent access, both for people's safety and to protect any bats that may roost inside. (See Wildlife and Countryside Act 1981.)

== Amenities ==
Swerford has a village hall. The hall hosts regular village activities including a monthly market and monthly meetings of Swerford and Wigginton Women's Institute. Swerford's former public house, the Masons Arms, is now a restaurant that has been awarded a Michelin Bib Gourmand.

== Sources ==
- Sherwood, Jennifer; Pevsner, Nikolaus (1974). Oxfordshire. The Buildings of England. Harmondsworth: Penguin Books. pp. 798–799. ISBN 0-14-071045-0.
