= Hitler's British Girl =

2007 British TV documentary film

- Hitler's British Girl title card
- Genre: Documentary
- Directed by: Richard Bond
- Narrated by: Ramon Tikaram
- Composer: Sam Hooper
- Country of origin: United Kingdom
- Original language: English

Production
- Executive producer: Denys Blakeway
- Producer: Richard Bond

Original release
- Network: Channel 4
- Release: 20 December 2007

Hitler's British Girl is a Channel 4 documentary film about British Nazi sympathiser Unity Mitford and her relationship with Adolf Hitler. The film was made by following an investigation by journalist Martin Bright who alleged that she may have secretly given birth to Hitler's child.

== Production ==
The film follows the investigations of journalist Martin Bright who was contacted, after writing an article about Unity Mitford for The Observer, by a member of the public who claimed her aunt had acted as midwife when Unity gave birth to Hitler's child.

Martin's investigation is used to frame a biography of Unity given through contemporary photos and newsreel footage with commentary from prominent biographers of Unity and her family. There is also interview footage from Unity's sister Diana and Oswald Mosley's son Nicholas.

=== Participants ===
- Martin Bright, political editor of the New Statesman
- Anne de Courcy, Mitford biographer
- Jane Dalley, Mitford biographer
- David Pryce Jones, Unity Mitford biographer
- Nicholas Mosley, son of Oswald Mosley
- Val Hann, niece of Betty Norton
- Audrey Smith, Wigginton resident

== Reception ==
Gareth McLean, writing for The Guardian, recommended the film but criticised it for perpetuating the fallacy that it was only the upper class and the underclass who become enamoured of the extreme right. Sister publication The Observer joked that it was a bad week for Unity with the story of a surviving Hitler bloodline that "reads like a Nazi twist on the plot of The Da Vinci Code."

The Daily Telegraph described it as an "absorbing documentary" on Unity's suicide attempt that "unravels the reasons she did so and the murky politics of her return to England, alive, but severely brain-damaged."

Originally broadcast at 9pm on 20 December 2007 on Channel 4, the program received 2.6 million viewers (11% audience share).

== Plot summary ==
Martin Bright

The film starts with footage showing the 19-year-old Unity Mitford at the 1933 Nuremberg Rally where she is said to have become obsessed with Adolf Hitler. Unity and Hitler are said to have had a close relationship for five years and are even rumoured to have been engaged.

Newsreel footage from January 1940 shows Unity return to England from Nazi Germany in a stretcher. Contemporary newspapers speculate that her relationship with Hitler had resulted in her either poisoning herself or being shot by Hitler after a tiff. In truth she shot herself in the head on the day war was declared only to miraculously survive. There were public calls at the time for her to be interned. Recently released documents show that the head of MI5, Guy Liddell, agreed. According to the film, Unity's father persuaded Home Secretary Sir John Anderson not to do so. Furthermore, despite her having had a close relationship with Hitler, she was not even interrogated. Unity was allowed to retire quietly to the English countryside. The documentary suggests that Hill View Cottage, where she stayed, was often used as a maternity home, suggesting the possibility that she may have given birth to Hitler's baby. A niece of midwife Betty Norton is interviewed and claims that Unity had secretly given birth to a child at Hill View Cottage in Wigginton, Oxfordshire, rumoured to be the son of Hitler.

Biographers explain Unity's difficult upbringing as the younger sister of prettier, more clever, more successful sisters and her adoption of fascism as a way to rebel and make herself distinct. In 1932, Unity's elder sister Diana begins an affair with British fascist leader Oswald Mosley. Against her father's wishes, Unity meets with Mosley and, according to Oswald's son, becomes a member of the party. The following year, Diana and Unity go to the Nuremberg rally as part of the British delegation, where Unity becomes obsessed with the Führer. Unity returns to Germany in the summer of 1934 and proceeds to stalk Hitler until she is eventually invited to his table at the Osteria Bavaria Restaurant in Munich. Hitler feels a mystical connection with the girl and she is subsequently invited to party rallies and state occasions. Bright visits the Oxford registry office in search of birth records.

Records of numerous births at Hill View Cottage at the time corroborate claims that it was a secret wartime maternity hospital, but none is registered to Unity. Biographers report that Hitler and Unity had become very close and that Hitler would play Unity off against his new girlfriend Eva Braun until the latter attempted suicide. Unity learned from this that desperate measure were needed to capture the Fuehrer's attention and had written a virulently anti-Semitic open-letter to Der Stürmer which concluded "P.S. please publish my name in full, I want everyone to know I am a Jew hater." Unity summers at the Berghof and discusses a possible German-British alliance with Hitler, going so far as to supply lists of potential supporters and enemies. These dreams are shattered, however, at the Bayreuth festival in 1939 when Hitler warns her of imminent war and urges her to return to Britain. She refuses and, on the day war is announced, takes the gun Hitler had given her and attempts suicide. Surviving the attempt, she is visited in hospital by Hitler who arranges for her return to England. Back in England, Bright finds apparent confirmation that she did indeed go to Wigginton. A life-time resident of Wigginton confirms to Bright that Unity stayed at Hill View Cottage, but only to recover from a nervous breakdown. In 1948 the bullet, still lodged in her brain, became infected and she died en route to hospital.

Biographers maintain that the obsessive relationship between Unity and Hitler was strictly platonic.
