= Hook Norton Ironstone Partnership =

Historical company in England

The Hook Norton Ironstone Partnership was the first company to quarry ironstone at Hook Norton on a large scale. Although only in operation for twelve years, its quarries subsequently became part of the Brymbo Steelworks quarries and relics of the Partnership's railways and tramways can still be seen today.

== History ==
=== Formation ===
A major objective in the building of the Banbury and Cheltenham Direct Railway was to place the North Oxfordshire ironstone producing district in direct communication with the South Wales coalfield. After the line had been authorised, its route at Hook Norton was altered incurring extra costs of £25,000. This change may have been influenced by the presence of ironstone at Hook Norton.

Land on both sides of the railway at Hook Norton Station was purchased by the Oxfordshire Ironstone Company on an unknown date but "probably early in 1883". This land was conveyed to a partnership of Richard Looker (the company secretary of the B&CDR), John Wilson and Henry Lovatt on 19 April 1884. The Banbury Guardian for 1 September 1884 (quoted in The Banbury and Cheltenham Direct Railway) reported:

At Bloxham and Hook Norton there is a very rich bed of iron ore, which has been purchased by the Oxfordshire Ironstone Company, and a very large income is expected to be derived from this source over the Banbury & Cheltenham Direct Railway.

The land was transferred again on 1 April 1889 to the Hook Norton Ironstone Partnership, Richard Looker being the first Partnership manager.

=== Adderbury quarries ===
The partnership obtained leases to work ironstone on the south side of Adderbury Station in the late 1880s Operations began in 1890 and the Partnership purchased a one-foot eight inch gauge 0-4-0 locomotive Florence. A tramway was built on which Florence could be used, this ran from a tipping dock in Adderbury Station goods yard. The line ran south, initially on a gradient of 1 in 17, passing under the bridleway to Paper Mill Cottages and finally reaching the working face next to the Oxford Road. Company offices and locomotive shed were located at the top of the incline. Problems were experienced with locomotive operation (Tonks suggests the gradient was too steep for Florence) and the incline was changed to cable-haulage powered by a stationary steam engine. The flatter route to the quarries was horse-worked. Florence was transferred to the Partnership's quarries at Hook Norton.

=== Hook Norton quarries ===
According to Margaret Dickins "the first cutting for ironstone was made in the field next to the station, between that and East End". That description corresponds to the present-day Austins Way. Eric Tonks states that Margaret Dickins is "probably incorrect, operations in the 'Station Field' north of the road being started shortly after the workings southeast of the station". Paul Ingham locates Station Field differently from Eric Tonks, referring to "Station Field (now called Austins Way). This was the site of the first commercial ironstone extraction in Hook Norton" Whatever the sequence of opening, the 1900 1:2500 Ordnance Survey map shows that both the Austins Way area and the field north of the road were quarried.

A house, cottages and orchards previously possessed by the Hiatt family were obtained in 1888 and ironstone production "seems to have begun in 1889". A standard gauge Manning Wardle 0-6-0ST named Hook Norton was delivered new in November 1889, this was housed in a locomotive shed alongside the Banbury Road, just east of the station.

Initially, ironstone was obtained from the field south-east of the station, where it could be loaded directly into wagons hauled by Hook Norton. Ironstone from the field north of the road was carried by horse-drawn cart to the station. A much larger area of land was acquired in the 1890s, bounded by the Banbury Road and the Sibford Road, as far as the Gate Inn. Two areas of this land were quarried by the Partnership; Townsend Quarry and Hiatt's Pit.

=== Tramway ===
To get the ironstone from the new quarries to the station, the Partnership's standard-gauge line was extended down the hillside where it passed under the north end of the B&CDR's viaduct. A tipping-dock here enabled ore to be tipped into standard-gauge wagons from a one-foot eight inch tramway above. The tipping dock was known locally as the "tip-up" or "kick-up".

The tramway ran north, on a rising gradient of about 1 in 20 passing under the Banbury Road in a tunnel. This section of the tramway was operated by cable-haulage. A second cable-hauled section took the tramway down to a stream where there was a locomotive shed. Florence was housed here after being transferred from Adderbury Quarries in 1892. From the loco shed the tramway climbed in a curve to the quarry called Hiatt's Pit. More direct access to Hiatt's Pit was provided by a double-track incline of around 1 in 11 running north from the engine shed.

A branch off the first incline near the tunnel passed under the track called Engine Shed Lane to enter Townsend Quarry. Wagons from here were attached directly to the cable for the journey to the tipping-dock. The 1900 Ordnance Survey map shows this branch as a short spur, but in the 1980s Eric Tonks found "clear evidence of a tramway alongside the lane throughout its north-south length".

=== Locomotives ===
Name	Builder	Type	Date	Works number	Notes
Hook Norton	Manning Wardle	0-6-0ST	1889	1127	Standard gauge To Great Western Railway, July 1904, No. 1337
Florence	Manning Wardle	0-4-0ST	1875	579	One foot eight inch gauge Ex Florence Colliery, Staffordshire To Brymbo Steel Co., 1904

=== Closure ===
By 1901 the Partnership had run into financial difficulties and the quarries were closed in May 1901, the company being wound up in 1903. As principal creditor, the GWR obtained the locomotive Hook Norton which was subsequently used on the Weymouth Harbour Tramway for many years. The Partnership's sidings at Hook Norton Station were also transferred to the GWR and were converted into loops. The land at Hook Norton was sold to the Brymbo Steel Company in 1909. Brymbo also bought the locomotive Florence but sold it on immediately to Dick, Kerr & Company.

The Adderbury quarries were taken over by Cochrane & Co. (Woodside) Ltd. who continued to operate and expand them.

== Present-day remains ==
The tunnel under the Banbury Road remains, the south portal is now in the garden of a private house in Austins Way. The north portal was walled up in 2010. The tipping-dock by the viaduct has also survived.

=== Remains in 2011 ===
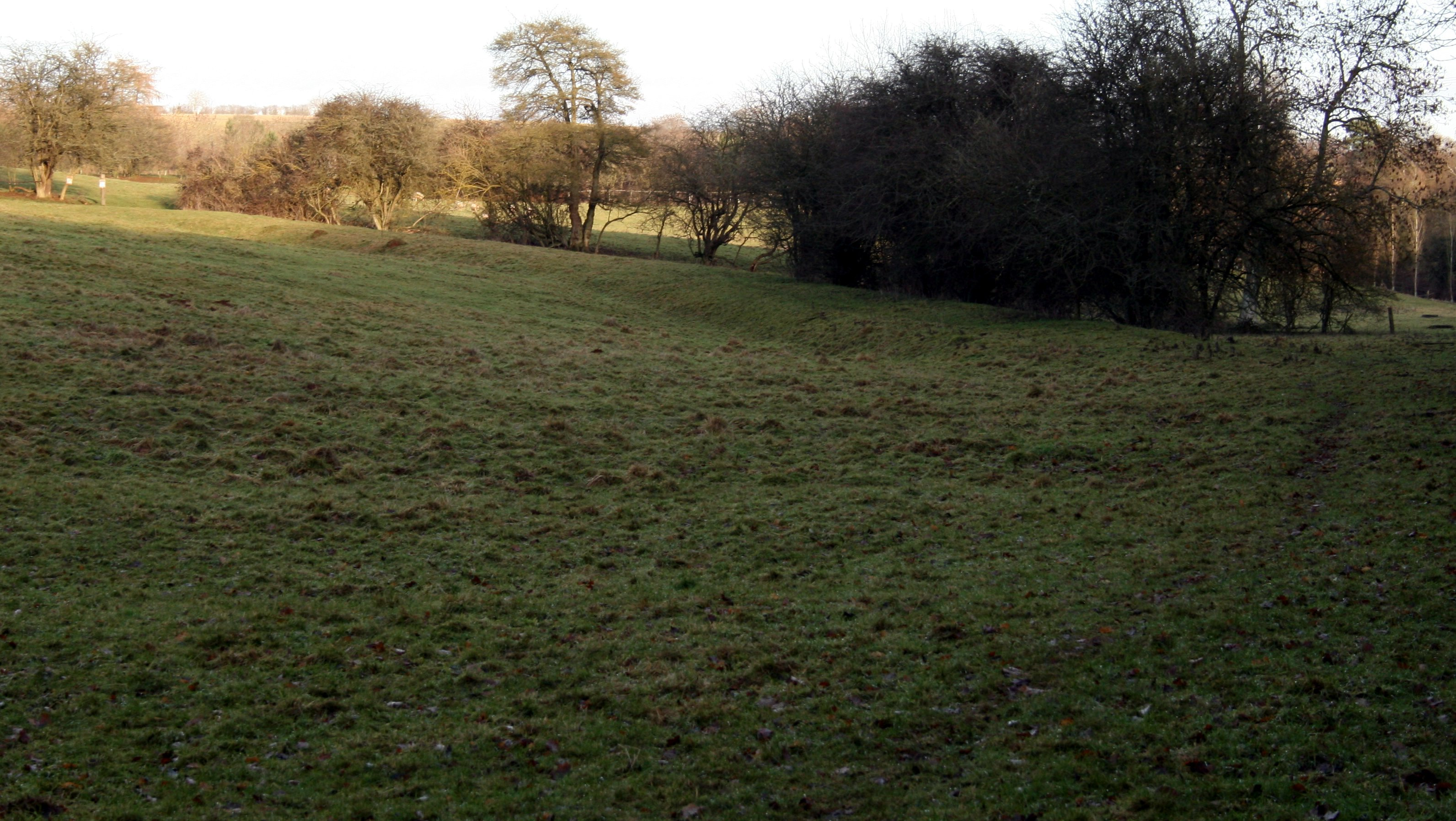
Disused railway line running across field

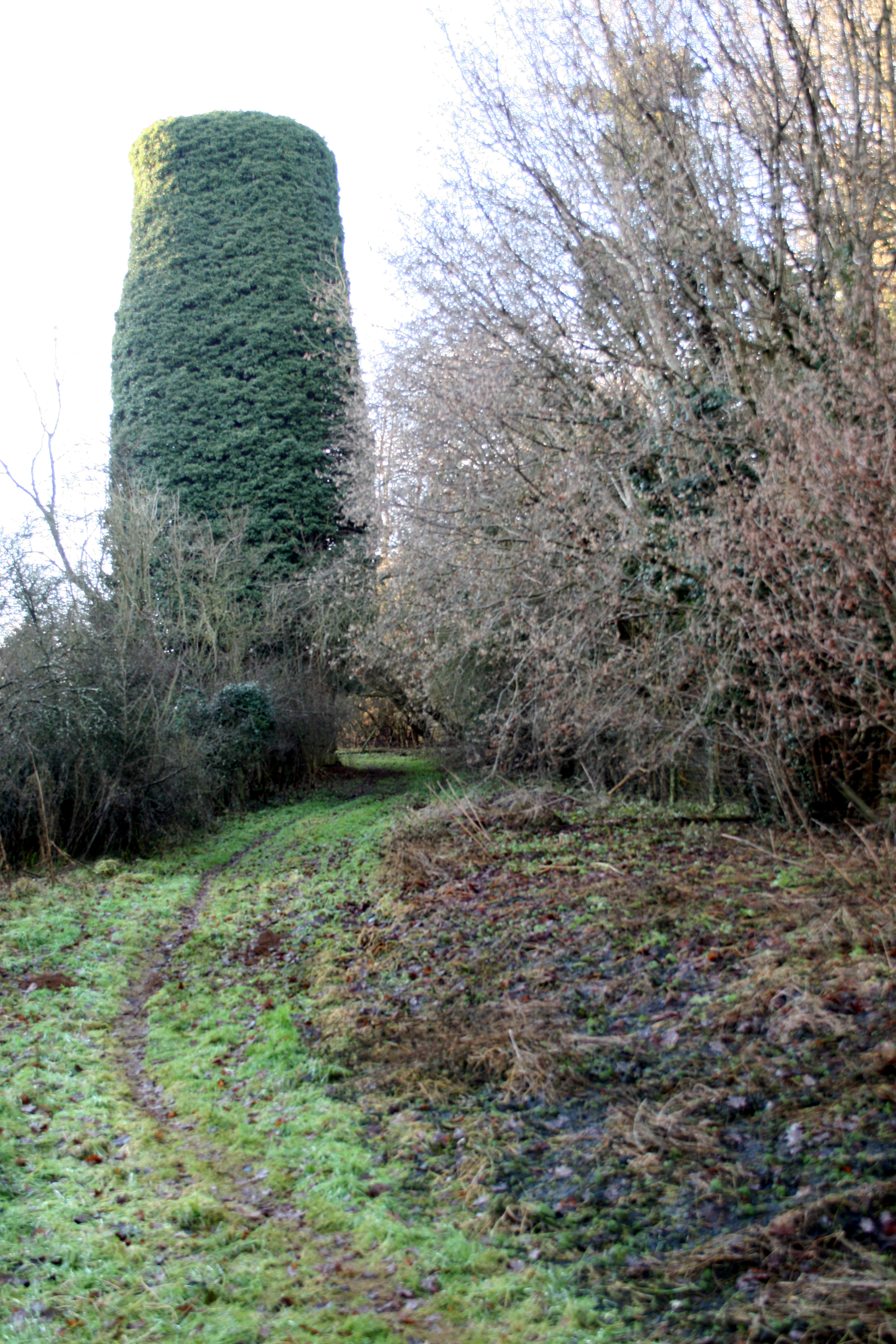
Disused railway line and stone pillar of old viaduct.

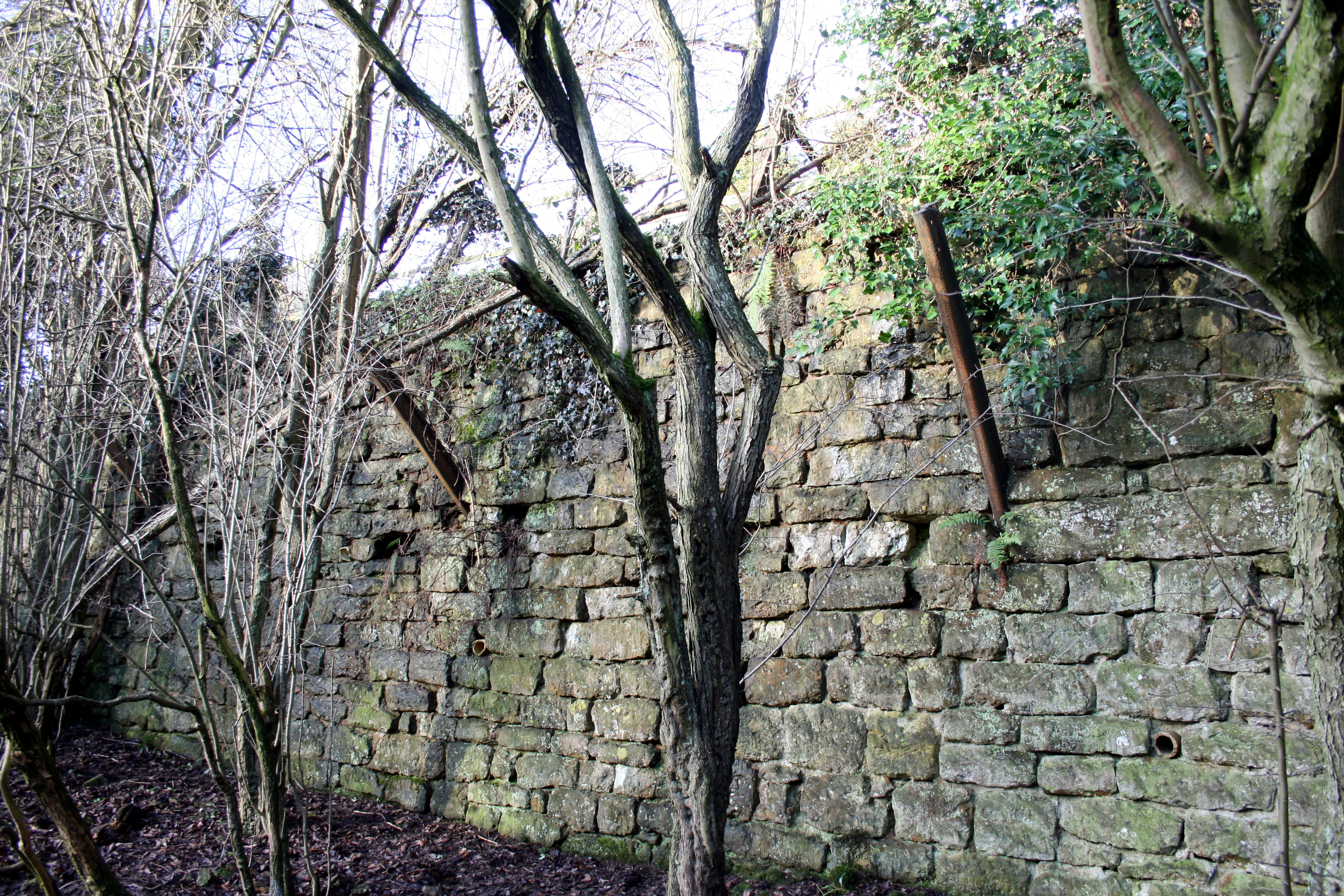
Stone wall with protruding iron bars

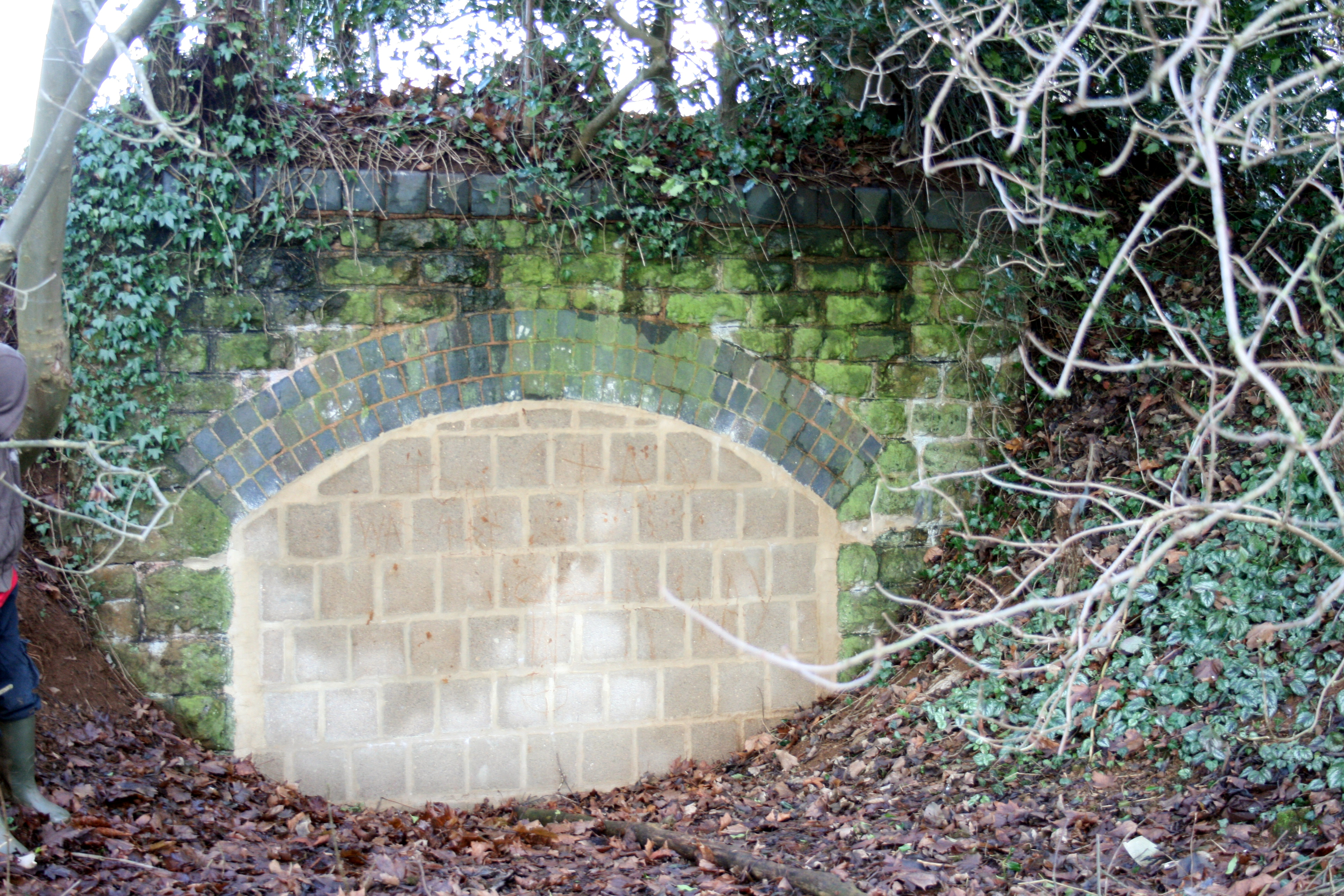
Bricked-up tunnel entrance

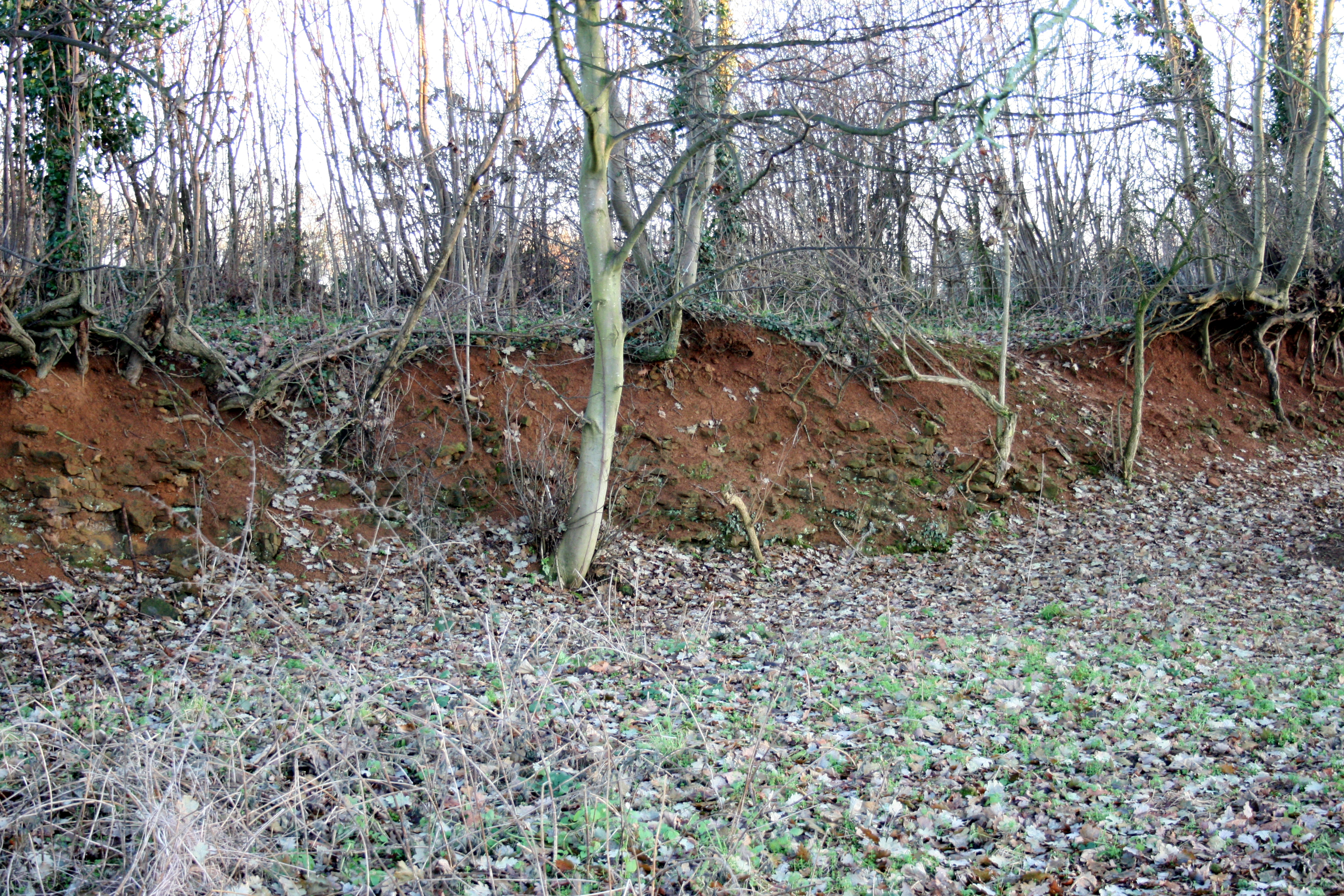
Excavated face of ironstone quarry.

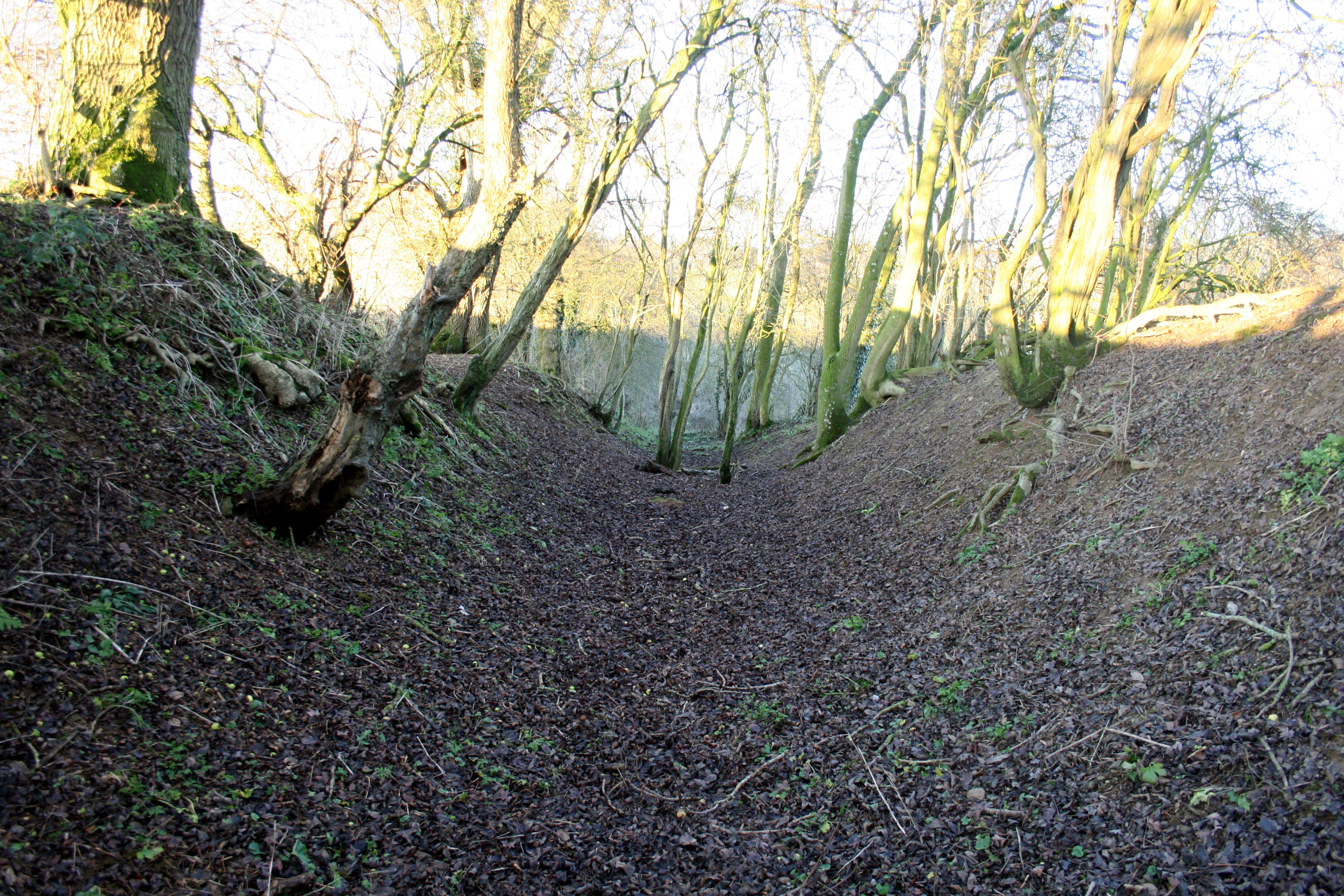
Disused tramway cutting.

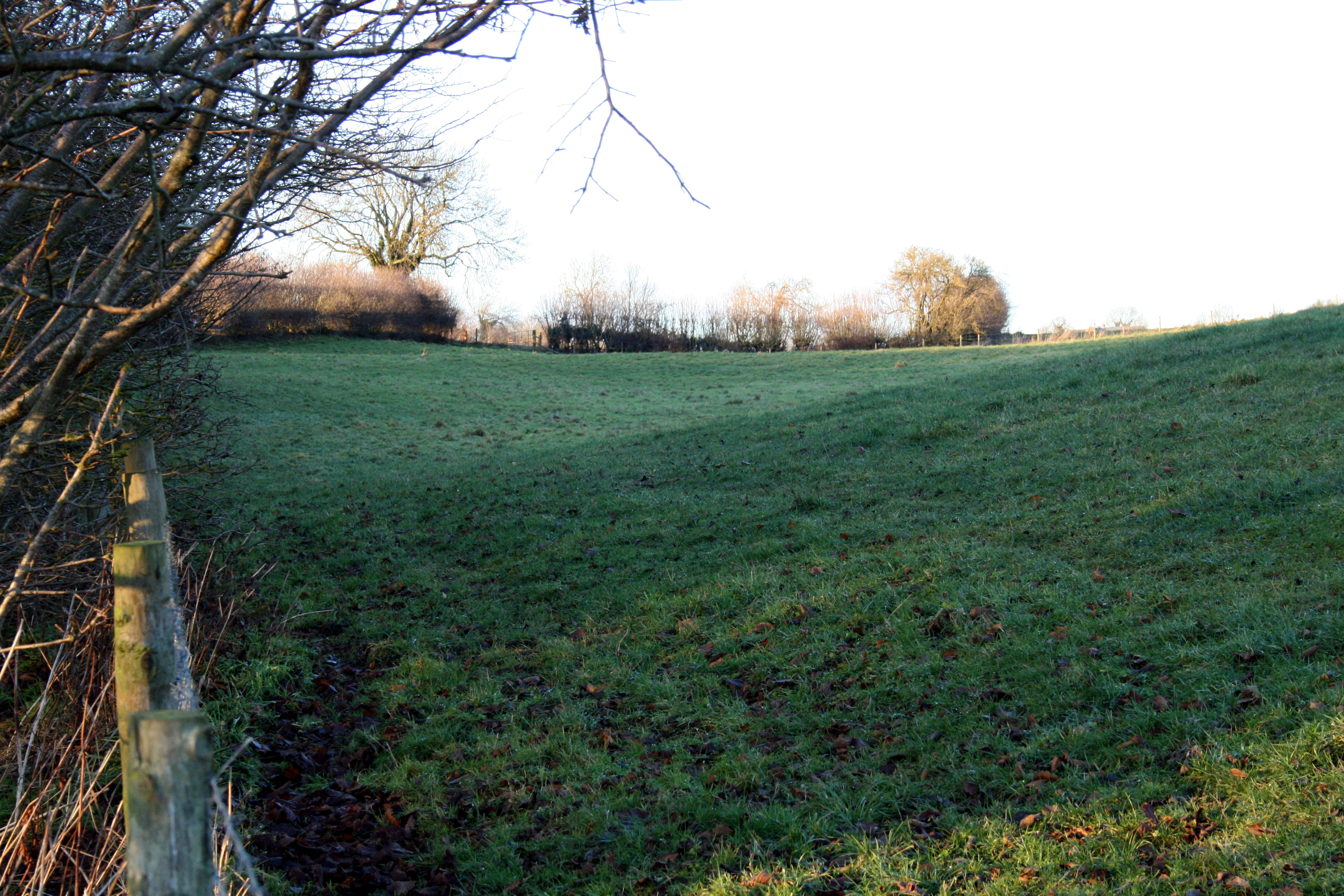
Sloping field where tramway once ran.

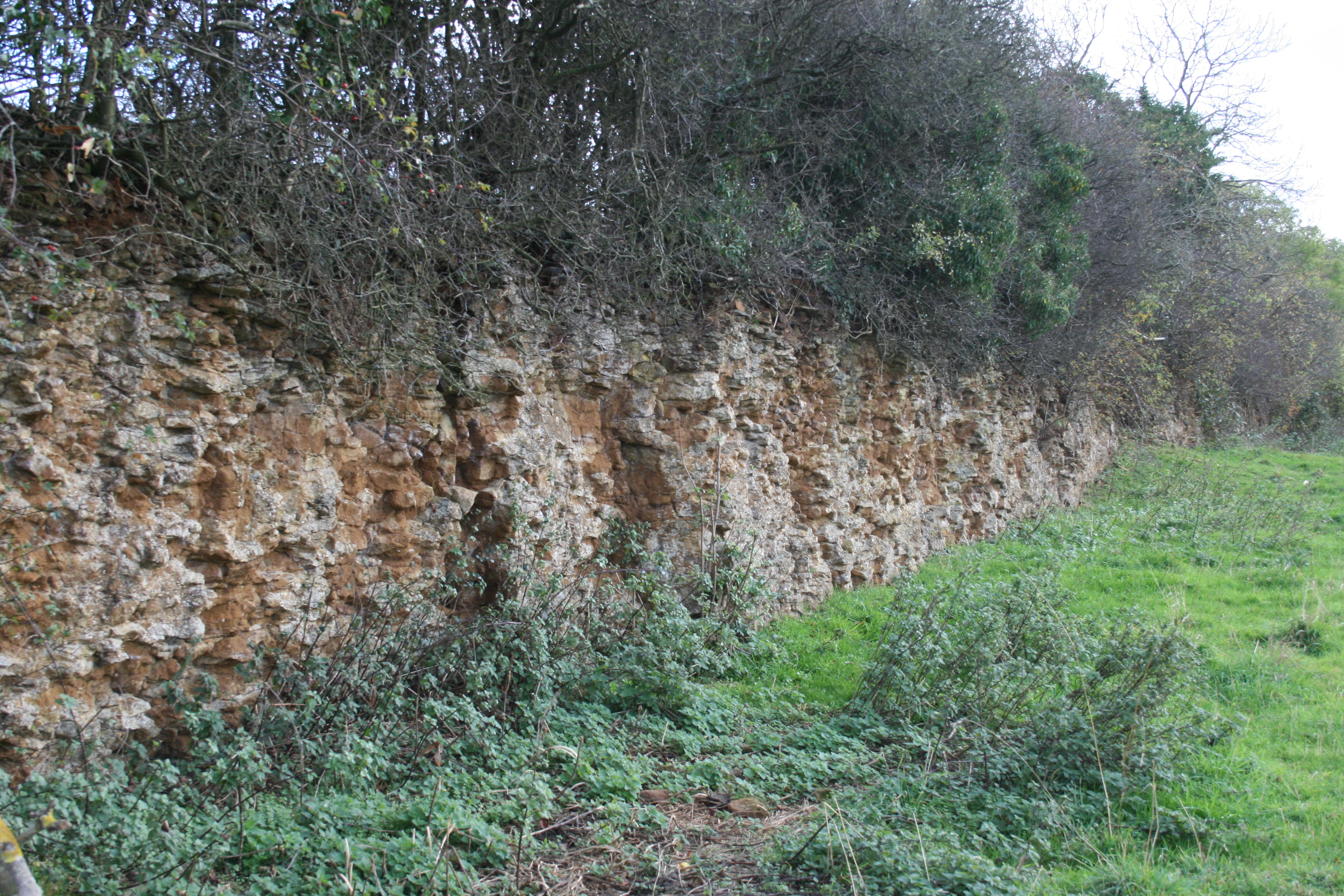
Face of Hiatt's Pit ironstone quarry.
