= Chipping Norton School =

Secondary school in Oxfordshire, England

Location
- Burford Road; OX7 5DY; England; 51.93717°N 1.54335°W

Information
- Type: Academy
- Established: 1928
- Local authority: Oxfordshire
- Department for Education URN: 137936 Tables
- Ofsted: Reports
- Head teacher: Bertram Richter
- Gender: Coeducational
- Age: 11 to 18
- Enrolment: 961
- Houses: Evenlode, Glyme, Windrush, Stour
- Website: www.chipping-norton.oxon.sch.uk

Chipping Norton School is a co-educational secondary school with academy status in Chipping Norton, Oxfordshire, England. It has 1000 students, with 200 in the sixth form. The school joined the River Learning Trust, a multi-academy trust, on 1 March 2017.

The head teacher is Bertram Richter, who replaced Barry Doherty in September 2025.

== History ==
Although there had been other schools called "Chipping Norton School", this school's origin is Chipping Norton County School, opened in 1928, and also at times known as Chipping Norton Grammar School. The school was opened on 24 May 1928 by Francis William Pember, then the vice-chancellor of the University of Oxford, who described the school as "the last word in architecture and school planning". It was co-educational. There were 41 pupils when the school opened; by October the following year, there were 97.

In the 1970s and 1980s the school was Chipping Norton Comprehensive School.

The school has a three-floor science block, built in 2011. It is next to the town's leisure centre and replaced a car park which used to be there.

In 2002, the school had a full-time police officer working on site.

== Ofsted ==
Chipping Norton School has had four full inspections carried out by Ofsted since 2012.

- 2012: The school was judged to be 'Good' overall and achieved a '2' in every marking category (on a scale of 1–4, 1 being exceptional and 4 being inadequate). They determined that the sixth form was also 'Good'.
- 2015: This was the first inspection after the school had gained academy status, and was deemed to be 'Inadequate' overall, with the Sixth Form still being rated 'Good'. The report found that attendance was below national averages and attainment of students was also below expectations.
- 2017: The report now deemed the school to be 'Good' and the Sixth Form to be 'Outstanding'.
- 2024: The school was judged to be 'Outstanding' in 4 out of 5 categories, and 'Good' in the fifth category (quality of education).

== Notable pupils ==
- Walter Padley (1916–1984), President of the Union of Shop, Distributive and Allied Workers 1948–1964, Member of Parliament 1950–1979, Minister of State for Foreign Affairs 1964–1967, Labour Party chairman 1965–1966

== Headmasters/headteachers ==
1. Mr. B.C. Orme (May 1928-April 1933)
2. Mr. A.W. Steward (May 1933-April 1944)
3. Mr. C.A. Coomber (June 1944-December 1947)
4. Mr. J.S. Robinson (April 1948-December 1951)
5. Mr. P.W. Martin (April 1952-December 1957)
6. Mr. J.D. Hobkinson (January 1958-December 1964)
7. Arthur Nockels (January 1965–1980)
8. John Howells (1980–)
9. Richard Graydon ( -2005)
10. Simon Duffy (2005–2018)
11. Barry Doherty (2018-2025)
12. Bertram Richter (2025-present)
