= Banbury Guardian =

- Type: Weekly newspaper
- Format: Tabloid
- Owner(s): National World
- Editor: Richard Howarth
- Founded: 5 April 1838
- Language: English
- Headquarters: Colin Sanders Business Innovation Centre, Banbury
- Circulation: 2,123 (as of 2023)
- Website: banburyguardian.co.uk

The Banbury Guardian is a local tabloid newspaper published in Banbury, Oxfordshire. It serves north Oxfordshire, southwest Northamptonshire and southeast Warwickshire. Its sister paper, The Banbury & District Review, is a free weekly tabloid.

== History ==
The Banbury Guardian was owned and edited by three generations of the same family for its first 109 years of publication.

In 1822, William Potts moved from Daventry to Banbury where he traded as a printer and bookseller. Potts supported the Poor Law Amendment Act 1834, and on 5 April 1838 he launched The Guardian, or Monthly Poor Law Register to

"disabuse the public mind when unfounded reports, likely to create alarm, and excite suspicion are circulated by those who, from the situations they occupy, may be supposed to possess better information than do the public generally."

William Potts increased the frequency of publication to weekly from 1843. He remained its owner and editor until his death on 4 March 1867.

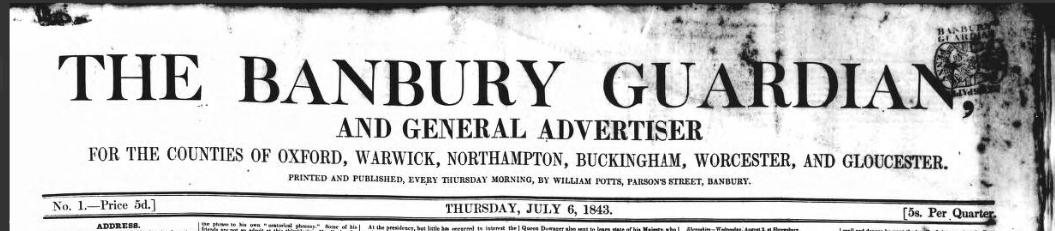
Title from front page of Banbury Guardian 1843

Upon William's death his son John Potts took over as owner and manager. When John Potts died in 1892 his newspaper published an obituary commemorating him as an "urbane and conscientious chief". John's successor was his son, another William Potts (1868–1949), who edited the paper until 1947.

The younger William Potts was also a local historian, publishing in his lifetime four historical booklets plus a booklet in 1897 to commemorate Queen Victoria's Diamond Jubilee. Potts also spent 50 years researching a full history of Banbury. He completed the first draft by 1939, but paper for printing was rationed during the Second World War and for several years thereafter, preventing its publication. Potts spent the years immediately after the war revising and condensing his draft to comply with rationing limits, but had not completed this revision by the time of his death.

Potts was succeeded as Banbury Guardian editor by Edward Clark, the first holder of that post not from the Potts family. Clark also took over Potts' history project, finally publishing it in 1958 as History of Banbury: Story of the Development of a Country Town. Clark went on to prepare a revised, expanded second edition that was published in 1978. Since 2002 the younger William Potts has been commemorated by an Oxfordshire Blue Plaque at 16 Parsons Street, Banbury.

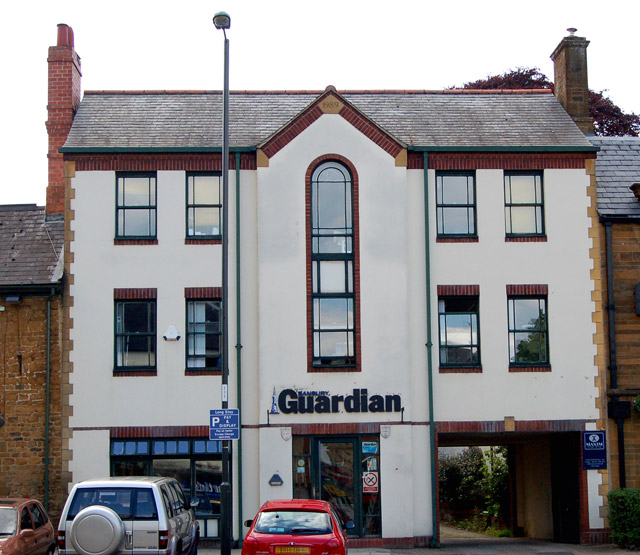
Banbury Guardian office, Former offices at North Bar Street, Banbury

On 25 March 2010 the Banbury Guardian converted from broadsheet to tabloid format.

=== The Banbury & District Review ===
Johnston Press, owners of the Banbury Guardian, also publish a local weekly free newspaper each Friday, The Banbury & District Review. It was formerly named the Banbury Citizen, then the Banbury & District Citizen. It competes with a rival weekly free paper, the Banbury Cake, that is published by Newsquest Oxfordshire.

== Current status ==
Johnston Press of Edinburgh now owns the Banbury Guardian. In the 21st century its circulation, like that of most British local and regional newspapers, is falling. From January to June 2009 its sales fell 12% to 14,895 per week.

== See also ==
- History of Banbury, Oxfordshire
- Banbury

== Bibliography ==
- Clark, Ted (1992). Banbury History and Guide. Stroud: Sutton Publishing. ISBN 0-7509-0214-0.
- Lisle, Nicola (2008). "Guardian of tradition". Oxfordshire Limited Edition (April 2008). The Oxford Times: 61–63.
- Potts, William; Clark, Edward T (1978) [1958]. History of Banbury: Story of the Development of a Country Town (revised ed.). Banbury: Gulliver Press. ISBN 0-906428-00-9.
