= List of museums in Oxfordshire =

This list of museums in Oxfordshire, England contains museums which are defined for this context as institutions (including nonprofit organizations, government entities, and private businesses) that collect and care for objects of cultural, artistic, scientific, or historical interest and make their collections or related exhibits available for public viewing. Also included are non-profit art galleries and university art galleries with permanent collections. Museums that exist only in cyberspace (i.e., virtual museums) are not included.

== Museums ==
Name	Image	Town/City	Region	Type	Summary
Abingdon County Hall Museum		Abingdon	Vale of White Horse	Local	Local history, archaeology, contemporary crafts
Ashdown House		Ashbury	Vale of White Horse	Historic house	Operated by the National Trust, 17th-century country house
Ashmolean Museum		Oxford	Oxford	Multiple	Oxford University museum, art, antiquities, archaeology, artifacts from Ancient Egypt, the Mediterranean and Near East, coins
Aston Martin Heritage Trust Museum		Drayton St. Leonard	South Oxfordshire	Automobile	Aston Martin cars and history
Banbury Museum		Banbury	Cherwell	Local	History of Banbury
Bate Collection of Musical Instruments		Oxford	Oxford	Music	Oxford University museum, historic musical instruments, mainly for Western classical music, from the medieval period onwards
Benson Veteran Cycle Museum		Benson	South Oxfordshire	Transport	Veteran and vintage cycles dating from 1818 to 1930, open by appointment
Blenheim Palace		Woodstock	West Oxfordshire	Historic house	17th century opulent country house, collections of fine and decorative art, birthplace of Winston Churchill
Bloxham Village Museum		Bloxham	Cherwell	Local	Local history, culture
Broughton Castle		Broughton	Cherwell	Historic house	Medieval manor house
Burford Tolsey Museum		Burford	West Oxfordshire	Local	Local history, culture, industry
Buscot Park		Faringdon	Vale of White Horse	Historic house	Operated by the National Trust, 18th-century country house with ornate interior, art collection
Champs Chapel Museum of East Hendred		East Hendred	Vale of White Horse	Local	History of East Hendred
Charlbury Museum		Charlbury	West Oxfordshire	Local	Local history, industry, trades and tools, costumes, household items
Chastleton House		Chastleton	West Oxfordshire	Historic house	Operated by the National Trust, 17th century Jacobean country house
Chipping Norton Museum		Chipping Norton	West Oxfordshire	Local	Local history, archaeology, agriculture, industry
Christ Church Picture Gallery		Oxford	Oxford	Art	Art museum at Christ Church, features Old Master paintings and drawings
Churchill & Sarsden Heritage Centre		Churchill	West Oxfordshire	Local	Local history
Cogges Manor Farm Museum		Witney	West Oxfordshire	Farm	Victorian era farm and historic house
Combe Mill		Combe	West Oxfordshire	Technology	Preserved beam engine and timber mill
Didcot Railway Centre		Didcot	South Oxfordshire	Railway	Railway engines with outdoor track
Dorchester Abbey Museum		Dorchester	South Oxfordshire	Religious	History of Dorchester Abbey and local history
Earth Trust Centre		Little Wittenham	South Oxfordshire	Natural history	Area landscape ecology and conservation
Greys Court		Rotherfield Greys	South Oxfordshire	Historic house	Operated by the National Trust, Tudor country house and gardens
Hook Norton Brewery		Hook Norton	Cherwell	Food	Brewery tours and museum
Kelmscott Manor		Kelmscott	West Oxfordshire	Historic house	Late 16th-century country house, interior designed by owner William Morris
Mapledurham House		Mapledurham	South Oxfordshire	Historic house	Elizabethan stately home, grounds include Mapledurham Watermill
Mapledurham Watermill		Mapledurham	South Oxfordshire	Mill	18th century watermill, located on the grounds of Mapledurham House
Modern Art Oxford		Oxford	Oxford	Art	Modern art exhibitions, formerly known as The Museum of Modern Art, Oxford
Museum of the History of Science		Oxford	Oxford	Science	Oxford University museum in the Old Ashmolean building, collection of historic scientific instruments
Museum of Oxford		Oxford	Oxford	Local	History of the city of Oxford and the University of Oxford, geology, natural history, archaeology,
Nuffield Place		Nuffield	South Oxfordshire	Historic house	Operated by the National Trust, 20th-century home of Lord Nuffield, founder of the Morris Motor Company, and his wife
Oxford Bus Museum		Long Hanborough	West Oxfordshire	Transport	Bus and road transport, Morris Motors Limited automobiles
Oxford Castle – Unlocked		Oxford	Oxford	Prison	Costumed guided tours of the crypt, castle, 18th-century debtors tower and prison D-wing, prison artifacts
The Oxfordshire Museum		Woodstock	West Oxfordshire	Multiple	Local history, popular culture, contemporary arts and crafts, archaeology, natural history, garden with life-size Megalosaurus and dinosaur footprints
Oxford University Museum of Natural History		Oxford	Oxford	Natural history	Oxford University museum, displays of animals, insects, fossils, dinosaurs, rocks and minerals
Oxford University Press Museum		Oxford	Oxford	Multiple	Oxford University museum, art, antiquities, archaeology, artifacts from Ancient Egypt, the Mediterranean and Near East, coins
Pendon Museum		Long Wittenham	South Oxfordshire	Railway	Model railways showing typical scenes on the Great Western Railway of the 1920s
Pitt Rivers Museum		Oxford	Oxford	Anthropology	Oxford University museum, based on the collection of General Augustus Pitt Rivers, archaeological and ethnographic objects from all parts of the world, includes musical instruments, weapons, masks, textiles, jewellery, tools, armour, ceramics
River and Rowing Museum		Henley-on-Thames	South Oxfordshire	Sport, local	Covers the River Thames, the sport of rowing, and the town of Henley
Science Oxford		Oxford	Oxford	Science	Connections between science, enterprise, and society
Soldiers of Oxfordshire Museum		Woodstock	West Oxfordshire	Military	How conflict affected the county, including WWII airfields, home life
Stonor Park		Stonor	South Oxfordshire	Historic house	Country house and gardens, features family portraits, stained glass, old Master Drawings, European bronzes, contemporary ceramics
The Story Museum		Oxford	Oxford	Literary	Children's literature
Swalcliffe Barn		Swalcliffe	Cherwell	Agriculture	15th century tithe barn with collection of local agricultural and trade vehicles
Swinford Museum		Filkins	West Oxfordshire	Local	Local domestic, agricultural, trade and craft tools
Thame Museum		Thame	South Oxfordshire	Local	Local history, Tudor wall paintings
Tom Brown's School Museum		Uffington	Vale of White Horse	Local	Local history, archaeology, author Thomas Hughes, poet Sir John Betjeman, Uffington White Horse
Vale and Downland Museum		Wantage	Vale of White Horse	Local	History of the Vale of White Horse area around the town of Wantage, art exhibits, 7.9m long model railway, Victorian country kitchen
Wallingford Museum		Wallingford	South Oxfordshire	Local	Local history, archaeology, Wallingford Castle, medieval life, Victorian street scene
Waterperry Gardens		Waterperry	South Oxfordshire	History	Gardens, country life museum, and Saxon church
West Oxfordshire Arts		Bampton	West Oxfordshire	Art	website, an association of artists and art enthusiasts, gallery in Bampton Town Hall
Williams F1 Grand Prix Collection		Grove	Vale of White Horse	Automotive	website, part of the RBS Williams F1 Conference Centre, Formula One racing cars and history of WilliamsF1 racing team, open for tours on select dates
Witney and District Museum		Witney	West Oxfordshire	Local	Local history, industry, transport, education and religion

== Defunct museums ==
- Bygones Museum, Claydon

== See also ==
- Category:Tourist attractions in Oxfordshire
- List of museums in Oxford
- Oxfordshire Museums Council
- Virtual Library museums pages, started at Oxford University
