= OMC =

OMC may refer to:

== Business ==
- Oil marketing company

== Organizations ==
- Odisha Mining Corporation, a state-owned mining company in Odisha, India
- OMC Shipping pte. ltd., a large bulk carrier, container and PCTC shipping company based in Singapore
- Omnicom Group (stock symbol)
- Outboard Marine Corporation
- Olifant Manufacturing Company of South Africa, now known as Land Systems OMC
- Acronym for the World Trade Organization in French, Portuguese and Spanish
- Osaka Medical College
- Oxfordshire Museums Council

== Places ==
- Ormoc Airport in Ormoc City, Leyte, the Philippines

== Musical groups ==
- OMC (band), a New Zealand music group formerly known as Otara Millionaires Club
- Old Man's Child, a Norwegian Black metal band

== Technology ==
- Operations and Maintenance Centre, a controlling equipment for telecom networks
- Orange Monte Carlo, Android phone
- OpenModelica Compiler

== Other ==
- Octyl methoxycinnamate, the active ingredient in sunscreens
- Open Method of Coordination, a means of governance in the European Union
- Ontario Medal for Good Citizenship
- Order of Civil Merit, one of Spain's highest honours
- Order of Cultural Merit
- "Ordinary muon capture"
- Outlaw motorcycle club
