= Chipping Norton Museum =

Museum in Oxfordshire, England

Coordinates: 51.9409°N 1.5453°W

Chipping Norton Museum (a.k.a. Chipping Norton Museum of Local History) is an independent local museum located on the High Street in the town of Chipping Norton, Oxfordshire, England.

The museum is located on the first floor of the Chipping Norton Co-operative Society Hall, which dates from the 1880s. The museum's exhibits present Chipping Norton's development from Saxon times, including its role as a market town involved in the wool trade.

== See also ==
- List of museums in Oxfordshire
- Museum of Oxford
