= The Oxfordshire Museum =

Museum in Woodstock, Oxfordshire, England

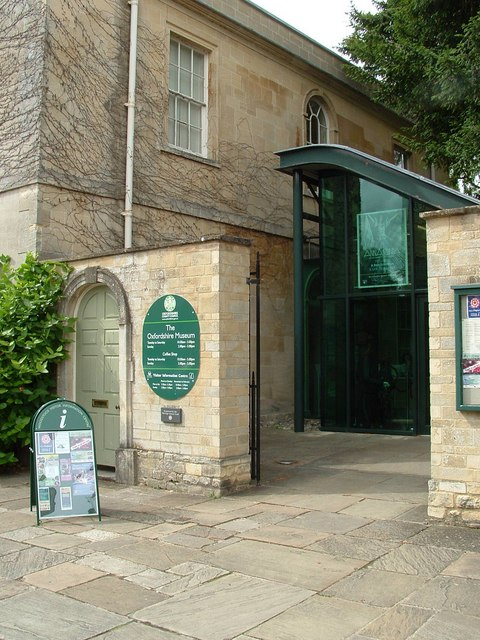
- The entrance to the museum

- Shown within Oxfordshire
- Location: Fletcher's House, Park Street, Woodstock, Oxfordshire, England
- Coordinates: 51.8483°N 1.3572°W
- Website: www.oxfordshire.gov.uk/the_oxfordshire_museum

The Oxfordshire Museum (also known as Oxfordshire County Museum) is in Woodstock, Oxfordshire, England, located in Fletcher's House, Park Street, opposite the Bear Hotel. It is a regional museum covering the county of Oxfordshire. The museum is located on the edge of the Cotswolds.

The museum features collections of local history, art, archaeology, the landscape and wildlife relating to the county of Oxfordshire, and to the town of Woodstock in particular. The museum is run by Oxfordshire County Council and is located in a large historic house, Fletcher's House, in the centre of Woodstock. The museum has 11 galleries. There is also a coffee shop and a large garden behind the museum, which includes a Dinosaur Garden, displaying megalosaur footprints found in a limestone quarry near Ardley. In 2025, the museum raised £10,500 to purchase an Iron Age hoard that was discovered in the county in 2020.

Admission is free.

In 2014, the Soldiers of Oxfordshire Museum (SOFO) was opened in the grounds of the museum. In 2021, SOFO launched a crowdfunding campaign for seven weeks to build a life-size WW2 Anderson Shelter.

== See also ==
- List of museums in Oxfordshire
- Museum of Oxford
- Ashmolean Museum
