= Thame Museum =

Museum in Thame, Oxfordshire, England

Coordinates: 51.7492°N 0.9810°W

Thame museum
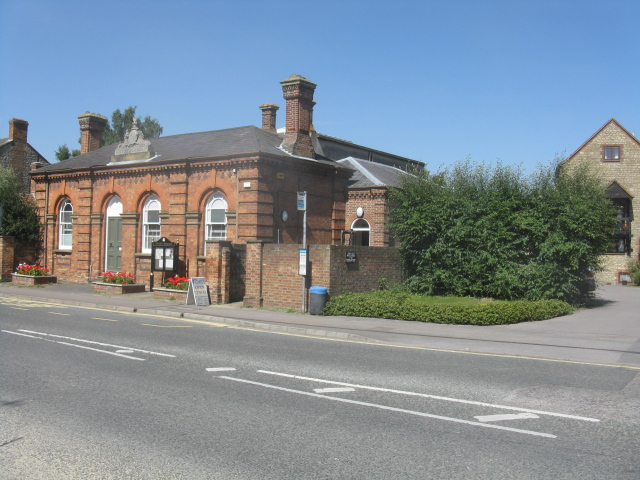
- View of Thame Museum
- Location: 79 High St, Thame OX9 3AE
- Type: History museum
- Website: https://thamemuseum.org/

Thame Museum is a local museum located in the High Street of the town of Thame in Oxfordshire, England.

The museum has a number of nationally important Tudor wall paintings, housed in their own room. The main gallery houses various displays and artefacts detailing the history of Thame. A Community Room is used for temporary exhibitions and other activities. It also houses a gift shop.

Thame Museum is home to The Official Robin Gibb Gallery. Opened in 2022 as a permanent tribute to the Bee Gee Robin Gibb who lived in Thame at The Prebendal. Robin's resting place is at St Mary's Church in Thame.

Admission is free.

== Previous use as the county court ==
Thame museum was originally built as the town's county court house in 1861. It was bought by Thame Town Council in 2005 to house Thame museum. Today you can still see a coat of arms on the front of the building and a model policeman welcomes you as you enter. The main gallery used to be the main courtroom.

== See also ==
- List of museums in Oxfordshire
- Museum of Oxford
