= Churchill & Sarsden Heritage Centre =

Museum in Churchill, Oxfordshire, England

Coordinates: 51.91877°N 1.59560°W

Churchill & Sarsden Heritage Centre is a heritage centre in the Cotswolds village of Churchill, Oxfordshire, England.

== Overview ==
The Heritage Centre is housed in the remains of the chancel of a medieval church, the village having been destroyed by fire in 1684. The centre presents the history of the village from 1600 onwards, using touchscreen technology and digital displays. Churchill was the birthplace of the first Governor General of India, Warren Hastings (1732–1818), and the early geologist William Smith (1769–1839).

== See also ==
- Museum of Oxford
- List of museums in Oxfordshire

== Bibliography ==
- Mann, Ralph (2013). A History of Churchill and Sarsden.
