= Benson Veteran Cycle Museum =

Veteran cycle museum in Benson, Oxfordshire, England

Coordinates: 51.62303°N 1.10222°W

Benson Veteran Cycle Museum is a private museum of veteran cycles located at The Bungalow on Brook Street in the village of Benson near Wallingford in Oxfordshire, England.

The museum features a large private collection of over 500 historic cycles dating from 1818 to 1930, alongside associated archival documentation and records compiled by its late founder, Ned Passey. The museum is open strictly by appointment only. The associated Benson Veteran Cycle Club hosts an annual rally on the first Sunday of July each year, drawing vintage cycling enthusiasts from across the region.

== See also ==
- Museum of Oxford
- History of the bicycle
- History of cycling
- List of museums in Oxfordshire
