= Swinford Museum =

Museum in Filkins, Oxfordshire, England

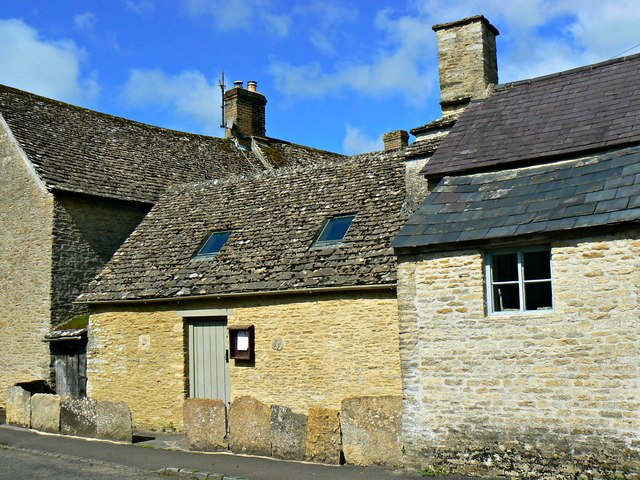
- View of the museum building
- Established: 1931
- Location: Filkins, Oxfordshire, England
- Coordinates: 51.73631°N 1.65649°W
- Type: Local museum
- Collections: Local domestic, agricultural, trade, and craft tools
- Founder: George Swinford

Swinford Museum is a small local museum in the village of Filkins, west Oxfordshire, England.

The collection covers local domestic, agricultural, trade, and craft tools. The museum is housed in a 17th-century cottage. It was founded by George Swinford in 1931, hence the name, with the help of Sir Stafford Cripps.

== See also ==
- List of museums in Oxfordshire
- Museum of Oxford
