= Soldiers of Oxfordshire Museum =

Military museum in Woodstock, England

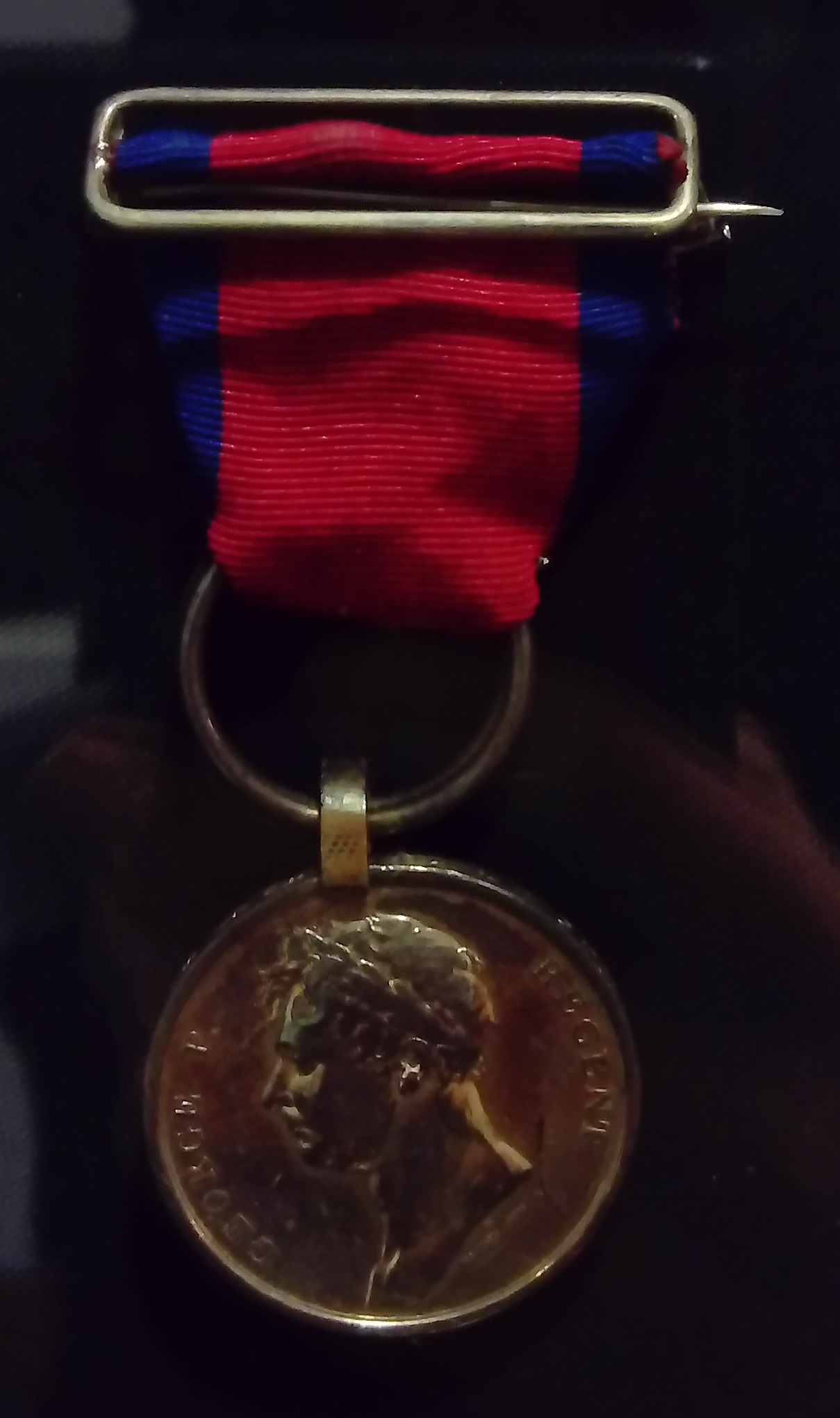
- Waterloo Medal awarded to Sir Charles Rowan, in the museum collection

- Shown within Oxfordshire
- Established: 2014
- Location: Woodstock, Oxfordshire,
- Coordinates: 51.8483°N 1.3572°W
- Website: www.sofo.org.uk

The Soldiers of Oxfordshire Museum is a military museum in the town of Woodstock, Oxfordshire, England, north of Oxford. The museum is on the edge of the Cotswolds.

== History ==
Colonel Robin Evelegh, in whose memory the Evelegh Gallery is named, and Colonel Tim May both played a leading role in the idea and development of the £3.2 million museum which was opened by the Princess Royal in 2014. The museum was created to honour soldiers from Oxfordshire regiments and present their history. The museum is located in the grounds of The Oxfordshire Museum, with access through the entrance of that museum.

== See also ==
- List of museums in Oxfordshire
- Museum of Oxford
