= Robin Evelegh =

British Army officer (1932–2010)

Colonel Robin Evelegh (23 November 1932 – 15 May 2010) was a British Army officer who was the author of Peace-Keeping in a Democratic Society-The Lessons of Northern Ireland (1978) which was based on his experiences as an infantry battalion commander in Belfast and which influenced later peacekeeping operations.

John Robin Garnet Nial Evelegh was born in Madras, India. He was educated at Rugby School and Magdalen College, Oxford, where he took a degree in modern history.

Evelegh was commissioned into the 1st Battalion The Oxfordshire and Buckinghamshire Light Infantry, 43rd and 52nd in 1952. He served with the 1st Green Jackets (43rd and 52nd) in Penang and during the insurgency in Brunei in 1962. He later served in Borneo during the confrontation with Indonesia. He served in Cyprus and Berlin. He was ADC to the Commander 1st (British) Corps with BAOR. He was promoted to lieutenant colonel in 1970 and became military assistant to the Master-General of the Ordnance.

Evelegh was appointed to command and reform the 3rd Battalion The Royal Green Jackets in 1971. He commanded the battalion in an emergency tour of duty in the Upper Falls area of Belfast in 1972. He later commanded the battalion in a second tour of duty in the same area of Belfast in 1973-74 for which he was mentioned in despatches.

He undertook a defence fellowship study at Oxford in 1974 where he studied the problems of the constitutional and legal framework that the military operated in whilst peace-keeping in a Democratic Society. Evelegh was promoted to colonel in 1976 and was appointed head of the department of the Ministry of Defence for defence related matters in the Middle East. He retired from the Army in 1977.

His influential book Peace-Keeping in a Democratic Society-The Lessons of Northern Ireland was published in 1978. He helped found and became Managing Director of Ridgeway International in 1977. From 1999 Evelegh had a key role in both the concept and development of the Soldiers of Oxfordshire Museum. The Museum's Evelegh Gallery is named in memory of his role in its foundation.

He married Gabrielle Ritson in 1958 with whom he was to have two sons and one daughter.

Colonel Robin Evelegh died on 15 May 2010.
