= Oxfordshire Museums Council =

Organisation representing museums in England

The Oxfordshire Museums Council (OMC) is an organisation representing museums in Oxfordshire, England.

OMC was founded in 1983 and represents around 40 museums. It is a registered charity (no. 296734) that is formed of representatives from museums operated by the local authority and Oxford University, as well as independent and volunteer museums.

== See also ==
- List of museums in Oxfordshire
- Museum of Oxford
