= Table engine =

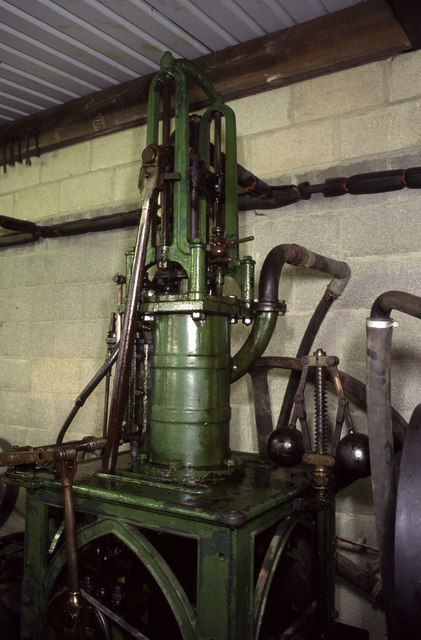
Table engine built by Lampitt of Banbury c1850 and used at the Hunt Edmunds brewery

A table engine is a variety of stationary steam engine where the cylinder is placed on top of a table-shaped base, the legs of which stand on the baseplate which locates the crankshaft bearings. The piston rod protrudes from the top of the cylinder and has fixed to it a cross-head which runs in slides attached to, and rising from, the cylinder top. Long return rods connect the crosshead to the crankshaft, on which is fixed the flywheel.

This pattern of engine was first introduced by James Sadler at the Portsmouth Dockyard in 1798 and was house-built in that its framing was formed by the engine house, as had been common practice for beam engines.

Henry Maudslay patented an improved version of this a few years later, and other makers adopted the configuration.

It was supplied for low-speed, low-power applications around the first half of the nineteenth century. They continued to be made in a range of sizes, down to very small, with a bore and stroke of only a few inches.

The table engine was one of the first types (Note: Richard Trevithick had also built a number of stationary engines which used their boiler as a framework to support their cylinder and crankshaft.) where the engine was constructed as an independent unit, rather than being house-built. This made the engines cheaper, and more importantly quicker, to erect on site. Entire engines could be built and tested at their factory before delivery. Engines could also be pre-built, then offered for sale from stock, rather than having to be designed and constructed for each site.

One reason for the continued use of a vertical cylinder (Note: Engines up to this point, with only rare exceptions, were beam engines using a vertical cylinder.) was the belief that with a horizontal cylinder, the weight of the piston within the cylinder would lead to uneven wear on the lower bore of the cylinder. This erroneous view was not dispelled until around 1830 and the increasing number of steam locomotives using horizontal cylinders without such wear problems.
