= Churchill, Oxfordshire =

Village in Oxfordshire, England

Coordinates: 51.917°N 1.590°W

Churchill
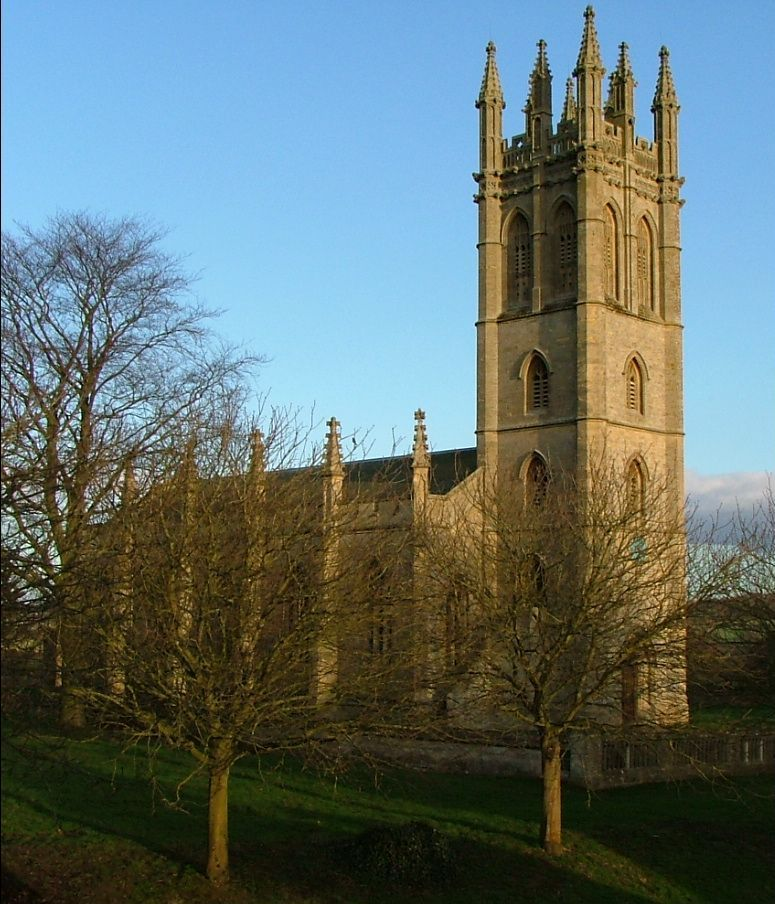
- All Saints' parish church

- Location within Oxfordshire
- Population: 583 (Parish, 2021)
- OS grid reference: SP2824
  - London: 77 mi (124 km)
- Civil parish: Churchill
- District: West Oxfordshire
- Shire county: Oxfordshire
- Region: South East
- Country: England
- Sovereign state: United Kingdom
- Post town: Chipping Norton
- Postcode district: OX7
- Dialling code: 01608
- Police: Thames Valley
- Fire: Oxfordshire
- Ambulance: South Central
- UK Parliament: Banbury
- Website: Churchill and Sarsden

Churchill is a village and civil parish in the West Oxfordshire district of Oxfordshire, England. It lies within the Cotswolds Area of Outstanding Natural Beauty, about three miles (five kilometres) south-west of Chipping Norton. At the 2021 census the parish had a population of 583. Since 1976 the parish has shared a grouped parish council with the neighbouring parish of Sarsden.

== Toponym ==
The Domesday Book of 1086 recorded the toponym as Cercelle. A pipe roll from 1168 records it as Cerzhulla. A charter of the Priory of St Frideswide, Oxford from about 1175 records it as Chirchehull. Other late 11th-century, 12th century and early 13th-century variants include Cercell, Cercell', Cercella, Cerchil, Cerchull and Cerchulla. A Close Roll from 1220 records it as Cerceill'. An entry in the Book of Fees for about 1235–36 records it as Cershull'. An assize roll from 1246–47 Latinises the name as Sercellis. A feudal aid document from 1346 records it as Cerccell.

The name is derived from Old English. The parish's old church (see below) was not on top of the hill, so the name may not necessarily refer to a hill with or belonging to a church. There is a barrow almost at the top of the hill, so the first part of the name could be derived from the Brythonic word cruoco or crūc, meaning a hill, burial ground, or barrow. But if this is the case, crūc must have become confused with the Old English cirice ("church") at an early date.

== History ==
Churchill was originally at the foot of a hill now called Hastings Hill, but on 31 July 1684 a fire destroyed 20 houses and many other buildings, and killed four people. The village was rebuilt higher up the hill, with stone houses instead of the old timber-framed and thatched cottages. The fire was apparently caused by a baker who, to avoid chimney tax, had knocked through the wall from her oven to her neighbour's chimney. The old village can still be seen as grassy mounds in the pastures around the Heritage Centre.

The former Chipping Norton Railway, part of the Great Western Railway, passed near Churchill. The line had a small railway station, Sarsden Halt, 1/4 mi (400 m) northwest of Churchill. British Railways closed the halt to passengers in 1962 and closed the railway in 1964.

== Churches ==
=== Old parish church ===
The Heritage Centre is on what is thought to be the site of a Saxon church. In 1348 the church of which the chancel – now the Churchill Heritage Centre – is the last remaining part was built in the Decorated Gothic style. At that time it was at the centre of the village, but after the fire of 1684 the village moved up the hill, and the old parish church of All Saints was left at the edge of the village. By the end of the 18th century the church was said to be in disrepair, and in 1825 James Haughton Langston (1796–1863), who had the living of Churchill & Sarsden, and who owned the Sarsden estate and most of Churchill, built a new one higher up the hill in what had become the centre of the village. The new All Saints was consecrated in 1827. The old church fell into disrepair, but the chancel was retained and used as a mortuary chapel and to house the memorials and in 1869 the Gothic Revival architect CC Rolfe added a new east window.

A Preservation Society was formed in 1988 to campaign for its retention as the last medieval building in Churchill and the building was repaired. The Heritage Centre opened in 2001 in the restored chancel which now houses a collection of maps and historical records of the village from 1600 to the present, as well as displays about Warren Hastings and William Smith. Having received a Heritage Lottery Fund grant in 2010, the building has been refurbished with new interactive displays and oral history recordings.

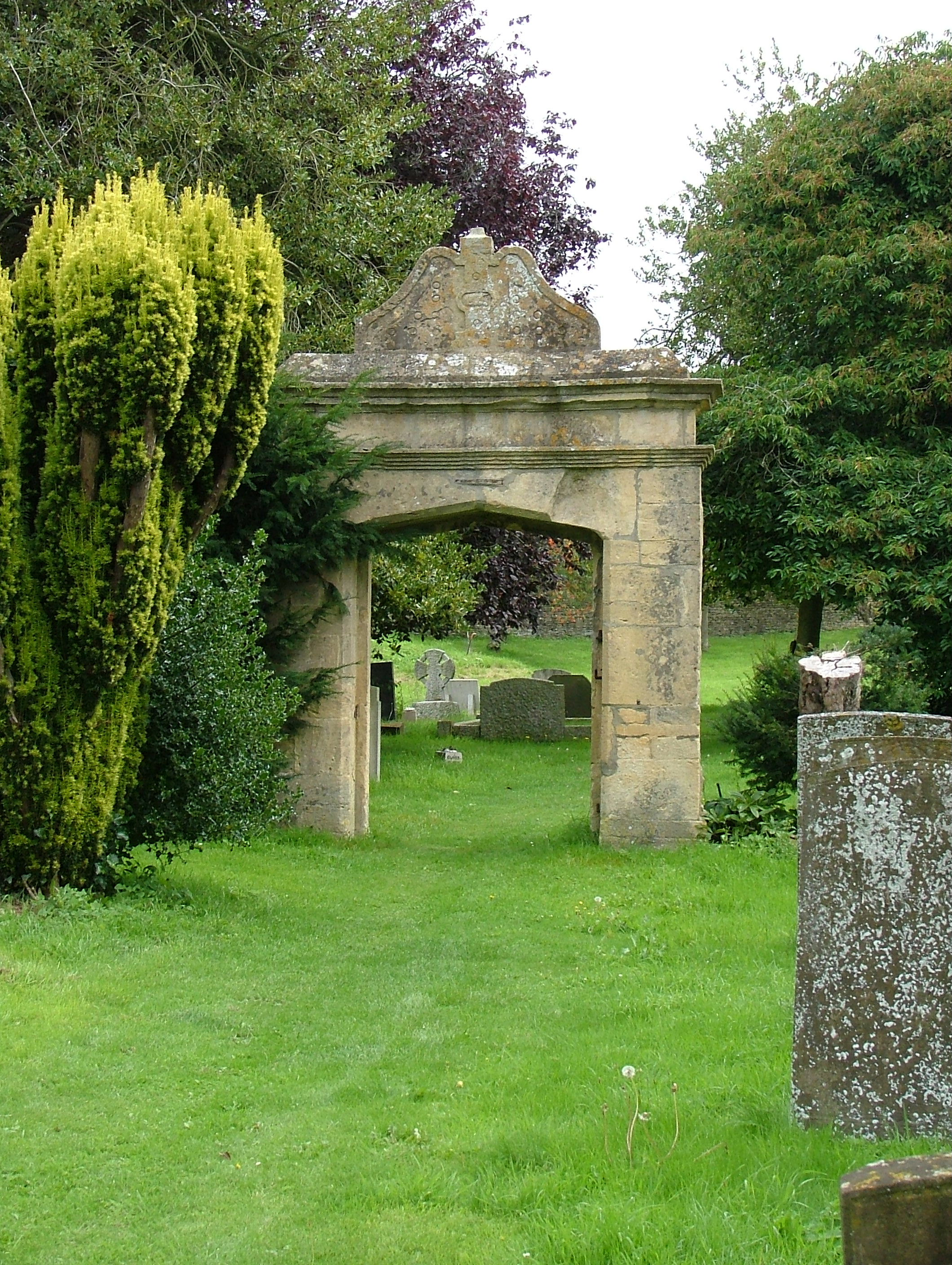
Old gateway in Churchill graveyard

=== New parish church ===
The Church of England parish church of All Saints was designed by James Plowman of Oxford in 1826. It is an architectural mixture of imitations. The tower is a two-thirds copy of the tower of Magdalen College, Oxford, its hammerbeam roof a copy of the roof of Christ Church, Oxford, its buttresses are versions of those of the chapel of New College, Oxford, and its windows are based on those from various Oxford Colleges. In a restoration appeal for the tower in 1975, Sir John Betjeman wrote of it:

It is a beautiful landmark and has [...] been an eye-catcher for miles around, and a delightful one. I am sure it was built with this object in view. Although the style is English Perpendicular Gothic, the Tower is in the great tradition of English landscape gardening. Its disappearance would be a grave loss to a rolling wooded landscape.

The west tower has a ring of eight bells. Robert Taylor and Sons cast the third, fourth, fifth and sixth bells in 1826 at their then bell-foundry in Oxford. Their successors John Taylor & Co of Loughborough cast the treble, second, seventh and tenor bells in 1957. Robert Taylor and Sons also made the clock for the west tower. External stairs lead to the bell-ringers' chamber, with a pulpit at the top of the staircase. In imitation of the May morning celebrations at Magdalen College, villagers gather at sunrise on 1 May each year and sing from the stairs and pulpit. The church was damaged by fire on 11 August 2007. It was reopened 15 months later and repairs were completed in the summer of 2009. It is a Grade II* listed building. All Saints' parish is part of the Benefice of Chipping Norton.

=== Methodist church ===
Churchill has a Methodist church. It is a member of the West Oxfordshire Methodist Circuit.

== Monuments ==
There are three notable monuments in the village. A monolith, made of stone found in nearby Sarsden Wood, was erected in 1891 at the behest of the 3rd Earl of Ducie, commemorates William Smith. A memorial fountain, erected in 1870 at the behest of Julia, Countess of Ducie, commemorates her father, James Haughton Langston. Jennifer Sherwood described this fountain as: "Memorably ugly. A squat, square tower with obelisks and flying buttresses carrying a dumpy spire. The water drips from a rude spout at the side." There is also a parish war memorial.

== Governance ==
There are three tiers of local government covering Churchill, at parish, district and county level: Churchill and Sarsden Parish Council, West Oxfordshire District Council, and Oxfordshire County Council. The parish council is a grouped parish council, set up in 1976 to cover both Churchill and the neighbouring parish of Sarsden.

== Notable people ==
- Warren Hastings (1732–1818) the first Governor-General of British India, was born in Churchill on 6 December 1732. His mother died within a week of his birth, and he took her maiden name as his Christian name after his father abandoned him; he was brought up by a foster mother (Mary Ellis). He was educated at the parish school, and went on to a successful career in the British East India Company, becoming Governor-General in 1774. On his return to England his political enemies had him impeached, and although he won his case, it ate up most of his fortune. He did manage, however, to buy back the family estates in Daylesford, a village near Churchill, and died there on 22 August 1818.
- William Smith (1769–1839) "Strata Smith" was the "father of English geology". Smith was born in Churchill on 23 March 1769, the son of a blacksmith. He was educated at the parish school until he was 11, then went to London for two years. In 1788, when he returned to Churchill, his uncle (a Hook Norton farmer) encouraged his interest in surveying, and together they pursued various schemes for land improvement and drainage. At 18 he became an assistant surveyor, helping to survey Churchill and Sarsden for the Sarsden, Churchill and Shipton-under-Wychwood (Oxfordshire) Inclosure Act 1787 (27 Geo. 3. c. 27 Pr.). His experience of different rock formations led him to develop the theory that the occurrence of different types of fossil could be used to order the geological sequence of rock strata. Although from 1800 he gained a reputation as a civil engineer, he became famous for preparing and producing a series of detailed geological maps of England. He died on 28 August 1839 in Northampton.
- Celebrity chef Rick Stein was born in Churchill.

== Amenities ==
The village has a public house, the Chequers, built in the late 18th or early 19th century. It was controlled by Hunt Edmunds brewery before Mitchells & Butlers Brewery took the company over in the 1960s. It is now a gastropub operated by The Lionhearth Group. The village hall was built in 1870 at the behest of James Langston as a Reading Room for the village. It was converted into the village hall after the Second World War. Bus route X8 serves the village. Buses run peak hours only, Monday to Friday, linking Kingham railway station and Chipping Norton via Churchill. Pulham's Coaches operates the route for Oxfordshire County Council.

Churchill had two primary schools: the "Top School", opposite the church on Junction Road, was the Girls' School, and the "Lower School", further down the hill on the Sarsden Road, was the Boys' School. Their dates are somewhat obscure; the Lower School is said to have been built in 1716, though that seems surprisingly early to some historians, and the deeds of the Top School date it to the 1850s, though its rainwater heads are dated 1870. The Lower School was closed in 1947, the Top School in 1982, and both have been converted and divided into private houses.

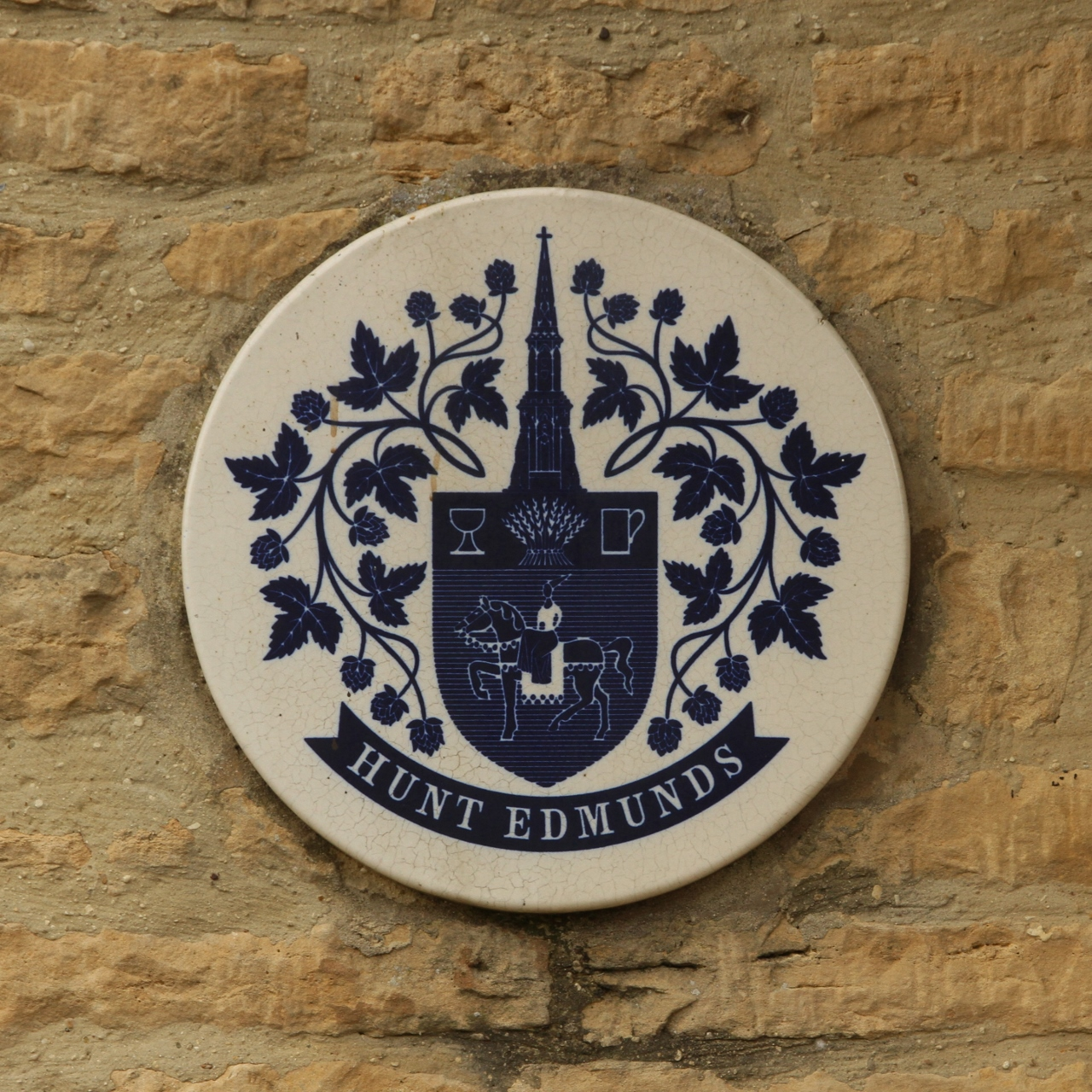
Hunt Edmunds plaque on the front of the Chequers

== See also ==
- Churchill & Sarsden Heritage Centre

== Sources ==
- Anonymous (2010) [2000]. All Saints Church Churchill (3rd ed.). Churchill: All Saints PCC.
- Baz (3 June 2004). "Churchill Standing Stone". The Megalithic Portal.
- Ekwall, Eilert (1960) [1936]. Concise Oxford Dictionary of English Place-Names (4th ed.). Oxford: Oxford University Press. Churchill. ISBN 0198691033.
- Gelling, Margaret (1954). Smith, AH (ed.). The Place-Names of Oxfordshire, Part II. Vol. XXIV. based on material collected by Doris Mary Stenton. Cambridge: Cambridge University Press for the English Place-Name Society. Churchill.
- Haddon, Celia (11 February 2011). "Old Vicarage". The Megalithic Portal.
- Jenkins, Stanley; Brown, Bob; Parkhouse, Neil (2004). The Banbury & Cheltenham Direct Railway. Lydney: Lightmoor Press. ISBN 1-899889-15-9.
- Mann, Ralph (2013). A History of Churchill and Sarsden. Churchill: Churchill Old Church Preservation Society. ISBN 978-0-9575690-0-3.
- Morton, John L (2001). Strata: How William Smith Drew the First Map of the Earth in 1801 & Inspired the Science of Geology. Stroud: Tempus Publishing. ISBN 0-7524-1992-7.
- Sherwood, Jennifer; Pevsner, Nikolaus (1974). Oxfordshire. The Buildings of England. Harmondsworth: Penguin Books. pp. 544–545. ISBN 0-14-071045-0.
- Watkins, Alan (1988). Churchill and Sarsden: A Portrait in Old Photographs. Stroud: Alan Sutton Publishing. ISBN 0-9513622-0-8.
