= Hunt Edmunds =

Historical brewery in Oxfordshire, United Kingdom

Coordinates: 52°3′40″N 1°20′0″W

Hunt Edmunds & Co Ltd
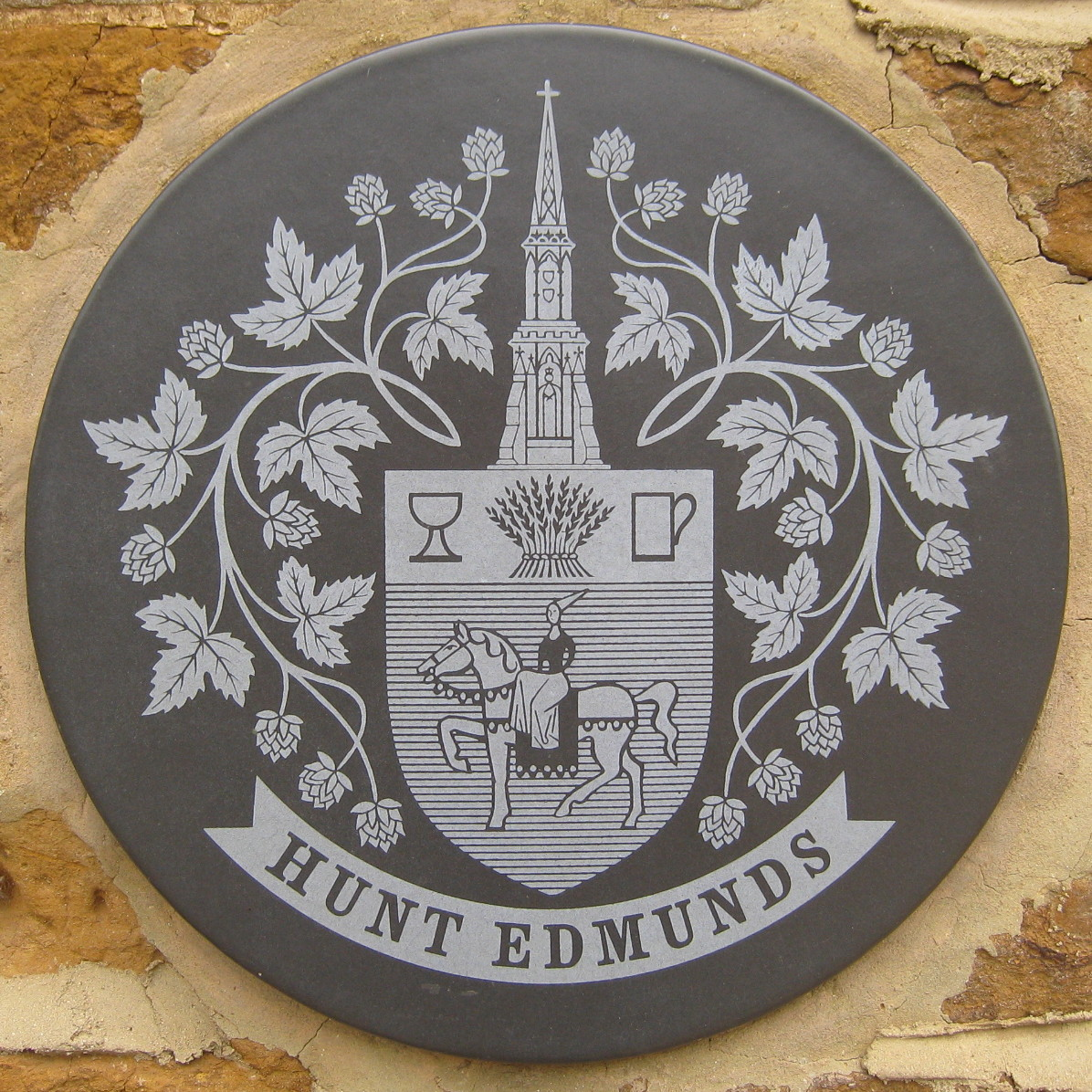
- Industry: Alcoholic beverage
- Founded: 1840
- Founder: John Hunt
- Successor: Bass, Mitchells & Butlers
- Headquarters: Banbury, England
- Products: Beer

Hunt Edmunds was a brewery in Banbury, Oxfordshire, England.

== History ==
The brewery was founded by John Hunt in 1840, but it was Thomas Hunt who went into partnership with William Edmunds (1826–1908) in 1850. Edmunds' son, Charles Fletcher Edmunds (1855–1907) became a partner in 1886, and succeeded his father in 1896. His son Maurice Edmunds (d. 1950) was a later chairman. Eventually the brewery had over 100 pubs. Other breweries in the town were taken over along with their pubs, including the former Austin's Brewery in North Bar, latterly owned by Messrs Dunnell; William Barrett's Britannia Brewery in Newland Road; and the Banbury Brewery Co. in Bridge Street.

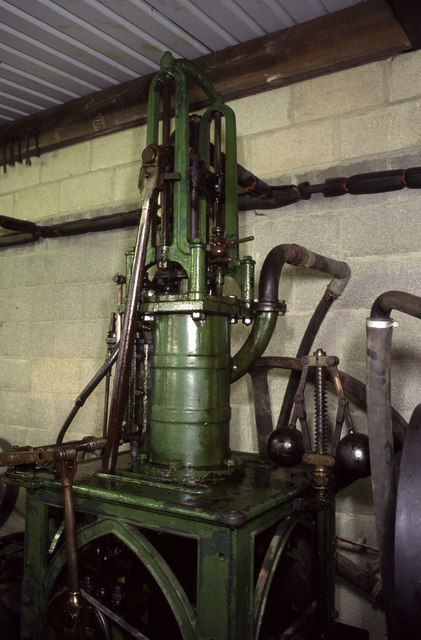
Steam table engine built by Lampitt of Banbury c1850 and used at the Hunt Edmunds brewery

By 1886 the company had two breweries and 64 tied houses in Banbury. The main brewery was on the southern side of Bridge Street, Banbury, and extended all the way back to George Street. Brews included "Banbury Best Bitter", "Banbury Brown Ale" and "Banbury Cross Ale". Other breweries were taken over, including the Banbury Brewery Company (acquired in 1879), Barrett's of Banbury (acquired 1884), Hudson's of Witney, Hunt's of Burford and the last competitor in Banbury, Dunnell & Co. (acquired 1918). In 1924, the brewer Hitchman & Co of Chipping Norton was taken over, and operated through a holding company, Hunt Edmunds Hitchman Co Ltd; the brewery at Chipping Norton was closed in 1931 and brewing transferred to Banbury. In 1951, Hunt Edmunds claimed that they supplied beer to pubs in seven different counties.

Bass, Mitchells & Butlers absorbed Hunt Edmunds in the 1960s. Demolition followed, with the chimney coming down in 1974. Few buildings remain; the "Crown" public house towards the east of Bridge Street, which was the "tap" outlet for the brewery, with "black and white" architecture, is the subject of a redevelopment proposal.

The public houses usually bore a plaque that was normally on the outside wall beside the main door. There were two types: slate with the design etched into the stone, or ceramic with the design in blue on a white background. After Mitchells & Butlers took over the brewery in the 1960s, these plaques were either painted over or removed, but several have since been cleaned. They may be seen on pubs both in Banbury and north Oxfordshire, and as distant as Bridgend, Wales.
