= Combe Mill =

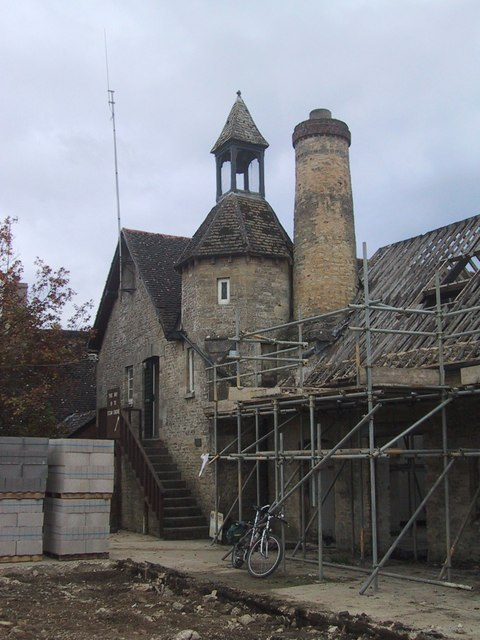

- Location within Oxfordshire
- 51°49′56.64″N 1°23′48.3″W
- Type: Sawmill
- Location: Long Hanborough
- OS grid reference: SP 41660 15041

History
- Built: 1852

Site notes
- Area: Oxfordshire
- Governing body: Combe Mill Society
- Owner: Blenheim Palace Estate

Listed Building – Grade II*
- Official name: Combe Mill
- Designated: 29 June 1988
- Reference no.: 1053004

Combe Mill is a historic sawmill adjacent to the River Evenlode and close to Combe railway station, between the villages of Combe and Long Hanborough in Oxfordshire, England. A Grade II* listed building, it was restored in the early 1970s and is open to the public.

== History ==
The mill was built in 1852 as the workshop for the Blenheim Palace Estate, replacing an early 17th-century flour mill sold to George Spencer, 4th Duke of Marlborough in 1766.

The mill was originally powered by a waterwheel. In 1886, a beam engine and Cornish boiler were installed to allow operation when the river's flow was low. The engine stopped working around 1922 and lay idle until its restoration. The wood waterwheel was replaced in 1934 with a metal one, and the shaft replaced by the present timber one. The waterwheel was the mill's principal source of power for about 40 years, except for a time during World War I when the government installed auxiliary stationary steam engines, and the mill was commandeered by the War Office to produce props and duck-boards for use in the battlefield trenches. In the 1950s, electric power was brought to the mill and the waterwheel became less important. When it ceased to be used in the mid-1960s, the leat was filled in and sluices buried.

=== Restoration ===
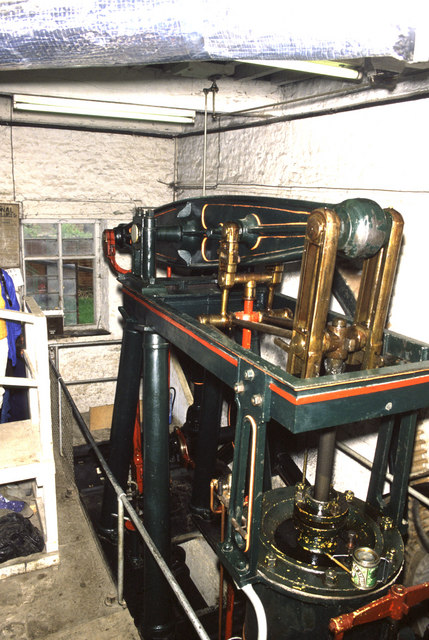
Beam engine at Combe Mill

In 1969, a working party from the City and County Museum (now the County Museum) at Woodstock surveyed the site and began negotiations with the Duke of Marlborough to restore the beam engine and boiler; and in September 1972, the engine was successfully steamed for the first time in sixty years. The Combe Mill Society was formed, and the mill opened to the public in 1975. Since then, other parts of the mill have been restored.

The mill still contains several historic trade catalogues from which hardware was once selected for use around the estate. It also has several day books from the mid-19th century, showing the names of workers and details of their earnings and day-to-day jobs.

== Access ==
The mill is open between March and October, and is in steam on the third Sunday of those months. Schools and community groups may book visits at any time. The mill has a working forge, where visitors have the opportunity to make their own fireplace pokers.
