= Dorchester Abbey Museum =

Local museum in Dorchester-on-Thames, England

Coordinates: 51.643633°N 1.165364°W

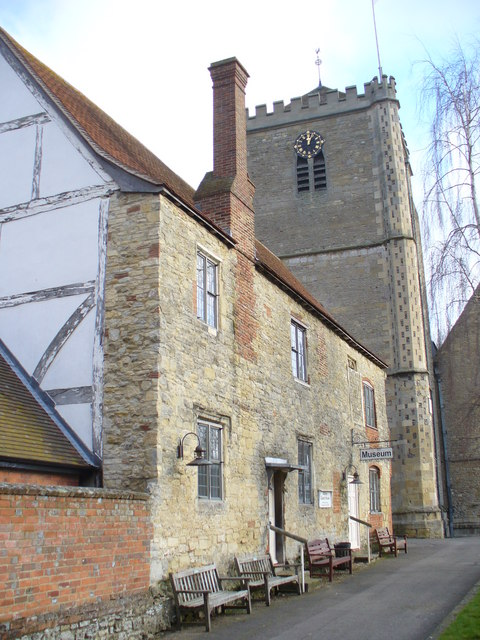
Dorchester Abbey Museum.

Dorchester Abbey Museum is a local museum in the village of Dorchester, Oxfordshire, England. It is attached to Dorchester Abbey.

The museum occupies two buildings on the site of Dorchester Abbey. The Old Schoolroom, part of the former 14th-century guest house of the abbey, has displays of artefacts, illustrations and maps concerning the history of Dorchester and its surroundings. The area has been inhabited for over 6,000 years. It also houses a historical archive. The Cloister Gallery is a new gallery on the northern wall of the Abbey, built in 2001. It displays a permanent exhibition, "If Stones Could Speak", presenting the Abbey using its collection of carved and moulded medieval stonework.

The museum was short-listed for the 2006 Gulbenkian Prize for the Cloister Gallery.
