= OMC Shipping =

Ship company in Singapore

OMC Shipping pted. ltd.
- Company type: Sogo shosha
- Industry: Shipping
- Founded: 2010; 16 years ago
- Headquarters: Singapore
- Key people: (Group CEO)
- Products: Ship owner
- Website: http://www.omcs.com.sg/

OMC Shipping pte. ltd., also known as OMCS, is a Singapore based ship owning company. It is the ship owning arm of Mitsui & Co., one of the largest trading companies (sogo sosha) of Japan.

== Fleet ==
OMC owns, operates and manages a fleet of 19 ships. This includes bulk carriers (handy size to cape size), oil tankers (product and crude oil), car carriers (PCTC of size 8000 CEU) and container ships (up to 9700 TEU in size). The company also charters these ships out on time charters and voyage charters. The company also owns and operates additional ships on short and long-term charters.
