= Benson, Oxfordshire =

Village in South Oxfordshire, England

Coordinates: 51.621°N 1.111°W

Benson
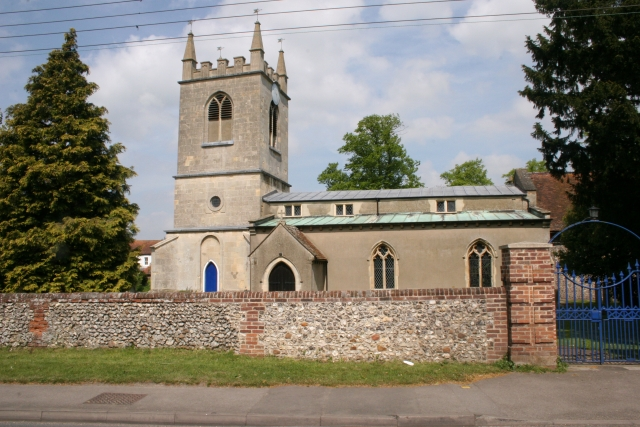
- St Helen's parish church

- Location within Oxfordshire
- Area: 9.84 km^{2} (3.80 sq mi)
- Population: 4,754 (2011 Census)
  - Density: 483/km^{2} (1,250/sq mi)
- OS grid reference: SU6191
- Civil parish: Benson
- District: South Oxfordshire
- Shire county: Oxfordshire
- Region: South East
- Country: England
- Sovereign state: United Kingdom
- Post town: Wallingford
- Postcode district: OX10
- Dialling code: 01491
- Police: Thames Valley
- Fire: Oxfordshire
- Ambulance: South Central
- UK Parliament: Henley and Thame

Benson is a village and civil parish in South Oxfordshire, England. The 2011 Census gave the parish population as 4,754. It lies about a mile and a half (2.4 km) north of Wallingford at the foot of the Chiltern Hills, where a chalk stream, Ewelme Brook, joins the River Thames next to Benson Lock.

== Geography ==
Benson, on the north and east banks of the Thames, was unaffected by the 1974 boundary changes between Berkshire and Oxfordshire. It rests on river silts and gravel, just above surrounding marshy land named in the nearby settlements of Preston Crowmarsh, Crowmarsh Gifford, and Rokemarsh. The fertile land surrounding Benson meant that farming was the main source of employment until the 20th century. The brook through the village is home to trout and to the invasive American signal crayfish.

=== Climate ===
The village lies in a well-known frost pocket, sometimes recording the lowest night-time temperatures in the UK. This climatic quirk may have led to the village playing a part in the development of modern meteorology, with a meteorological observatory being located there in the early 19th century.

Climate data for Benson (1991–2020 normals, extremes 1974-)
Month	Jan	Feb	Mar	Apr	May	Jun	Jul	Aug	Sep	Oct	Nov	Dec	Year
Record high °C (°F)	15.0 (59.0)	18.6 (65.5)	22.0 (71.6)	26.6 (79.9)	33.6 (92.5)	34.7 (94.5)	38.7 (101.7)	35.6 (96.1)	31.4 (88.5)	27.6 (81.7)	17.6 (63.7)	15.4 (59.7)	38.7 (101.7)
Mean daily maximum °C (°F)	7.7 (45.9)	8.3 (46.9)	11.0 (51.8)	14.0 (57.2)	17.2 (63.0)	20.3 (68.5)	22.8 (73.0)	22.3 (72.1)	19.3 (66.7)	14.9 (58.8)	10.7 (51.3)	8.1 (46.6)	14.8 (58.6)
Daily mean °C (°F)	4.4 (39.9)	4.6 (40.3)	6.6 (43.9)	8.9 (48.0)	12.0 (53.6)	15.0 (59.0)	17.2 (63.0)	16.9 (62.4)	14.3 (57.7)	10.9 (51.6)	7.1 (44.8)	4.6 (40.3)	10.2 (50.4)
Mean daily minimum °C (°F)	1.1 (34.0)	1.0 (33.8)	2.2 (36.0)	3.8 (38.8)	6.8 (44.2)	9.7 (49.5)	11.7 (53.1)	11.6 (52.9)	9.3 (48.7)	6.8 (44.2)	3.6 (38.5)	1.2 (34.2)	5.7 (42.3)
Record low °C (°F)	−18.7 (−1.7)	−12.5 (9.5)	−9.2 (15.4)	−8.1 (17.4)	−4.2 (24.4)	−0.3 (31.5)	2.5 (36.5)	2.1 (35.8)	−1.5 (29.3)	−6.9 (19.6)	−9.7 (14.5)	−17.8 (0.0)	−18.7 (−1.7)
Average precipitation mm (inches)	58.9 (2.32)	42.1 (1.66)	39.8 (1.57)	49.0 (1.93)	52.3 (2.06)	46.3 (1.82)	45.2 (1.78)	53.3 (2.10)	49.9 (1.96)	68.9 (2.71)	70.0 (2.76)	58.1 (2.29)	633.7 (24.95)
Average precipitation days (≥ 1.0 mm)	11.5	9.6	8.6	9.7	9.3	8.0	8.0	9.2	8.3	10.8	12.1	10.9	116.0
Mean monthly sunshine hours	59.1	76.4	117.2	168.3	208.5	208.4	228.1	201.4	148.7	108.5	66.4	53.7	1,644.8
Source 1: Met Office
Source 2: Starlings Roost Weather

== History ==
=== Etymology ===
The place-name Benson is first attested in the Anglo-Saxon Chronicle, which took its present form in the latter half of the ninth century, in the forms Bænesingtun and Benesingtun. Instances where the name is mentioned include the Battle of Bedcanford, which supposedly took place in 571 and led to Britons ceding Benson to someone called Cuthwulf, but the historicity of this event is uncertain. The name is thought to derive from a personal name Benesa, combined with the suffix -ing (here indicating Benesa's possession of the place), and the word tūn (meaning 'estate'). Thus it once meant "farmstead of Benesa". In the period 1140–1315 the name appears as Besinton (and similar forms), and Benston in 1526. The present form of the name, Benson, appears early in the nineteenth century, but Bensington continued in use, at least in formal documents, into the second half of the century. The 1866 Working Agreement made by the Great Western Railway for its Wallingford–Watlington line used the older form.

=== Archaeology ===
Evidence of human presence has been found dating back to the Mesolithic period – about 10,000 BCE. The village occupies the site of an ancient British town known also to have been occupied in the Roman period, although Benson's written history dates back only to 571 CE Recent excavation for a housing site at the junction of St Helen's Avenue and Church Road revealed evidence of early Neolithic (3500 BCE) and later Bronze Age or early Iron Age (11th – 8th centuries BCE) pits and post holes, with a possible later Bronze Age roundhouse and three early or mid-Saxon (5th – 6th centuries CE) sunken-floored buildings.

=== Medieval manor ===
In 779 the estate was, according to the Anglo-Saxon Chronicle. taken from Wessex by Offa of Mercia following the Battle of Bensington. It was certainly a royal manor by the 880s. At the time of the 1086 Domesday Book, Benson was "the richest royal manor in Oxfordshire". The manor boundaries ran from the borders of Stadhampton in the north to include Henley in the south-east and were probably set long before the Conquest. Domesday rates that manor at £85 a year, although it comprised only 11.75 hides, while the Bishop of Lincoln's 90 hides at Dorchester were valued at only £30. Benson itself was clearly the most valuable part of the manor. The map shows Benson parish as only about a tenth of the area of Benson manor, but Domesday values it alone at £30, compared with £5 for the neighbouring parish of Berrick.

=== Parish church ===
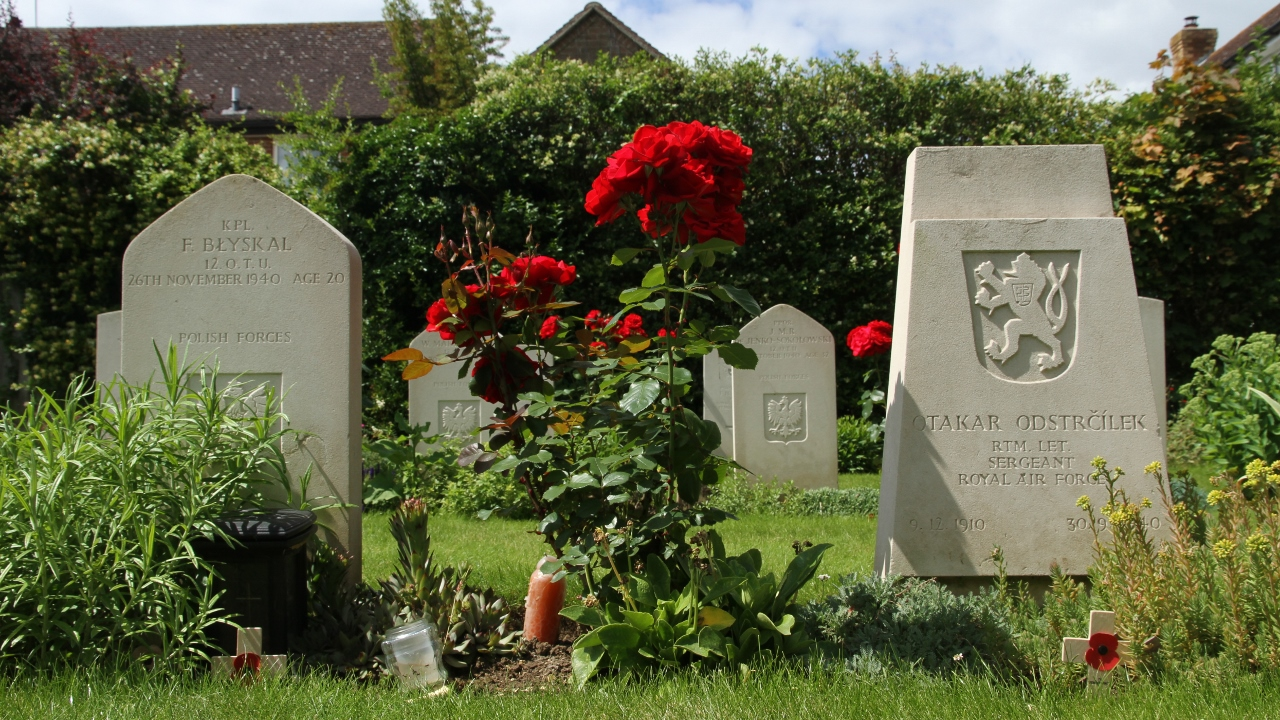
Second World War graves of Polish and Czechoslovak airmen in the extension of St Helen's parish churchyard

The Church of England parish church of St Helen is partly ancient. John Marius Wilson described it: "variously late pointed Norman and decorated; has a modern tower; contains a Norman font and two [monumental] brasses; and is very good." The church parish includes the hamlets of Fifield and Crowmarsh-Battle or Preston-Crowmarsh. The village is often confused with RAF Benson, which is a well-known RAF station and airfield. The airfield boundary is adjacent to the village, and the aerodrome's construction closed the former "London Road". The RAF buildings are on the opposite side of the airfield to Benson village, adjacent to the village of Ewelme.

The church tower was rebuilt in 1794. It has a single clock-face on the east-facing side, with hours displayed in Roman numerals. The clock face erroneously has the nine o'clock marker marked as "XI", as is the eleven o'clock marker correctly. This mistake gained fame in the Second World War when Germany's English-speaking propaganda broadcaster, William Joyce (Lord Haw Haw) promised an air raid on "an airfield near the village whose clock had two elevens". RAF Benson was bombed soon afterwards.

The bell tower has a ring of eight bells. Six, including the tenor and treble, were cast in 1781 by Thomas Janaway of Chelsea. The current second and third bells were added by Whitechapel Bell Foundry: the second was cast by Charles and George Mears in 1852 and the third by Mears and Stainbank in 1922. In October 2009 White's of Appleton replaced the original oak bell frame of 1794 with a modern steel frame. White's refurbished the bells and fitted new headstocks for the new steel frame.

=== Social and economic history ===
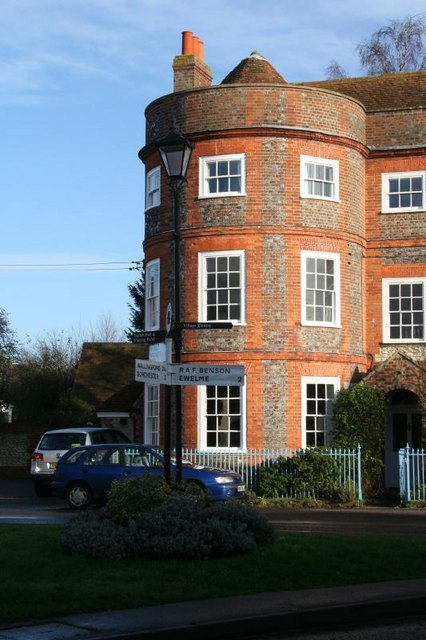
13 Castle Square, a mid-18th-century house

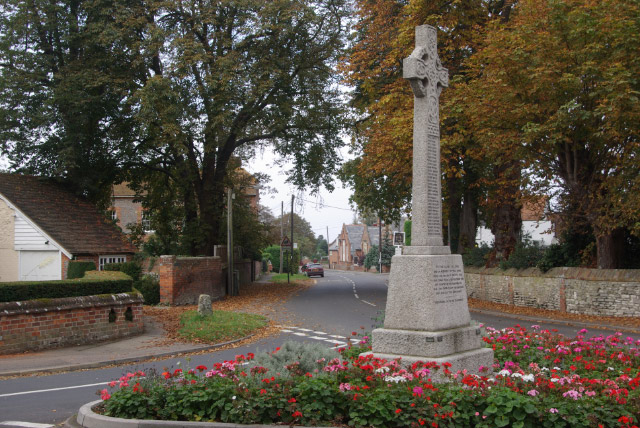
Benson war memorial

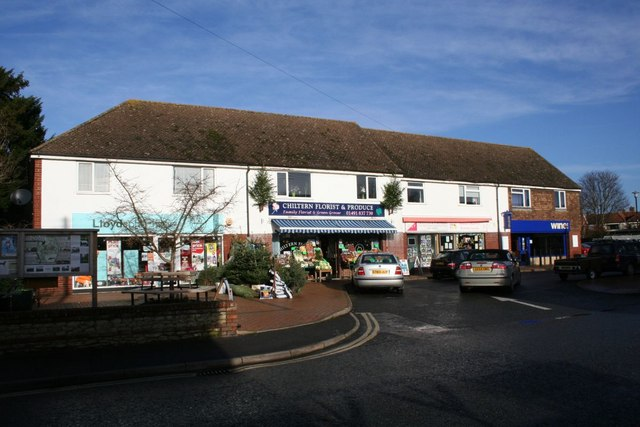
Row of shops in the High Street

Benson is one of several key South Oxfordshire sites of the English Civil War, lying between the site of the Battle of Chalgrove Field (18 June 1643) and Wallingford Castle. It was reputedly the last Royalist stronghold to surrender, being close to the Royalist cities of Oxford and Newbury. A building at Benson is still known as the Court House from the time King Charles I held court there on his way to Oxford. A flash lock was installed on the Thames at Benson in 1746. Benson weir collapsed in 1783, necessitating the construction of Benson pound lock in 1788. The lock was rebuilt in 1870.

The road between Henley-on-Thames and Dorchester on Thames became a turnpike in 1736 and in the 18th and early 19th centuries Benson was an important staging post for coaches between London and Oxford via Henley. Its broad open square was surrounded by coaching inns. At its peak the village had four large inns, ten smaller alehouses and a blacksmith. The 1844 opening of the Oxford branch of the GWR rapidly reduced coach traffic: within ten years only three Oxford-London coaches a week were still running through. The Henley–Dorchester road ceased to be a turnpike in 1873.

The decline in coaching, the enclosures and the agricultural depression explain a fall in population from 1253 in 1841 to 1157 by 1861. Failure to extend the Cholsey and Wallingford Railway to Watlington, via a station at Benson on an embankment north of Littleworth Road and close to the junction with Oxford Road, left the village increasingly isolated, as passenger transport between London and Oxford largely followed a railway line that ran nowhere near the once-prominent coaching stop. The village recovered as motor coaches and private cars became more important, leading to a number of roadhouse-type cafes – the early 20th-century equivalents of coaching inns.

== Amenities ==
Benson today is a commuter village, despite its lack of a railway station and distance from the motorways M4 and M40. It has a Church of England primary school in Oxford Road. A separate infant school was built at the top of Westfield Road in 1972 "to relieve congestion at the Oxford Road school", but early in the new millennium, the infant department returned to Oxford Road, allowing the Westfield Road site to be sold for a housing development known as Millar Close. There is also a pre-school.

The village has a doctor's surgery and two public houses: an 18th-century coaching inn, The Crown Inn, and the Three Horseshoes. The pub number is down from five in 1990, those closed having become private homes. There are about a dozen shops, including a supermarket and a dispensing chemist. A garage on the main Oxford road outside the village has an on-site McDonald's with drive-through and a Marks and Spencer food outlet, but the Vauxhall main car dealership there has closed.

The village play area reopened in 2021, dedicated to a local teenager, Faye Elizabeth Grundy. Aircraft noise in the area can be marked, which lowers property values compared with many surrounding villages.

== Notable people ==
- Reginald Lee, lookout aboard RMS Titanic, who was on duty at the time of the collision, was born in Benson.

== In popular media ==
In 1993 the River Thames at Benson was one of the primary filming locations for Episode 7 of Series 3 of the BBC sitcom Keeping up Appearances.

== See also ==
- Benson Veteran Cycle Museum

== Sources ==
- Burtt, J; Clarke, P (2004). Benson: A Century of Change: 1900–2000. Wallingford: Pie Powder Press.
- Karau, P; Turner, C (1982). The Wallingford Branch. Wild Swan Publications.
- Rowley, Trevor (1978). Villages in the Landscape. Archaeology in the Field Series. London: J.M. Dent & Sons Ltd. p. 149. ISBN 0-460-04166-5.
- Salzman, L.F., ed. (1939). A History of the County of Oxford. Victoria County History. Vol. 1: Natural history, etc. London: Oxford University Press for the University of London Institute of Historical Research.
- Sherwood, Jennifer; Pevsner, Nikolaus (1974). Oxfordshire. The Buildings of England. Harmondsworth: Penguin Books. pp. 821–822. ISBN 0-14-071045-0.
- Tiller, Kate, ed. (1999). Benson: A Village Through its History. Wallingford: Pie Powder Press. ISBN 0-948598-10-7.
- Wilson, John Marius (1870–72). Imperial Gazetteer of England and Wales. London & Edinburgh: A Fullarton & Co.
