= Museum of Oxford =

History museum in Oxford, England

Coordinates: 51°45′6″N 1°15′26″W

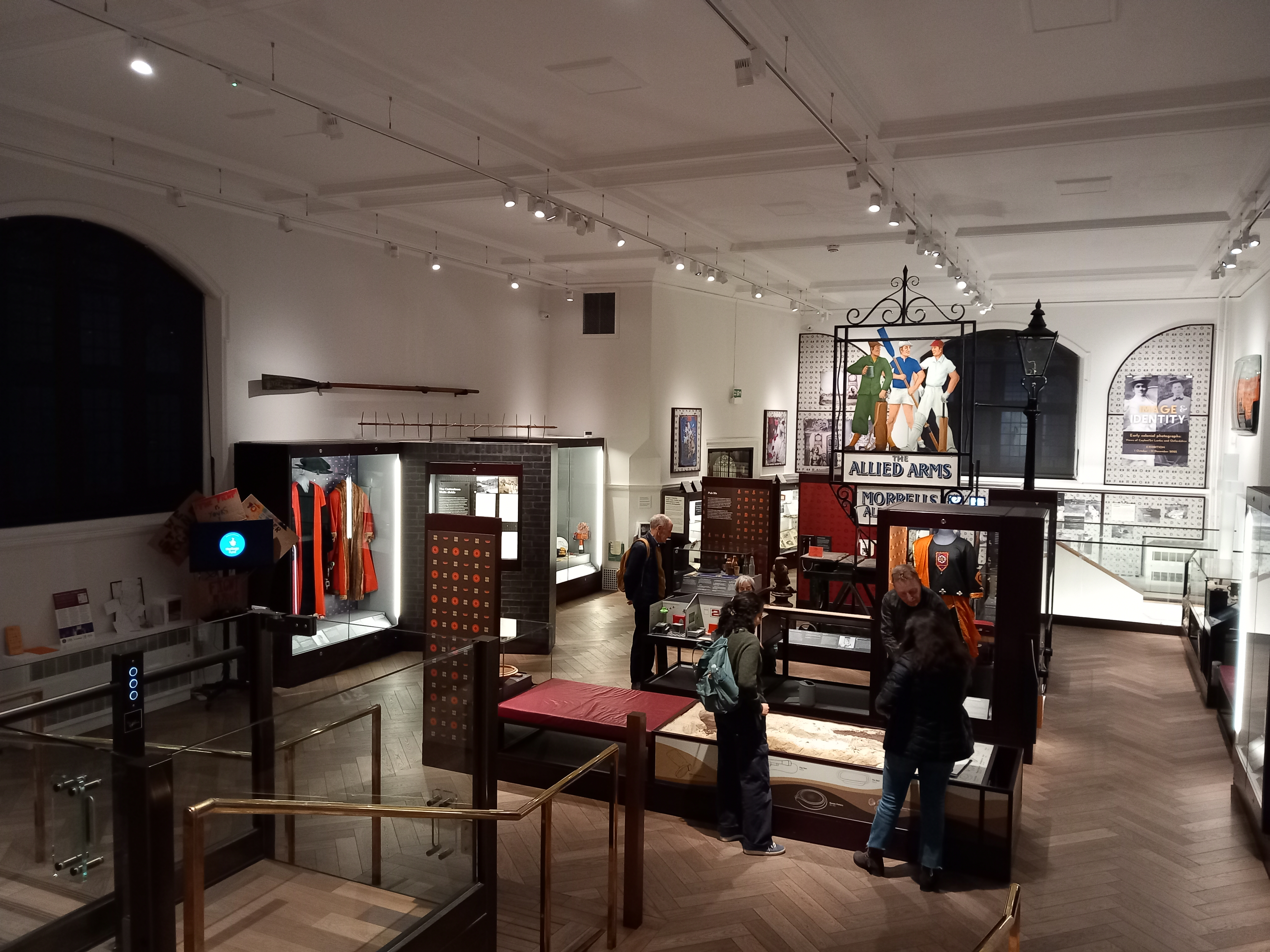

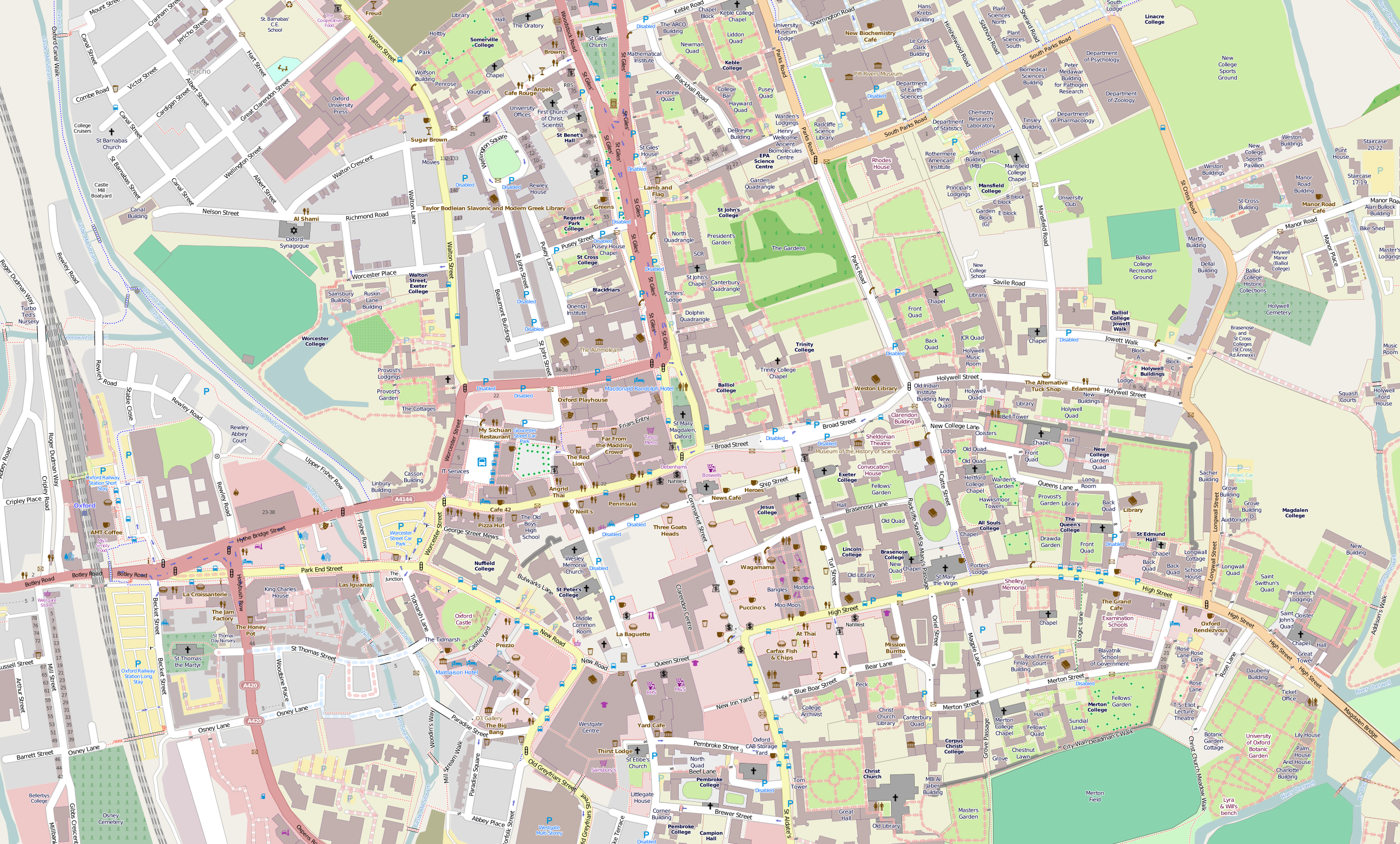
- Location within Oxford
- Established: 1975
- Location: St Aldate's. Oxford, England, OX1 1DZ
- Type: Local history museum, archaeology, & social history
- Collection size: 750 exhibits
- Architect: Museum housed inside building designed by Henry Hare in the Jacobethan style
- Owner: Museum of Oxford Development Trust Registered Charity No. 1173867
- Website: museumofoxford.org

The Museum of Oxford (MOX) is a history museum in Oxford, England, covering the history of the city and its people. The museum includes both permanent and temporary displays featuring artefacts relating to Oxford's history from prehistoric times to the present day. The museum also acts as a public meeting space which people and organisations rent for both public and private events. Other activities facilitated by the museum include frequent public talks by historians and local cultural organisations, organised school tours, family activities, adult learning workshops, and an older people's program.

The museum is in Oxford city centre, inside Oxford Town Hall on St Aldate's Street.

== History of the museum ==
The Museum of Oxford was first opened in 1975 inside Oxford Town Hall, occupying the former premises of the Oxford Public Library.

In 2005 the museum was awarded a financial grant by the Big Lottery funding scheme Home Front Recall. This project aimed to collect and preserve memories of the Second World War from residents in Oxfordshire to commemorate the 60th anniversary of the war's end. In 2009 Oxford City Council considered closing the Museum of Oxford to save money, as the upkeep of the museum was costing £200,000 annually. However, the closure was opposed by the Oxford Civic Society, who campaigned for its continuation and helped the museum organise a rota of volunteers to keep the museum running at reduced cost.

In 2018 the museum acted as a temporary home to archaeological artefacts uncovered during the construction of Oxford's Westgate Shopping Centre.

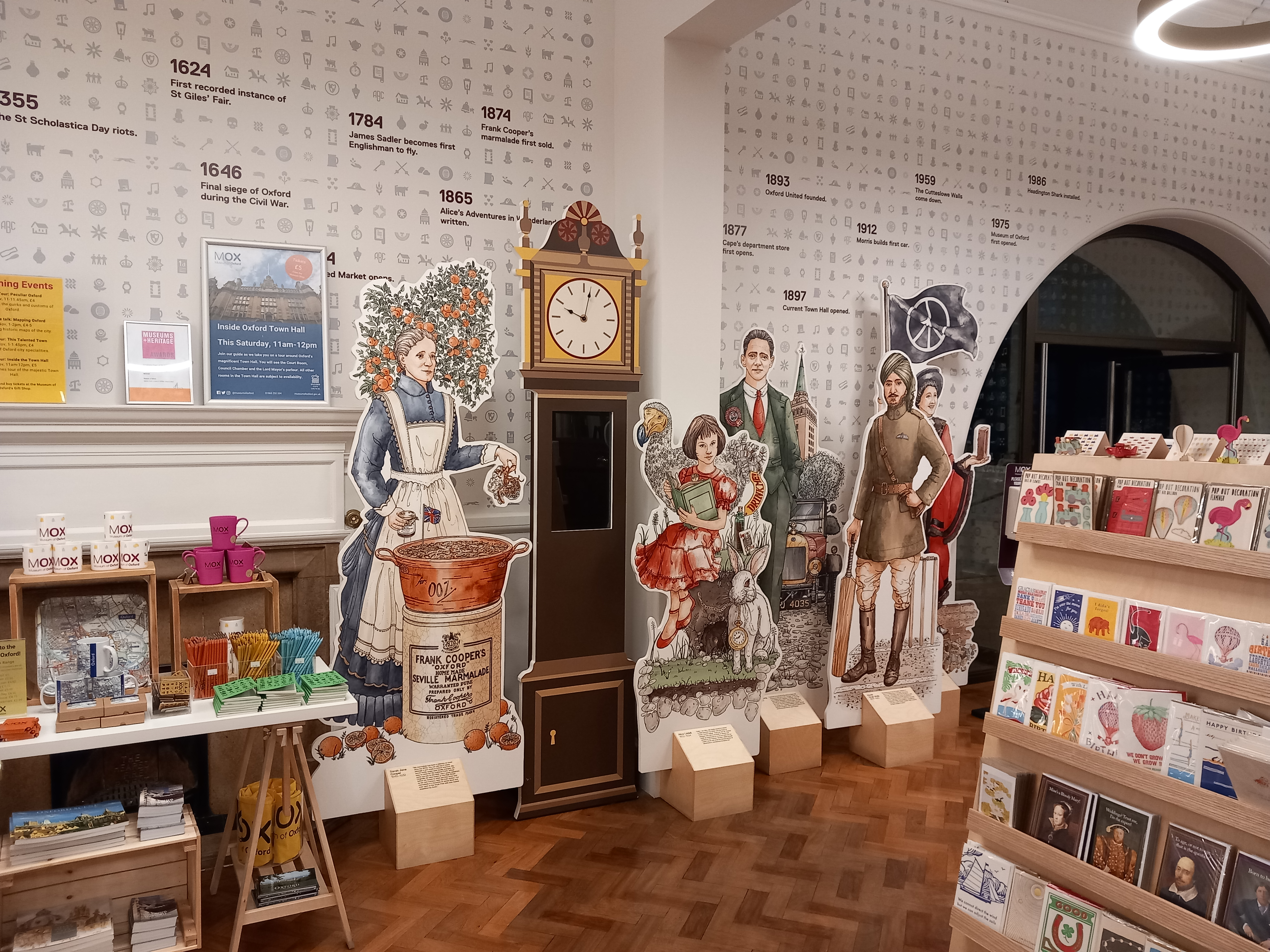
The museum gift shop

=== Refurbishment – 2018–2021 ===
From July 2018 to October 2021 the museum closed for a refurbishment which tripled the size of the museum space. The estimated cost of the refurbishment was £3.2 million, but the project was completed for £2.8 million by the architectural firm Purcell, and was funded by Arts Council England, the National Lottery Heritage Fund, and Oxford City Council. The refurbishment allowed an increase in the number of exhibits from 286 to around 750. In 2020, Oxford City Council leader Susan Brown suggested that Oriel College's controversial statue of Cecil Rhodes could be relocated to the Museum of Oxford.

=== Expansion – 2021–present ===
Since the 2021 October reopening, the museum has relied upon a network of over 100 volunteers. The museum also began hosting a series of workshops for schoolchildren to teach them about local history. Also in 2021, the museum won a National Lottery grant of £240,000 for its Hidden Histories project.

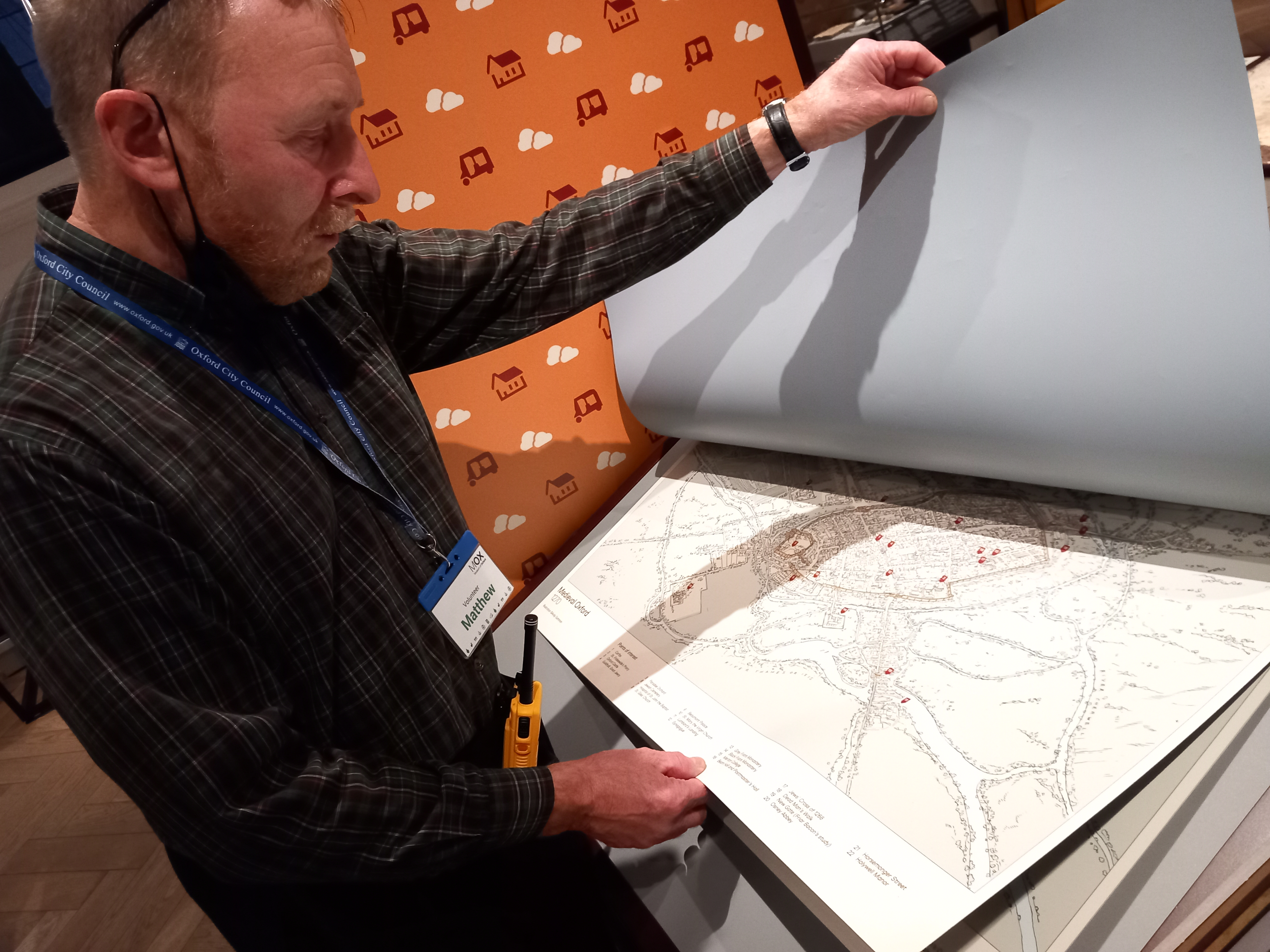
A MOX volunteer examines historic maps of Oxford

In 2022, the museum hosted a Digital Artist in Residence to create digital artworks featuring Oxfordshire's folklore and legends. The end result was an interactive videogame exploring pre-Christian British mythology.

In 2023, the Museum of Oxford became the first venue in Oxford city centre to host a performance of Little Edens, a theatrical production based on Oxford's Florence Park Rent Strikes in 1934.

== Themes ==
The Museum of Oxford focuses on the history and culture of the City of Oxford. In recent years there has been a shift towards creating more displays featuring Black British history and LGBTIQA+ history. In 2021, following the refurbishments, the museum unveiled a temporary Windrush display celebrating the history of Caribbean people in Oxford since the 1950s.

== Key exhibits ==
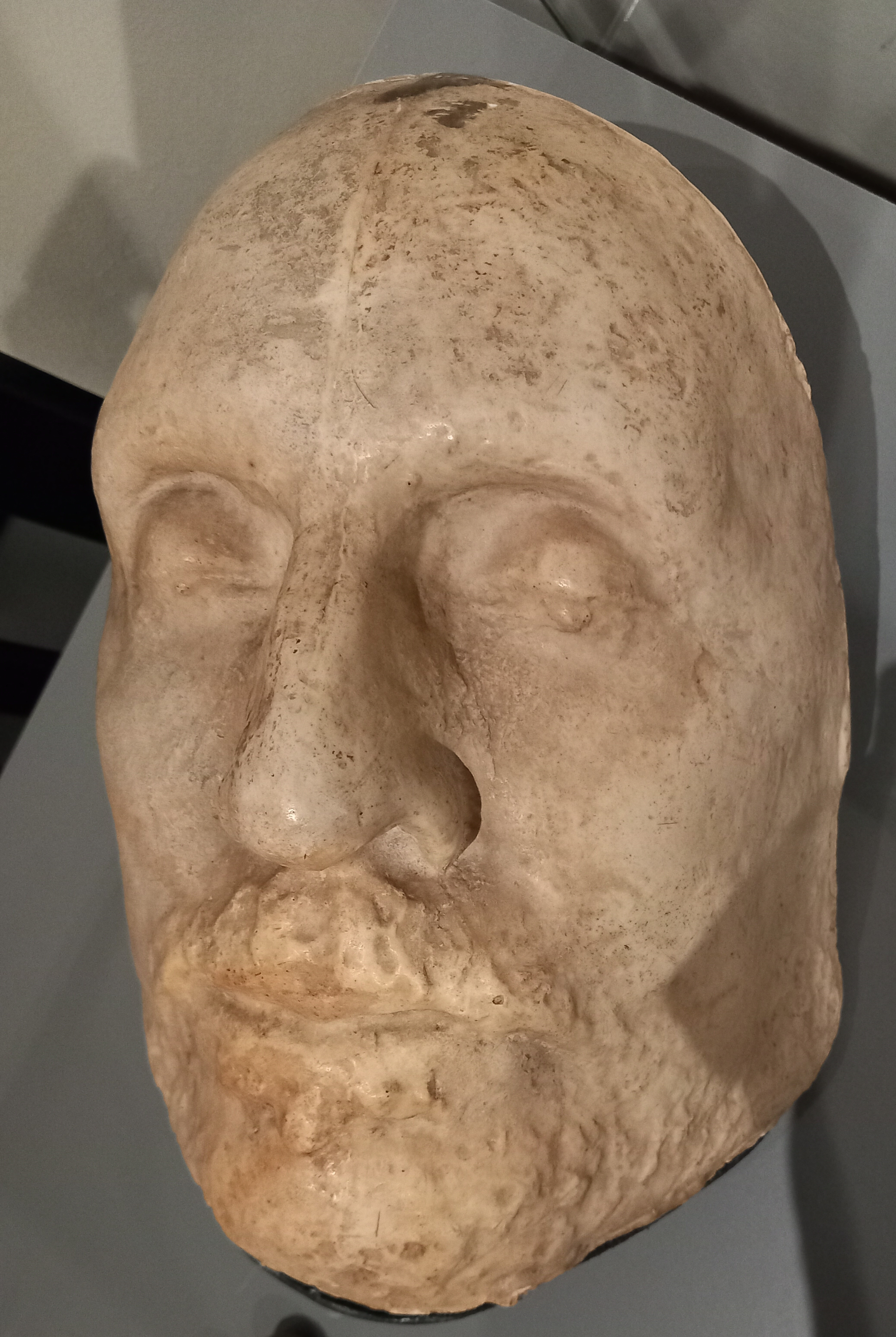
Oliver Cromwell's "death mask" displayed in the Museum of Oxford

Some of the museum's most notable items and exhibits include:

- Oliver Cromwell's death mask
- Artefacts from Oxford's Jewish quarter
- Oxford's city crest, gifted by Elizabeth I
- A chunk of the infamous Cutteslowe Wall
- Cold War artefacts for measuring nuclear fallout
- Tickets from The Rolling Stones' concert in Oxford
- A copy of Pink newspaper, Oxford's first LGBT newspaper
- Personal possessions of Lewis Carroll, author of Alice's Adventures in Wonderland
- Personal possessions of Alice Liddell, the inspiration for Alice of Alice's Adventures in Wonderland
- A tin of Frank Cooper's marmalade that was taken on Robert Falcon Scott's ill-fated journey to the South Pole

=== Temporary and online exhibits ===
Alongside permanent displays, the Museum of Oxford has hosted a number of temporary exhibits. Past examples have included Of Ordinary Things, featuring art by Iraqi women living in Oxford; and Queering Spires, which won the National Lottery's 'Sustainable Project of the Year Award'.

The museum facilitiates memory collecting events in which local people are encouraged to visit the museum to share items, photographs, and memories of their lives in Oxford. One such event was the Sporting Oxford Collecting Day in 2019, which encouraged residents to share memories of sports in Oxford. The museum also hosts occasional online displays, one of which was a project called City Stories in 2022 that sought to collect and preserve oral histories and photographs from the city's residents.

The museum also hosts temporary events parallel to wider Oxford celebrations, such as facilitating an arts and crafts workshop called Queenly Crafts as a part of Oxford's annual Alice Day celebrations.

== Gallery ==
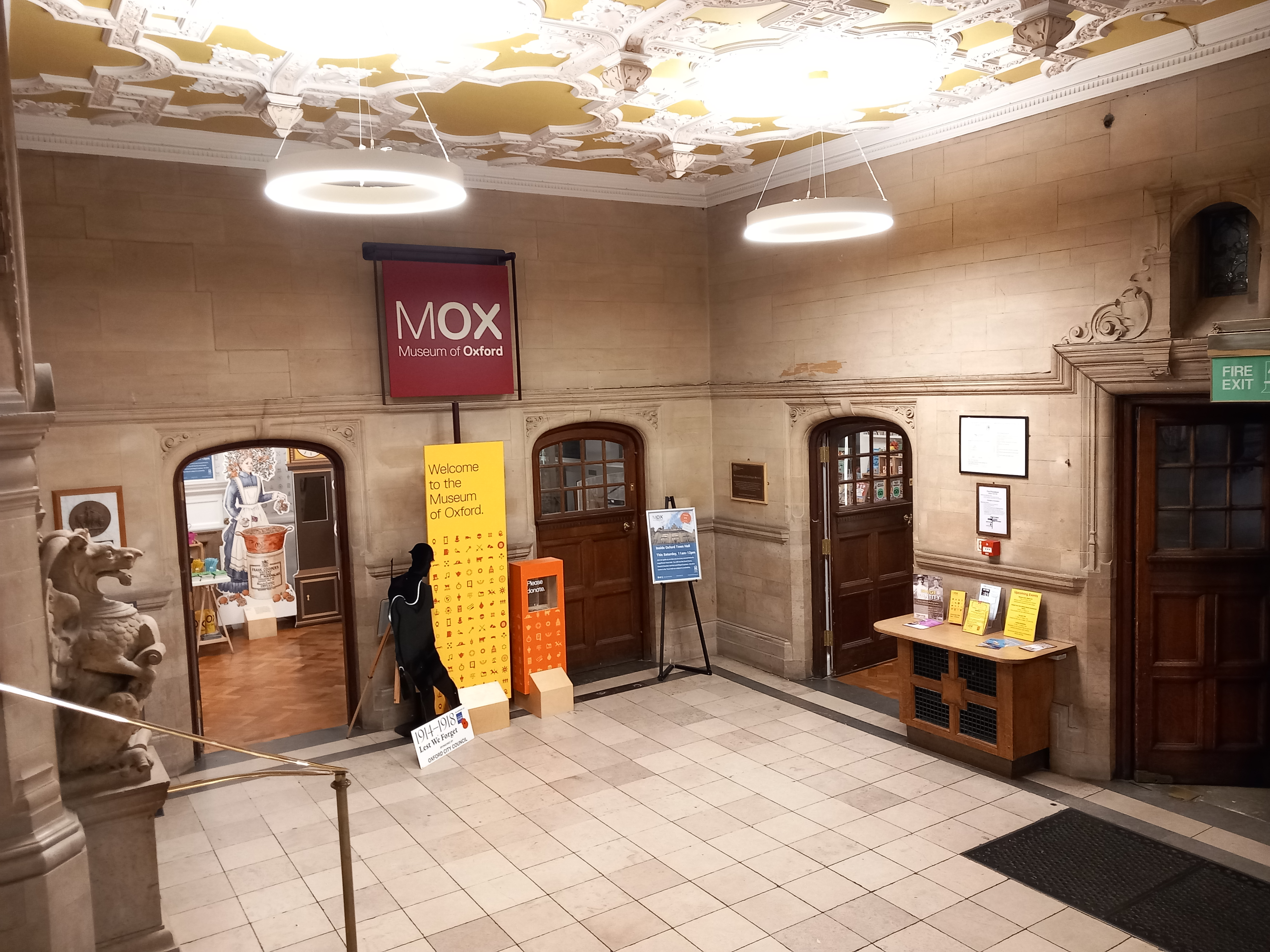
MOX entrance (inside town hall)

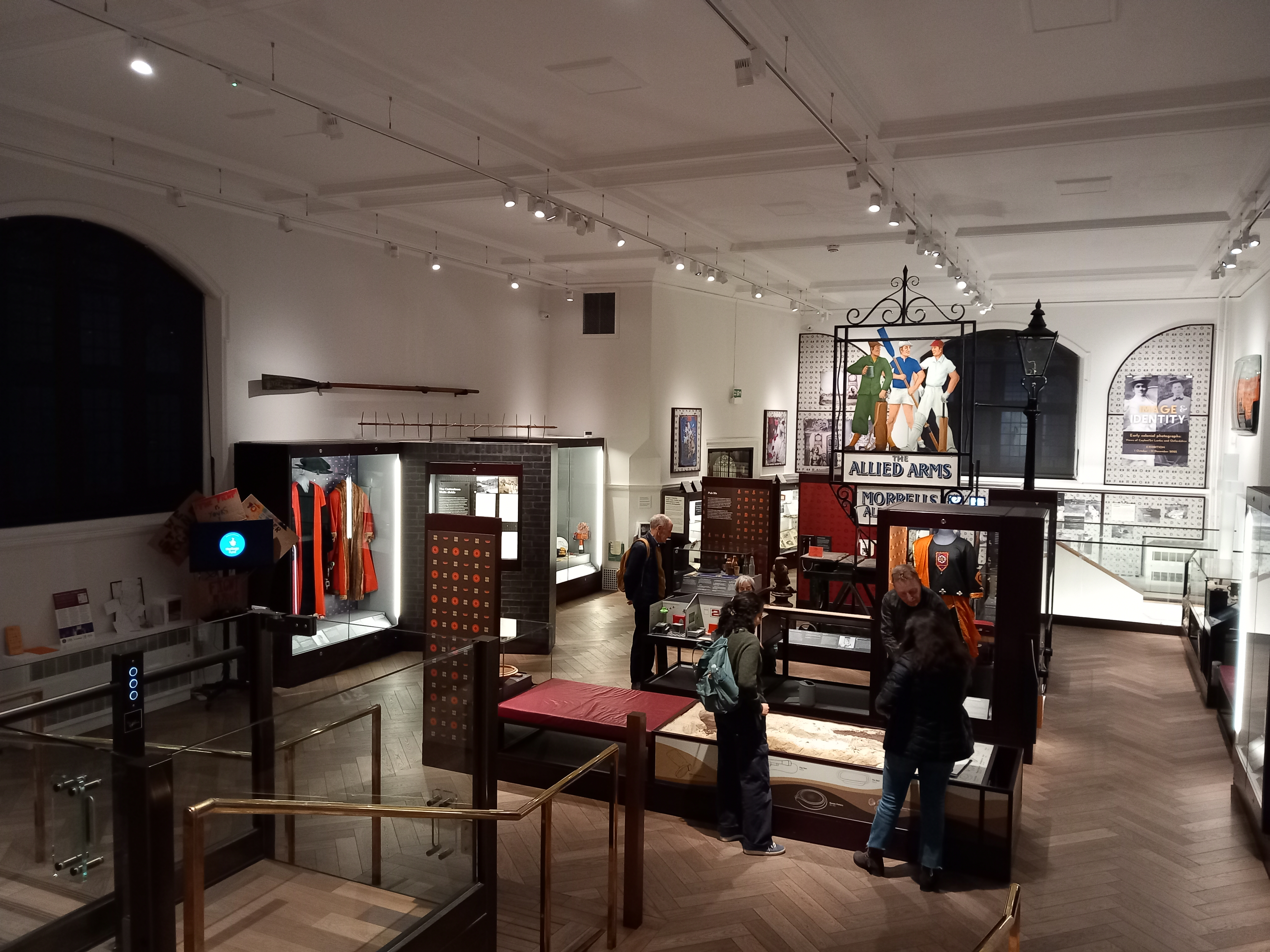
View of MOX main gallery from gift shop

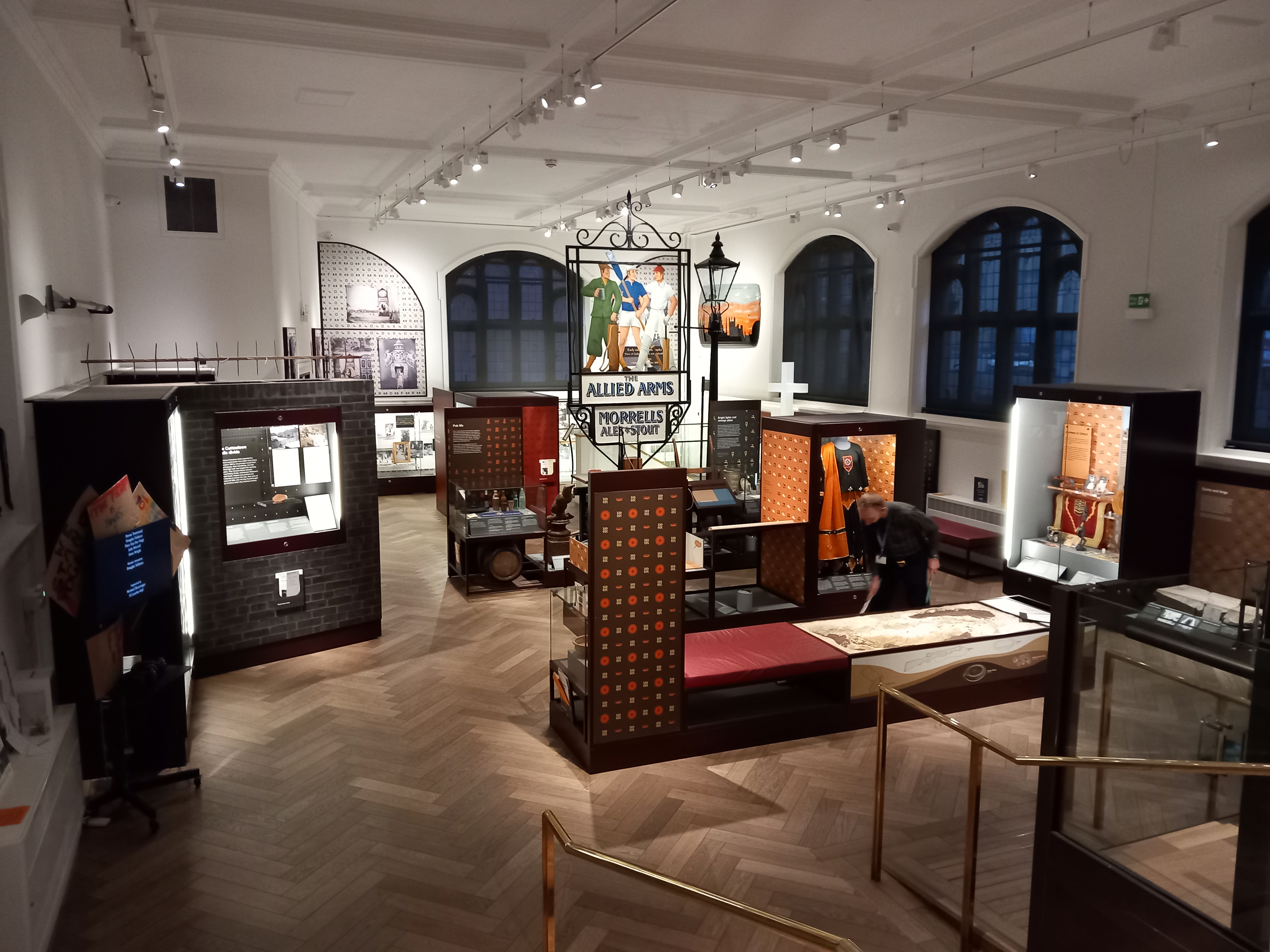
View of MOX main hall from seating area

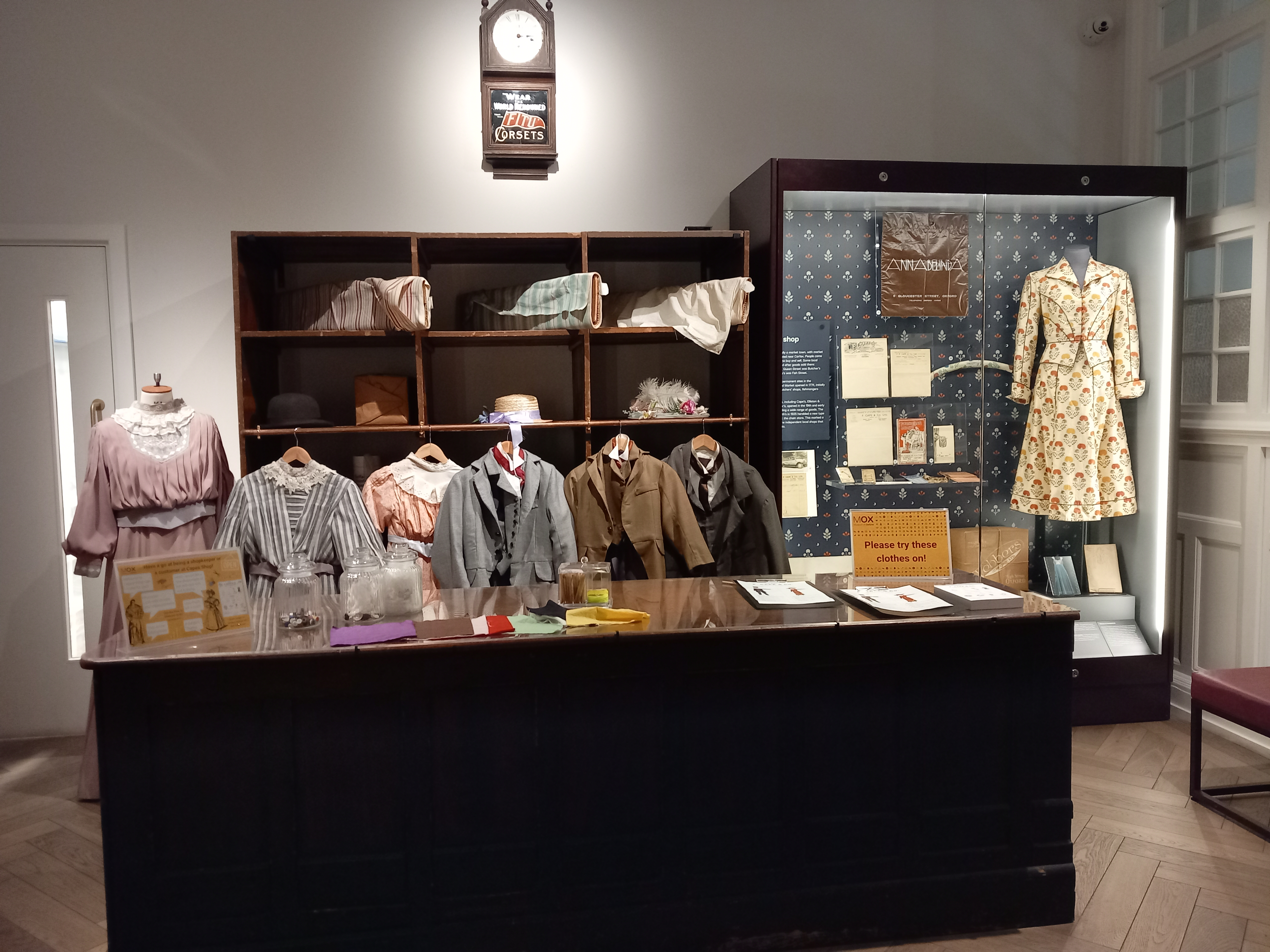
An interactive exhibit for trying on historic clothes

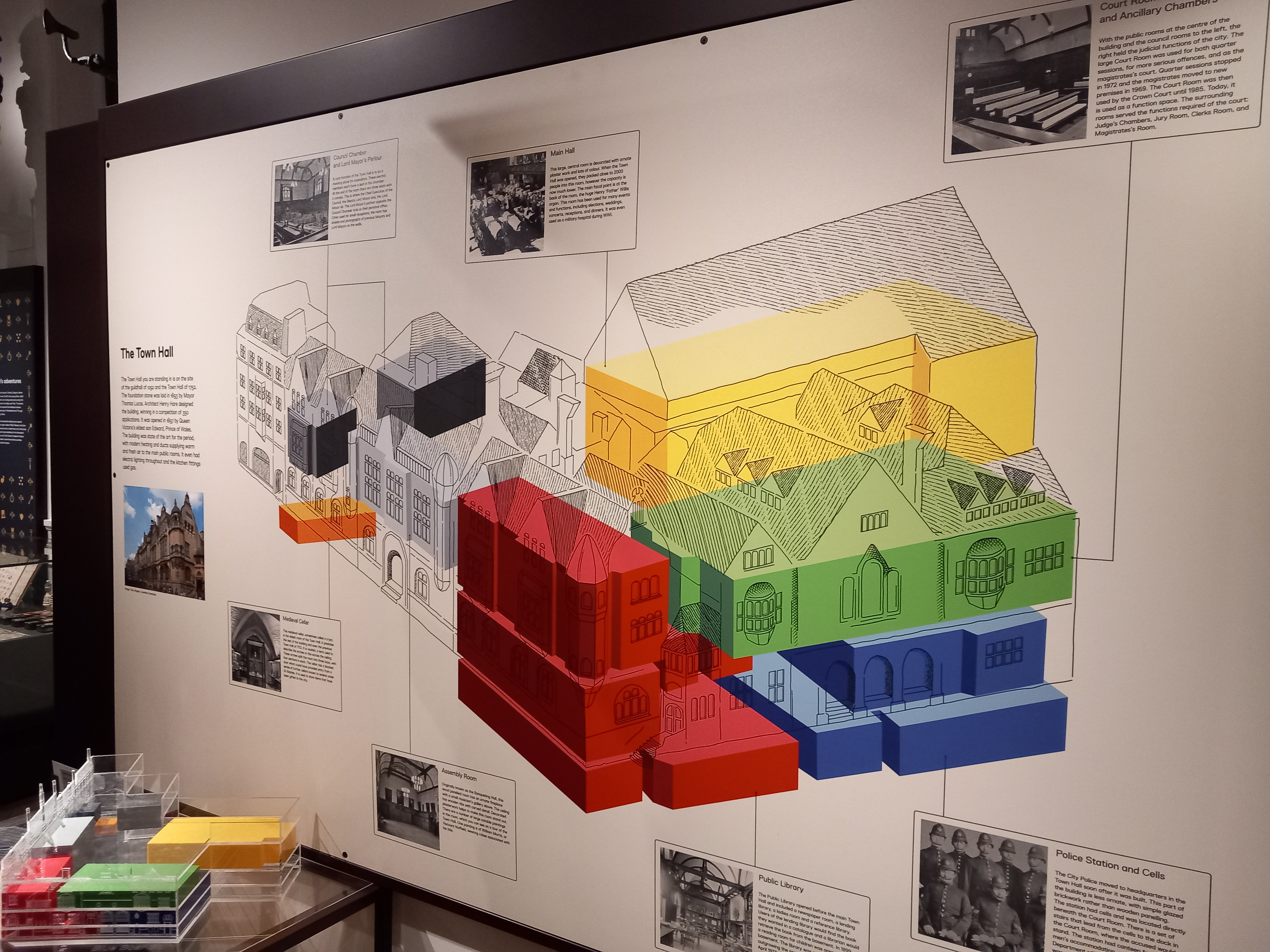
Map of Oxford Town Hall

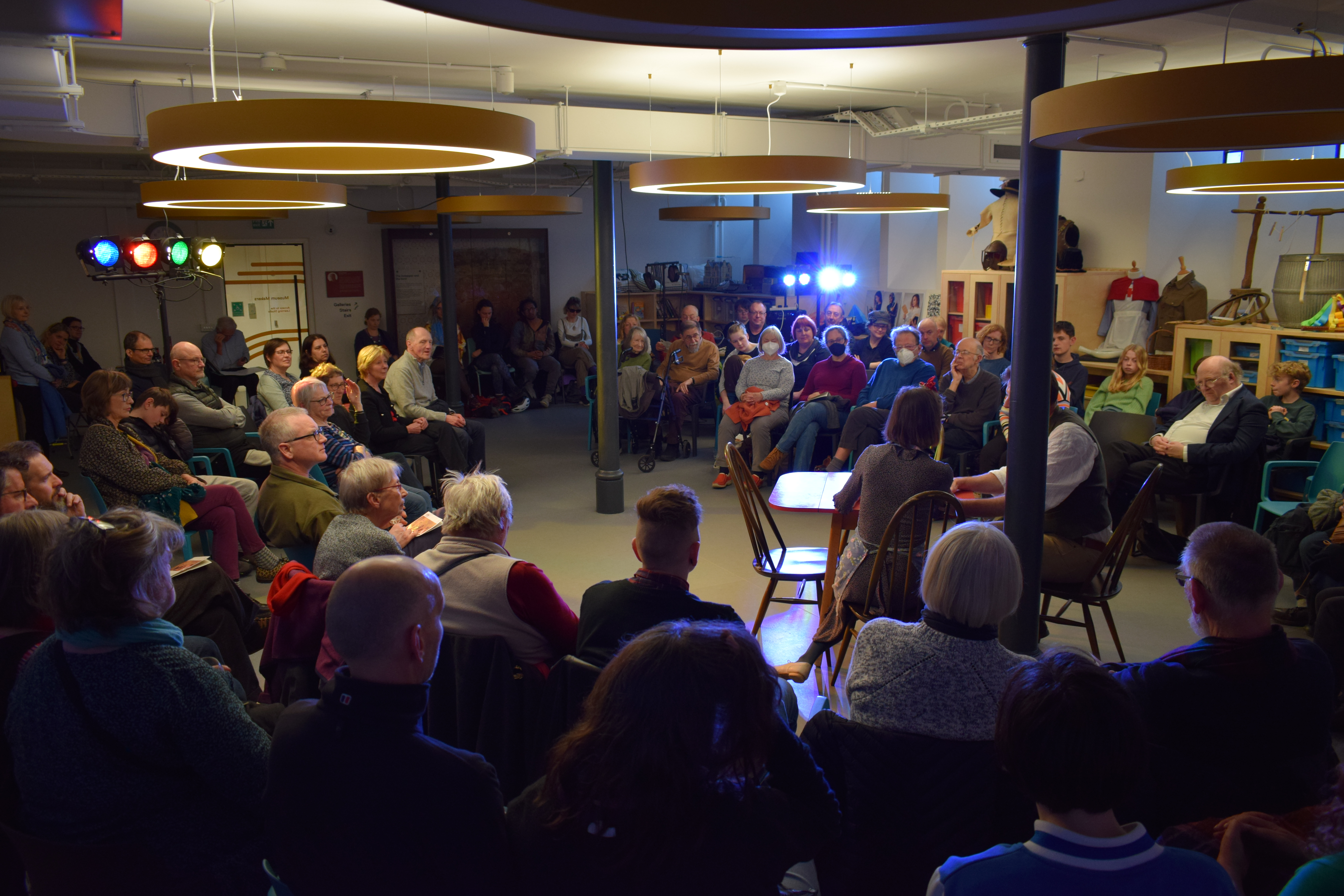
A performance of the historical drama Little Edens is performed in the Museum Makers Space

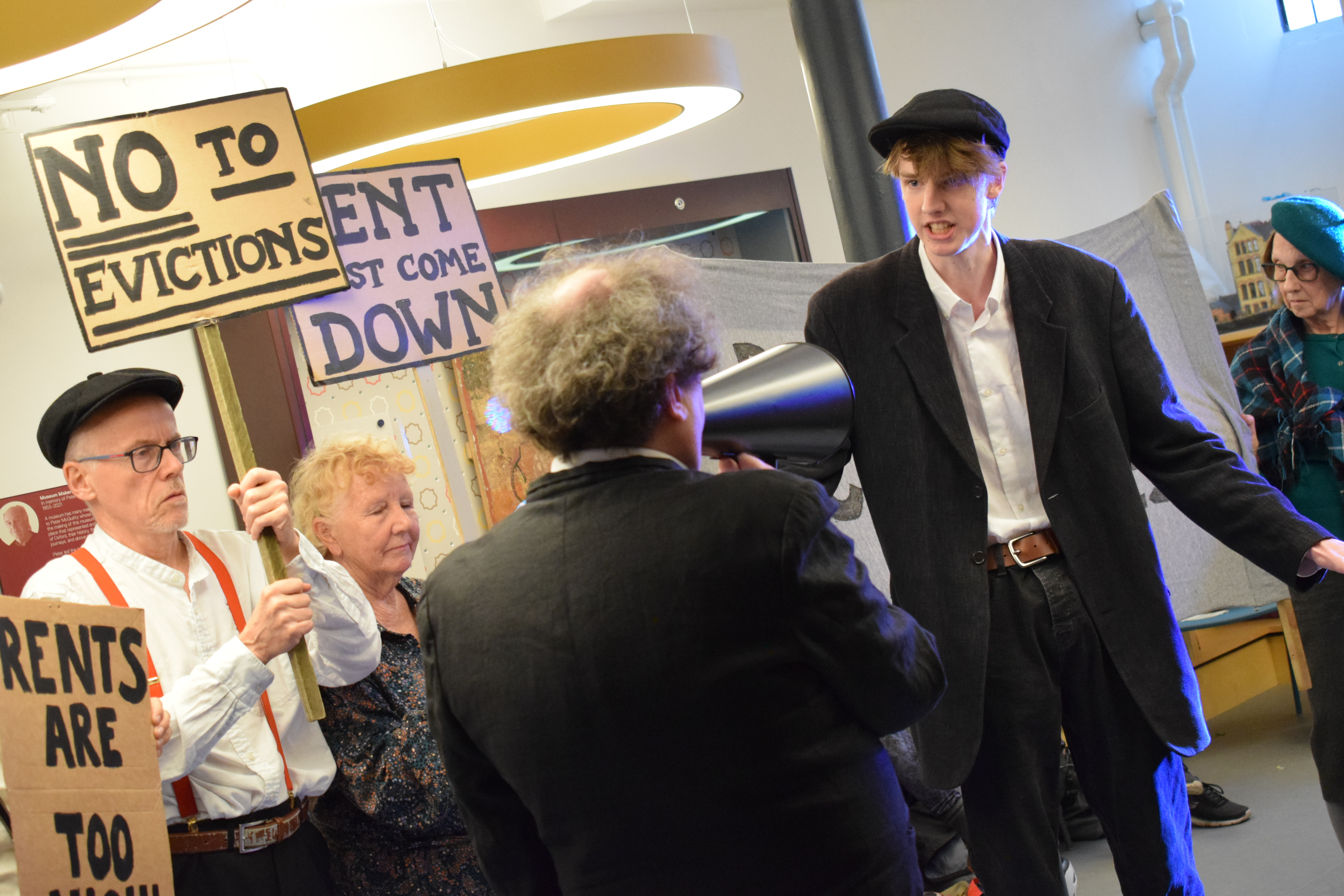
A Historical reenactment in the Museum of Oxford depicting activist Abraham Lazarus during the 1934 Florence Park rent strike

== Accessibility ==
Every room within the Museum of Oxford is wheelchair-accessible. This includes a lift to access both galleries and areas that are not ordinarily open to the public. However, the steps in front of the main entrance to Oxford Town Hall are not wheelchair-accessible, and disabled visitors will need to enter via an alternative entrance. Most display cases are designed so that they can be viewed from wheelchair height.

Admission to the museum is free and the galleries are open every day except Sundays and holidays.

== Rented spaces ==
The basement areas of the Museum of Oxford hold two meeting halls which the museum rents for both public and private events. The largest room is called the Museum Makers Space, the smallest is called the Learning Studio. Also available is a kitchenette, museum props, Wi-Fi, furniture, baby changing areas, gender neutral toilets, and on-site catering.

== See also ==
- Soldiers of Oxfordshire Museum
- Pitt Rivers Museum
- Ashmolean Museum
- Abingdon County Hall Museum
- Vale and Downland Museum
