= List of places in Oxfordshire =

Some of the larger settlements of Oxfordshire.

This is a list of settlements in both the non-metropolitan shire and ceremonial county of Oxfordshire, England.

Places marked ¹ were in the administrative county of Berkshire before the boundary changes of 1974. They are within the historic county boundaries of Berkshire. See also the list of places transferred from Berkshire to Oxfordshire in 1974.

== A ==
Abingdon¹, Adderbury, Adwell, Albury, Alchester, Alkerton, Alvescot, Ambrosden, Appleford-on-Thames¹, Appleton¹, Appleton-with-Eaton, Ardington, Ardington Wick, Ardley, Arncott, Ascott d'Oyley, Ascott Earl, Ascott-under-Wychwood, Ashbury, Asthall, Aston, Aston Rowant, Aston Tirrold¹, Aston Upthorpe

== B ==
Bainton, Baldon Row, Balscote, Bampton, Banbury, Barford St. John, Barford St. Michael, Barnard Gate, Barton, Baulking, Bayworth¹, Beckley, Begbroke, Benson, Berinsfield, Berrick Salome, Besselsleigh, Binsey, Bicester, Binfield Heath, Binsey, Bix and Assendon, Bix, Black Bourton, Blackthorn, Blackbird Leys, Bladon, Bletchingdon, Blewbury, Bloxham, Boars Hill¹, Bodicote, Botley¹, Bould, Bourton, Bow, Bretch Hill, Brighthampton, Brightwell Baldwin, Brightwell-cum-Sotwell¹, Britwell Salome, Brize Norton, Broadwell, Brookhampton, Broughton, Broughton Poggs, Bruern, Buckland, Bucknell, Burcot, Burdrop, Burford

== C ==
Caldecott¹, Calthorpe, Cane End, Carterton, Cassington, Caversfield, Chadlington, Chalgrove, Chalkhouse Green, Charlbury, Charlton-on-Otmoor, Charney Bassett, Chastleton, Chazey Heath, Childrey¹, Chilswell¹, Chilson, Chilton, Chimney, Chinnor, Chipping Norton, Chislehampton, Cholsey¹, Christmas Common, Churchill, Church Hanborough, Clanfield, Clattercote, Claydon, Clifton, Clifton Hampden, Cogges, Cold Harbour, Coleshill, Combe, Compton Beauchamp, Cornwell, Coscote, Cote, Cothill¹, Cottisford, Cowley, Crawley, Crays Pond, Cropredy, Crowmarsh Gifford, Crowsley, Cuddesdon, Culham, Cutteslowe, Cumnor¹, Cumnor Hill¹, Curbridge, Cuxham

== D ==
Dean, Dean Court¹, Deddington, Denchworth, Denton, Didcot¹, Dorchester-on-Thames, Draycott, Drayton near Banbury, Drayton near Abingdon¹, Drayton St. Leonard, Dry Sandford¹, Ducklington, Dunsden Green, Duns Tew, Duxford¹,

== E ==
Eaton¹, Easington, East Challow¹, East Ginge, East Hagbourne, East Hendred¹, East Hanney¹, East Hendred, East Lockinge¹, Eaton, Eaton Hastings¹, Elsfield, Emmington, Enslow, Enstone, Epwell, Ewelme, Exlade Street, Eynsham

== F ==
Faringdon¹, Farmoor¹, Fawler, Fawler, Vale of White Horse¹, Fencott, Fernham¹, Fewcott, Fifield, Filchampstead, Filkins, Finmere, Finstock, Forest Hill, Foscot, Foxcombe Hill¹, Freeland, Frilford¹, Fringford, Fritwell, Fulscot, Fulwell, Fyfield¹

== G ==
Gagingwell, Gainfield, Gallowstree Common, Garford¹, Garsington, Glympton, Godington, Godstow, Goosey¹, Goring Heath, Goring-on-Thames, Gosford, Grafton, Grandpont, Great Bourton, Great Coxwell¹, Great Haseley, Great Milton, Great Rollright, Great Tew, Grove¹,

== H ==
Hailey, Hampton Gay, Hampton Poyle, Hanney, Hanwell, Hardwick (West Oxfordshire), Hardwick (Cherwell), Harpsden, Harcourt Hill¹, Harwell¹, Hatford¹, Headington, Headington Hill, Hempton, Henley-on-Thames, Henton, Henwood¹, Hethe, Heythrop, Highmoor, Hinksey, Hinksey Hill, Hinton Waldrist¹, Holton, Holwell, Hook Norton, Horley, Hornton, Horspath, Horton-cum-Studley

== I ==
Idbury, Idstone, Iffley, Ipsden, Islip

== J ==
Jericho, Juniper Hill

== K ==
Kelmscott, Kencot, Kennington¹, Kiddington, Kidlington, Kidmore End, Kingham, Kingston Bagpuize¹, Kingston Blount, Kingston Lisle¹, Kirtlington

== L ==
Lamborough Hill¹, Langford, Langley, Launton, Leafield, Letcombe Bassett¹, Letcombe Regis¹, Lew, Little Baldon, Little Coxwell¹, Little Faringdon, Little Rollright, Little Tew, Littlemore, Littlestoke, Littleworth near Faringdon¹, Littleworth near Wheatley, Long Hanborough, Long Wittenham, Longworth¹ Lower Assendon, Lower Heyford, Lower Shiplake, Lollingdon¹, Longcot¹, Lyford¹, Lyneham,

== M ==
Maidensgrove, Mapledurham, Marcham¹, Marsh Baldon, Marston, Merton, Middle Assendon, Middle Aston, Middleton Stoney, Milcombe, Milton near Adderbury, Milton near Didcot¹, Milton-under-Wychwood, Minster Lovell, Mixbury, Mollington, Mongewell, Moreton, Moulsford, Murcott

== N ==
Neithrop, New Headington, New Hinksey, New Marston, Netherton, Nettlebed, Newington, Newnham Murren, Newton Purcell, Noke, North Hinksey¹, North Leigh, North Moreton, North Newington, North Oxford, North Stoke, Northend, Northmoor, Nuffield, Nuneham Courtenay

== O ==
Oakley, Oddington, Old Chalford, Old Headington, Old Marston, Over Kiddington, Over Norton, Osney, Oxford

== P ==
Piddington, Pishill, Play Hatch, Postcombe, Prescote, Preston Crowmarsh, Pusey¹, Pyrton.

== R ==
Radford, Radley¹, Ramsden, Roke, Rose Hill, Rotherfield Peppard Rousham, Russell's Water, Rycote

== S ==
St Ebbes, Salford, Sandford-on-Thames, Sandford St Martin, Sarsden, Seacourt, Shellingford¹, Shifford, Shillingford, Shelswell, Shilton, Shenington, Shifford, Shilton, Shiplake, Shippon¹, Shipton-on-Cherwell, Shipton-under-Wychwood, Shirburn, Shorthampton, Shrivenham¹, Shutford, Sibford Ferris, Sibford Gower, Signet, Somerton, Sonning Common, Sonning Eye, Souldern, South Hinksey¹, South Moreton, South Newington, South Stoke, South Weston, Southmoor Sparsholt¹, Spelsbury, Stadhampton, Standlake, Stanford End, Stanford in the Vale¹, Stanton Harcourt, Stanton St. John, Steeple Aston, Steeple Barton, Steventon¹, Stoke Lyne, Stoke Row, Stoke Talmage, Stonesfield, Stonor, Stratton Audley, Summertown, Sunningwell, Sutton Courtenay¹, Sutton Wick, Swalcliffe, Swerford, Swinbrook, Swinford¹ Sydenham

== T ==
Tackley, Taston, Tadmarton, Taynton, Temple Cowley, Tetsworth, Thame, Thrupp, Tiddington, Tokers Green, Toot Baldon, Towersey, Trench Green, Tusmore

== U ==
Uffington¹, Upper Arncott, Upper Heyford, Upperton, Upton near Didcot¹, Upton near Burford,

== W ==
Wallingford¹, Wantage¹, Warborough, Wardington, Watchfield¹, Water Eaton, Waterperry, Waterstock, Watlington, Weald, Wendlebury, West Challow¹, West Hagbourne, West Hanney¹, West Hendred¹, West Lockinge¹, Westcot, Westcott Barton, Weston-on-the-Green, Westwell, Wheatley, Whitchurch Hill, Whitchurch-on-Thames, Widford, Wigginton, Winterbrook, Wilcote, Witney, Wolvercote, Woodeaton, Woodcote, Woodstock, Woolstone¹, Wootton, Vale of White Horse¹, Wootton, West Oxfordshire, Worsham, Worton near Cassington, Wroxton, Wyfold, Wytham¹

== Y ==
Yarnton, Yelford

== See also ==
- List of places in England
- Category:Areas of Oxford
- Category:Towns in Oxfordshire
