= List of Berkshire boundary changes =

Boundary changes affecting the English county of Berkshire.

Date	Legislation	Effect
Historic county
20 October 1844	Counties (Detached Parts) Act 1844	Great Barrington (part) transferred to Gloucestershire; Little Faringdon transferred to Oxfordshire; Shilton (part) transferred to Oxfordshire; Oxenwood transferred to Wiltshire but erroneously listed as exclave, so transfer cancelled; Inglesham (part) transferred to Wiltshire; Hurst (part) transferred from Wiltshire; Shinfield (part) transferred from Wiltshire; Wokingham (part) transferred from Wiltshire
Administrative county
1889	Local Government Act 1888	Grandpont and New Hinksey transferred to Oxfordshire
1895	Local Government Act 1894	Combe transferred from Hampshire; Shalbourne (part) transferred to Wiltshire, including Oxenwood
9 November 1911	Local Government Board Provisional Order Confirmation (No. 11) Act 1911	Caversham transferred from Oxfordshire
Non-metropolitan county
1 April 1974	Local Government Act 1972	Abingdon, Didcot, Wallingford, Wantage and environs transferred to Oxfordshire (see list of places below); Burnham (part), (Note: The Britwell ward of Burnham parish was transferred to Berkshire to become the new parish of Britwell.) Datchet, Eton, Horton, Slough, Wexham (part) (Note: The part of the parish of Wexham transferred to Berkshire was formed into a new parish of Wexham Court.) and Wraysbury transferred from Buckinghamshire See list of places transferred.
1 April 1977		Mapledurham (part), Emmer Green (part), Caversham Park Village and Micklands Estate transferred from Oxfordshire
1 April 1990	The Berkshire, Dorset and Wiltshire (County Boundaries) Order 1989	Parts of Hungerford and Lambourne (50,112 hectares) exchanged with Wiltshire
1 April 1991	The Berkshire, Buckinghamshire, Hampshire, Oxfordshire and Surrey (County Boundaries) Order 1991	Exchanges with Oxfordshire (16 hectares); Exchanges with Buckinghamshire (32 hectares); Exchanges with Surrey (217 hectares); Exchanges with Hampshire (70 hectares)
1 April 1995	The Berkshire, Buckinghamshire and Surrey (County Boundaries) Order 1994	Colnbrook transferred from Buckinghamshire; Poyle transferred from Surrey

== List of places transferred from Berkshire to Oxfordshire in 1974 ==
- Abingdon
- Appleford-on-Thames
- Appleton
- Ardington
- Ardington Wick
- Ashbury
- Aston Tirrold
- Aston Upthorpe
- Bablock Hythe
- Badbury Hill
- Bagley Wood
- Baulking
- Bayworth
- Belmont
- Besselsleigh
- Blewbury
- Boars Hill
- Botley
- Bourton, Vale of White Horse
- Bow
- Brightwell-cum-Sotwell
- Buckland
- Caldecott
- Chain Hill
- Charney Bassett
- Childrey
- Chilswell
- Chilton
- Cholsey
- Compton Beauchamp
- Coscote
- Cothill
- Cumnor
- Cumnor Hill
- Cumnor Hurst
- Dean Court
- Denchworth
- Didcot
- Dragon Hill, Uffington
- Drayton, Vale of White Horse
- Dry Sandford
- Duxford
- East Hagbourne
- East Hanney
- East Hendred
- East Lockinge
- Eaton
- Eaton Hastings
- Faringdon
- Farmoor
- Fernham
- Frilford
- Fulscot
- Fyfield, Oxfordshire
- Gainfield
- Garford
- Great Coxwell
- Grove
- Harcourt Hill
- Harwell
- Hatford
- Hinksey
- Hinksey Hill
- Hinton Waldrist
- Kennington
- Kingston Bagpuize
- Kingston Bagpuize with Southmoor
- Kingston Lisle
- Letcombe Bassett
- Letcombe Regis
- Little Coxwell
- Little Wittenham
- Littleworth
- Lockinge
- Long Wittenham
- Longcot
- Longworth
- Lyford
- Marcham
- Moulsford
- North Hinksey
- Pusey
- Radley
- St. Helen Without
- Seacourt
- Shellingford
- Shippon
- Shrivenham
- Sotwell
- South Hinksey
- South Moreton
- Southmoor
- Stanford in the Vale
- Sunningwell
- Sutton Courtenay
- Swinford
- Tubney
- Uffington
- Upton
- Wallingford
- Wantage
- Watchfield
- West Hagbourne
- West Hanney
- West Hendred
- West Lockinge
- White Horse Hill
- Winterbrook
- Wittenham Clumps
- Woolstone
- Wootton, Vale of White Horse
- Wytham

== See also ==
- List of boundary changes in South East England
- History of Berkshire
