= Swinford (disambiguation) =

Swinford is a town in County Mayo, Ireland.

Swinford may also refer to:

Places

- Swinford, Leicestershire, England, a village
- Swinford, Oxfordshire, England, a hamlet

- location of Swinford Toll Bridge

- Swinford Glacier, Antarctica
- Mount Swinford, Antarctica

People

- Swinford (surname)

Other

- Swinford Bandog, a dog breeding program

== See also ==
- Old Swinford
- Kingswinford
