= Henwood, Oxfordshire =

Hamlet in Oxfordshire, England

Coordinates: 51°43′N 1°19′W

Henwood
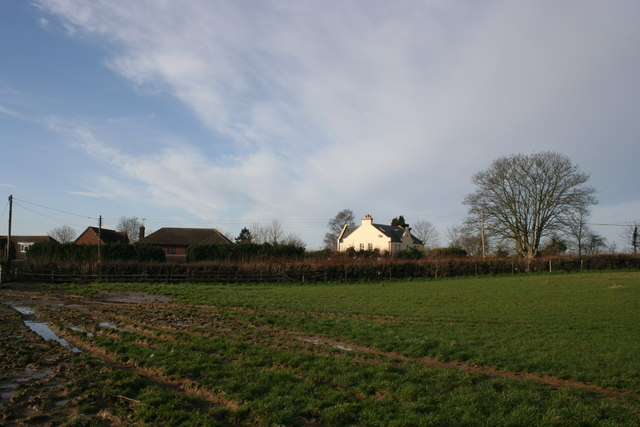
- Cheney Lea

- Location within Oxfordshire
- Civil parish: Cumnor
- District: Vale of White Horse
- Shire county: Oxfordshire
- Region: South East
- Country: England
- Sovereign state: United Kingdom
- Police: Thames Valley
- Fire: Oxfordshire
- Ambulance: South Central

Henwood is a hamlet in the civil parish of Cumnor, in the Vale of White Horse district, in Oxfordshire, England, about 3.5 miles (5.6 km) south-west of Oxford.

Historically, Henwood was a single farm in the parish of Cumnor. Since then, there has been ribbon development along the B4017 road. Henwood was in Berkshire until the 1974 boundary changes transferred it to Oxfordshire.

Henwood Farmhouse dates back to the 17th century. It is a Grade II Listed Building.
