= Chain Hill =

Hill in Wantage, Oxfordshire, England

Coordinates: 51°34′58″N 1°25′8″W

The Chain Hill scarp south of Wantage

Chain Hill is one of the hills of the Berkshire Downs, located in the civil parish of Wantage in the English county of Oxfordshire. In 1974 it was transferred from Berkshire. It is designated part of the North Wessex Downs Area of Outstanding Natural Beauty by the Countryside Agency and forms part of the Vale of White Horse.

Chain Hill is the chalk downland hill directly above Wantage and also the name of the road rising from Wantage through the westerly part of the scarp to the Berkshire Downs. It rises steeply south of Wantage towards Wantage Field and back to the Ridgeway and east from Manor Road across to Lark Hill. Chain Hill is also known as the B4494 and is signposted to Newbury.

At the crest of the hill, there is a small community amid copses of beech, fir and chestnut and a reservoir which taps into the chalk water beds and supplies water to Wantage. Apart from this, most of Chain Hill is wide undulating crop plains made up of large fields descending from the ridgeway. At the bottom slopes of Chain Hill is a cemetery and then at the bottom of this, is Ormond Road and former St Mary's School.

== Panorama ==
A view of Wantage from Chain Hill ,

Along the length of Chain Hill there are elevated 360-degree panoramic views over Wantage, to the Cotswolds, Faringdon Folly, Badbury Hill and the Oxfordshire plains. To the south and west, Chain Hill is encircled by the Wessex hillforts of White Horse Hill, Ram's Hill and Segsbury Camp together with the natural Ridgeway features around the Hackpen Hill. To the east of the Chain Hill scarp there are sunrise views of over 40 miles to Ivinghoe Beacon over Flagstaff Hill, Goldbury Hill, Wittenham Clumps, Brightwell Barrow, the Sinodun Hills and the chalk crosses carved in the Chiltern Hills escarpment at Bledlow and Princes Risborough.

The Chain Hill scarp appears on British Library map called Wantage and can be seen to be the closest panoramic viewpoint of both Wantage centre, the Thames Valley basin and the hill forts and beacons around.

== History ==
The plains of Chain Hill were held by the King as part of the Royal Estate in Wantage as referred to by Asser in the opening paragraph of the Life of King Alfred and as also recorded in the Domesday Book. According to the Vale and Downland Museum, the current name most likely is a derivative of the French word, 'Chêne', meaning Oak named by a French speaking settler over the years. It may have been named in Norman times or possibly much earlier by the daughter of Charles the Bald, king of the West Franks; Princess Judith (Leotheta). If so, it would probably have been during a stay at Ælfred's birthplace in Wantage after Æthelwulf's pilgrimage to Rome and return via France with his new bride in 856. Over the years the name became 'Chayne Hill' and then finally the 'y' became an 'i' and the 'e' was dropped, and so the current name, Chain Hill, came into common use.

In the mid-19th century, Chain Hill was bought by Edward Ormond; the solicitor and benefactor of Wantage Memorial Park. Prior to being named Ormond Road, the road at the foot of Chain Hill was known as Pidgeon Lane and prior to that, the Icknield Way, one of the oldest roads in Britain. On the T-junction of Chain Hill and what was the Icknield Way, there is a Norman arch leading through the wall to the historic site thought to be used for the meeting of the Witan circa 995. Latterly the site was used by the convent of the Community of St Mary the Virgin as St Mary's School, Wantage.

== Archaeology ==
A number of coin and sceat finds have been made at the top of Chain Hill indicating a period of settlement from the late Iron Age through to Medieval times. Of particular note was an Æthelwulf of Wessex coin, Doribi/Cant issued between AD848-851 by the Rochester mint and moneyed by Manic. The find was listed by the Portable Antiquities Scheme as of regional importance because Æthelwulf was Ælfred's father and Ælfred was born in Wantage during the period in which this coin was minted. The detailed record can be found here

== Literature ==
It is quite possible to imagine, whilst sitting atop Chain Hill on a sunny day, pictures of Judith reading Beowulf to young Ælfred under the shade of an oak. With the hills of historic Wessex behind him and the plains of Mercia in front of him, it is not surprising to see G. K. Chesterton comment on how important the place would have been to him in the book London.

"There is a story (one among many) that there was a settlement before the Romans came, which occupied about the same space that is now occupied by Cannon Street Station. In any case, it is probable that the seed of the city was sown somewhere about that slope of the riverside. The Romans made it a great town but hardly their greatest town, and the barbarism of the ninth century left it bare. Its second or third foundation as a predominant city belongs, like many such things, to the genius and tenacity of Alfred. He did not indeed hold it as a capital of England, but rather as an outpost of Wessex. From his point of view, London was a suburb of Wantage. But he saw the practical importance of its position towards the river mouth; and he held it tight."

== Nature ==
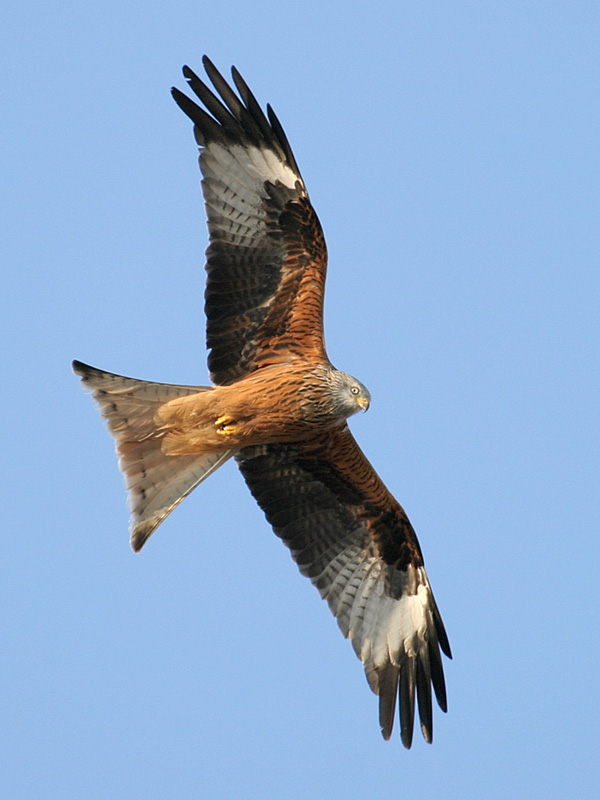
A red kite, one of the animals that inhabit Chain hill

Like many parts of the Southern England Chalk Formation, the natural chalk and downland countryside around Chain Hill provides a habitat for many types of butterflies and wildflowers including cowslip, orchids, thistles and daisy. The mixed farmland on the hills around supports a wide variety of birdlife including yellowhammer, corn bunting, common linnet, northern wheatear, whinchat, yellow wagtail, lapwing, red kite, sparrowhawk, barn owl, pheasant, grey partridge, stock dove and skylark. Roe deer, Reeve's muntjac and red fox are regular visitors and have been sighted all along the hill in their natural habitat.

== Events ==
The Old Berks Point to Point holds one meeting each year on Easter Monday further up Chain Hill en route to West Lockinge. The point to point racing is organised by about 125 local volunteers and attracts between eight and ten thousand spectators making it one of the largest horse racing events in the area during the year.

Chain Hill Panorama

Devil's Punchbowl

White Horse Hill

Wantage

Faringdon Heights

Wittenham Clumps

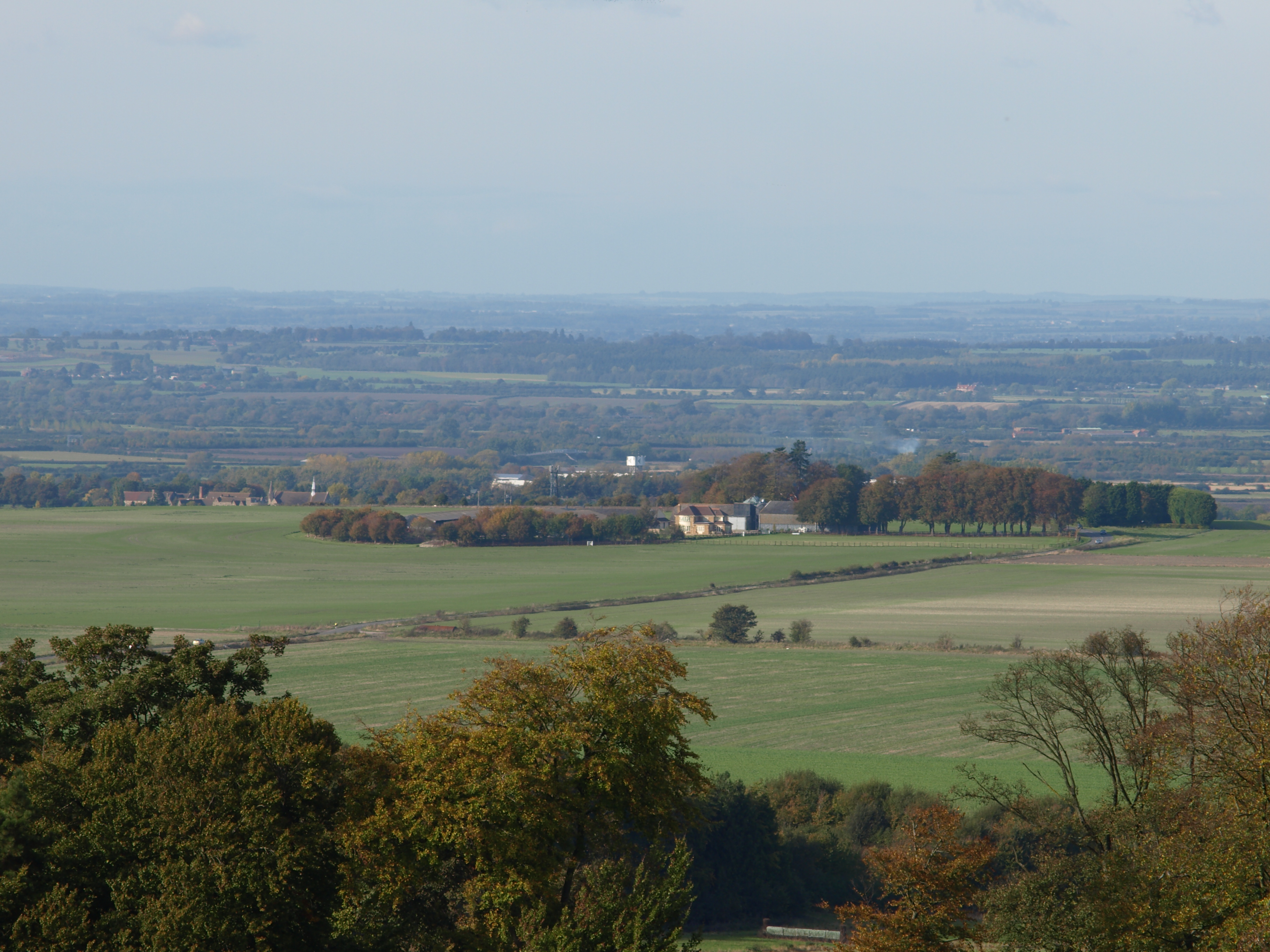
Wantage Field
