= History of Berkshire =

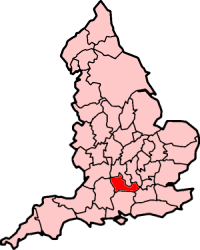
Ancient extent of Berkshire

Historically, the English county of Berkshire has been bordered to the north by the ancient boundary of the River Thames. However, there were major changes in 1974: the Vale of White Horse and parts of Oxfordshire south (locally, west) of the Thames were previously part of Berkshire, but were lost to the county in 1974. Conversely, the Slough area north of the Thames is historically part of Buckinghamshire, but became ceremonially part of Berkshire in 1974.

Alfred the Great was born in Wantage, historically in Berkshire, but now in Oxfordshire for administrative purposes. Important historical abbeys include Abingdon Abbey and Reading Abbey.

The Great Western Railway reached Didcot in 1839. MG (part of Morris Motors) was founded in Abingdon in 1929.

Oscar Wilde was imprisoned in Reading Gaol after his court case.

The county is known as the Royal County of Berkshire. This title was granted by Queen Elizabeth II to Berkshire County Council in 1957, via Sir Austin Strutt, Deputy Under-Secretary of State, who wrote to E.R. Davies, clerk to the county council, conveying the Queen's permission for the use of the term. Administratively, the county is now made up of unitary authorities.

== History ==
Members of the Atrebates tribe lived in a region stretching between the Thames, the Test, and West Sussex in pre-Roman times.

During the heptarchy, the area formed part of the kingdom of Wessex, and relics of Saxon occupation have been discovered in various parts of the county. Of these the most remarkable are the burial grounds at Long Wittenham and Frilford, and there is evidence that the Lambourn valley was occupied in early Saxon times. The cinerary urns found in Berkshire undoubtedly contain the ashes of the Anglians who came south under Penda in the 7th century. The fortification called Cherbury Castle, not far from Denchworth, is said to have been first made up by King Canute.

At the time of the Norman Conquest, Berkshire formed part of the Earldom of Harold, and supported him staunchly at the Battle of Hastings. This loyalty was punished by very sweeping confiscations, and at the time of the Domesday survey no estates of any importance were in the hands of Englishmen. When Alfred the Great divided the country into shires, this county received the name of Berrocscir, as Asser says, "from the wood of Berroc, where the box-tree grows most plentifully". At the time of the survey it comprised twenty-two hundreds; in 1911 there were only twenty, of which eleven retained their ancient names.

Over the centuries, many parishes were transferred from one hundred to another, but until the late 20th century the boundary of the county remained practically unchanged. Parts of the parishes of Shilton and Langford formed exclaves of the shire, until they were transferred to Oxfordshire in the reign of William IV. Portions of Coombe and Shalbourne parishes were also restored to Hampshire and Wiltshire respectively, while the Wiltshire portion of Hungerford was transferred to Berkshire. The county was originally included in the see of Winchester, but in AD 909 it was removed to the newly-formed see of "Wiltshire", afterwards united with Sherborne.

In 1075 the seat of the bishopric was removed to Salisbury, and in 1836 by an order in council Berkshire was transferred to the diocese of Oxford. The archdeaconry is of very early origin and is co-extensive with the county. Formerly it comprised four rural deaneries, but the number has lately been increased to nine. Much of the early history of the county is recorded in the Chronicles of Abingdon Abbey, which at the time of the survey was second only to the crown in the extent and number of its possessions, such as The Abbey, Sutton Courtenay. The abbot also exercised considerable judicial and administrative powers, and his court was endowed with the privileges of the hundred court and was freed from liability to interference by the sheriff. Berkshire and Oxfordshire had a common sheriff until the reign of Elizabeth I, and the shire court was held at Grauntpont. The assizes were formerly held at Reading, Abingdon and Newbury, but by 1911 were held entirely at Reading.

=== County estates ===
At the time of the Domesday survey the chief lay-proprietor was Henry de Ferrers, ancestor of the earls of Derby, but it is remarkable that none of the great Berkshire estates has remained with the same family for long. Thomas Fuller quaintly observes that "the lands of Berkshire are very skittish and apt to cast their owners". The De la Poles succeeded to large estates by a marriage with the heiress of Thomas Chaucer, son of the poet, but the family became extinct in the male line, and the estates were alienated. The same fate befell the estates of the Achards, the Fitzwarrens and later the families of Norris and Befils.

== Economic history ==
The natural advantages of this county have always encouraged agricultural rather than commercial pursuits. The soil is especially adapted for sheep-farming, and numerous documents testify to the importance and prosperity of the wool-trade in the 12th century. At first this trade was confined to the export of the raw material, but the reign of Edward III saw the introduction of the clothing industry, for which the county afterwards became famous. For more detail, see Jack O'Newbury. This trade began to decline in the 17th century, and in 1641 the Berkshire clothiers complained of the deadness of their trade and the difficulty of getting ready money, attributing this to delay in the execution of justice. The malting industry and the timber trade also flourished in the county until the 19th century. Agriculturally considered, the Vale of the White Horse is especially productive, and Camden speaks of the great crops of barley grown in the district.

== Armed conflicts ==
Perhaps owing to its proximity to London, Berkshire has from early times been the scene of frequent military operations. The earliest recorded historical fact relating to the county is the occupation of the district between Wallingford and Ashbury by Offa in 758. In the 9th and 10th centuries the county was greatly impoverished by the ravages of the Danes, and in 871 the invaders were defeated by Æthelwulf at Englefield and again at Reading. During The Anarchy of Stephen's reign Wallingford was garrisoned for Matilda and was the scene of the final treaty in 1153. There were meetings between King John and his barons in 1213 at Wallingford and at Reading, and in 1216 Windsor was besieged by the barons.

At the opening of the English Civil War in the 17th century, the sheriff, on behalf of the inhabitants of Berkshire, petitioned that the county might be put in a posture of defence, and here the royalists had some of their strongest garrisons. Reading endured a ten days' siege by the parliamentary forces in 1643, and Wallingford did not surrender until 1646. Newbury was the site of two battles, the first in 1643 and the second in 1644.

== Parliamentary representation ==
In 1295, Berkshire returned two Knights of the Shire to parliament for the county and two for the borough of Reading. Later the boroughs of Newbury, Wallingford, Windsor and Abingdon secured representation, and from 1557 until the Reform Act 1832 the county was represented by a total of ten members. By that Act Abingdon and Wallingford were each deprived of a member, but the county returned three members instead of two. From the Redistribution of Seats Act 1885 into the 20th century the county returned three members for three divisions, and Windsor and Reading returned one member each, the remaining boroughs having lost representation.

== See also ==
- List of places transferred from Berkshire to Oxfordshire in 1974
- List of places transferred from Buckinghamshire to Berkshire in 1974
- List of lost settlements in the United Kingdom § Berkshire
