= Monica Bridges =

Pianist and composer, wife of Robert Bridges (1863–1949)

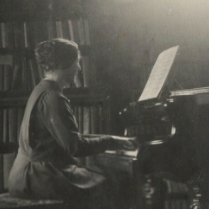
- Born: Mary Monica Waterhouse; 31 August 1863; Victoria Park, Manchester, England
- Died: 9 November 1949 (aged 86); South London
- Occupation(s): Pianist, composer
- Spouse: Robert Bridges
- Children: Margaret; Elizabeth Daryush; Edward Bridges

(Mary) Monica Bridges born Mary Monica Waterhouse (pseud) Matthew Barnes (31 August 1863 – 9 November 1949) was a British pianist, composer and collaborator with her husband the poet Robert Bridges. She made italic handwriting popular in British schools.

== Life ==
Bridges was born in Victoria Park, Manchester, in 1863 and brought up in the grand house of Foxhill House near Reading which her parents lived in until 1881. Her mother, Elizabeth (born Hodgkin), taught her arts and crafts and she became a pianist and a composer. Her father, Alfred Waterhouse, was a prolific and very successful architect.

She met her future husband when she was in her mid teens. They were artistic collaborators and they married in 1884.

In 1903 she and her daughter, Margaret, both got tuberculosis.

In 1905 her book (by M. M. Bridges), A New Handwriting for Teachers was published. She was a skilled calligrapher and this book is credited with making italic handwriting fashionable in British schools.

In 1907 using money left to them by her father they built a home in Chilswell.

In 1913 the Society for Pure English was formed with her husband getting the credit. Monica and her husband both served on the committee and they would jointly publish tracts under the shared pseudonym of Matthew Barnes. Other members included H. Bradley, Sir W. Raleigh and L. P. Smith. The society aimed to have clarity in communication and they wrote about issues relating to the derivation of words and their usage.

== Deaths and legacy ==
Her husband died in 1930 and Bridges died in South London in 1949. Her (and her husband's) correspondence is held in the Bodleian Library.
