= Dean Court, Oxfordshire =

Hamlet in Oxfordshire, England

Coordinates: 51.749°N 1.310°W

Dean Court
- Location within Oxfordshire
- OS grid reference: SP4705
- Civil parish: Cumnor
- District: Vale of White Horse
- Shire county: Oxfordshire
- Region: South East
- Country: England
- Sovereign state: United Kingdom
- Post town: Oxford
- Postcode district: OX2
- Dialling code: 01865
- Police: Thames Valley
- Fire: Oxfordshire
- Ambulance: South Central
- UK Parliament: Oxford West and Abingdon

Dean Court is a hamlet 2 miles (3.2 km) west of the centre of Oxford, England. Dean Court was part of Berkshire until the 1974 local government boundary changes transferred it to Oxfordshire.

== History ==
The area was the site of a medieval grange of Abingdon Abbey, excavated in the 1970s and 1980s. Dean Court was first mentioned in the 14th century under the name of "La Dene". The name reflects its location between Wytham Hill and Cumnor Hill: the Old English denu is a word used for long narrow valleys with moderately steep gradients on either side. In 1538 there was a reference to "the rectory of Dencourt". However there is no later record of the church which was evidently in the hamlet during the Middle Ages.

A map of 1761 shows Dean Court as a small hamlet on the road from Oxford to Eynsham, and so it remained until after the Second World War.

Development of the area started in the early 1950s with a housing estate called Pinnocks Way. In 1969 Deanfield Road, Broad Close and Owlington Close were built north of Eynsham Road by Wimpey Homes. The Orchard Road estate (originally marketed as "The Hawthornes") was built by Broseley Estates Limited and Costain in 1983 and later in 1985 houses were added by Thameway and Macleans. The Fogwell Road estate was built in 1986.

Dean Court is part of the parish of Cumnor, and until the 20th century parishioners worshipped 1.5 miles (2.4 km) away at the Church of England parish church of Saint Michael, Cumnor. There is now the church of Saint Andrew, Dean Court that was built as a chapel of ease.
