= Filchampstead =

Hamlet in Oxfordshire, England

Coordinates: 51°44′55″N 1°20′42″W

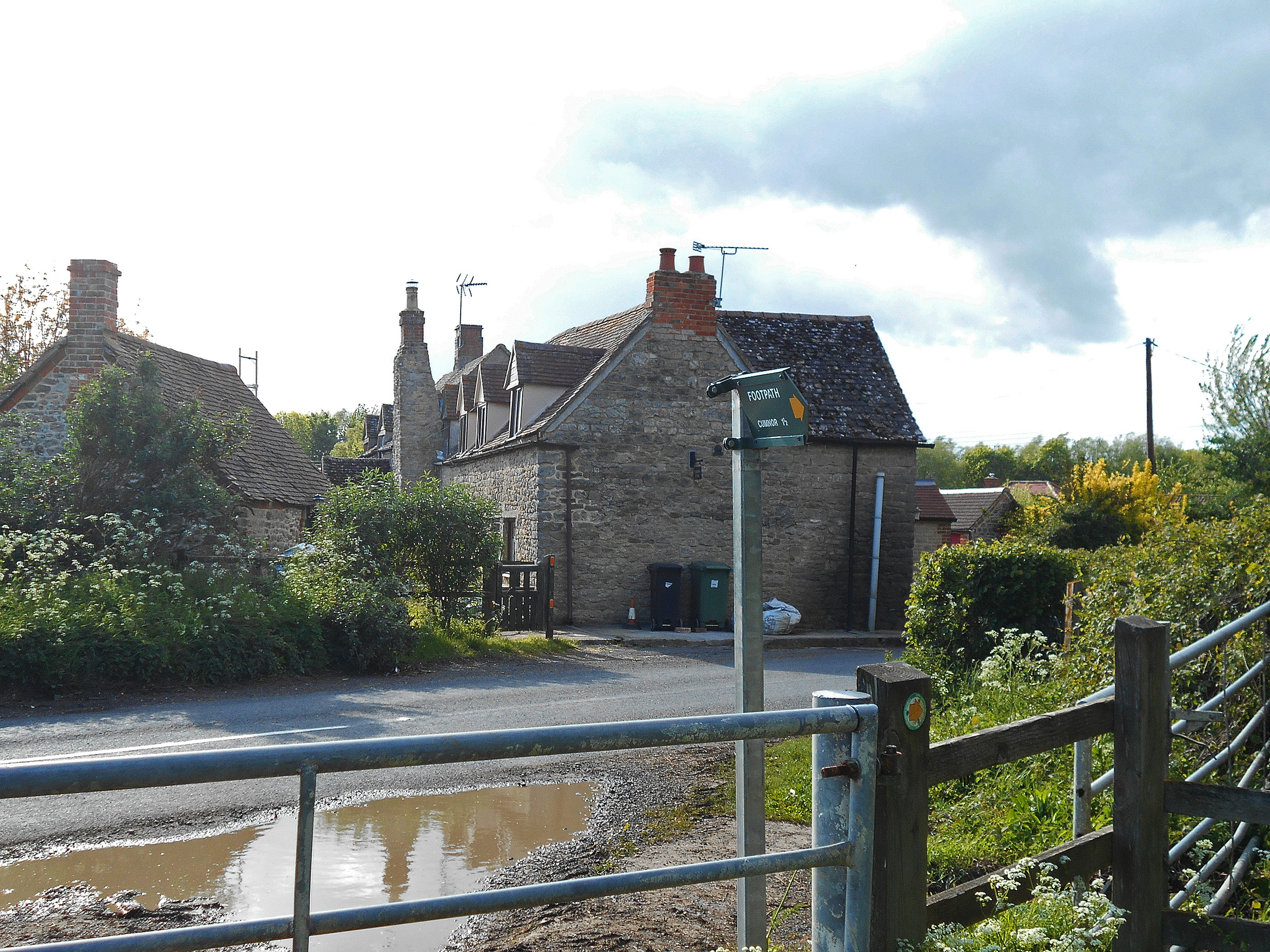
Cottages at Filchamstead

Filchampstead is a hamlet within Cumnor Parish, Oxfordshire. Until the 1974 boundary changes it was in Berkshire. It lies on the Cumnor Road (B4017) between Farmoor and Cumnor village, at the foot of a hill known locally as 'Tumbledown Dick'.

Filchampstead lies alongside Farmoor Reservoir and the Oxford Green Belt Way public footpath.
