= Chilswell =

Hamlet in Oxfordshire, England

Coordinates: 51°43′34″N 1°17′7″W

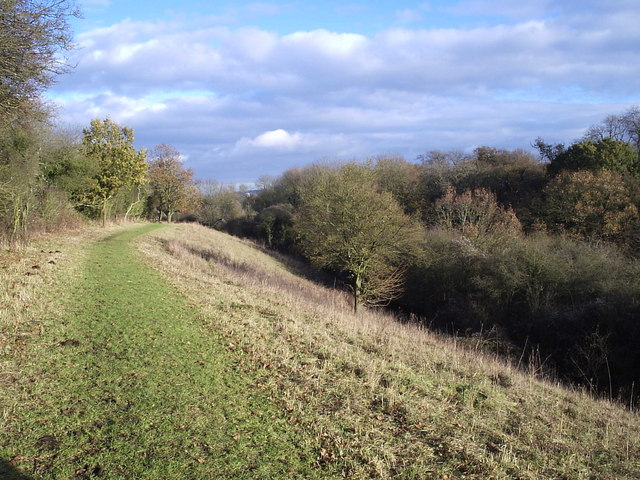
Chilswell Valley

Chilswell is a small settlement in the parish of Cumnor, Oxfordshire. It lies between the village of South Hinksey and Boars Hill. In 1974, it was transferred from Berkshire.

Although very small in size, the hamlet is known for its picturesque rural setting and its cultural significance. An older form of the name is Childsworth, and the place is mentioned by that name in the poem Thyrsis by Matthew Arnold. Arnold's "signal elm" is in a field nearby, bought by the Oxford Preservation Trust from All Souls College, Oxford in 2009.

Chilswell's elevation on Boars Hill provides scenic vistas: looking north from the area, one can see the skyline of Oxford. The phrase "that sweet city with her dreaming spires," often used to describe Oxford, also comes from Arnold's evocative description in Thyrsis, inspired by the view from the Chilswell/Boars Hill area.

The remains of a Roman villa have been found nearby.

The place was first mentioned in 1180 as Chiefleswelle. The name is of Old English origin, and appears to mean 'the stream of a man called Cifel'.

In addition to Arnold's indirect association, Chilswell had a direct link to literary life in the early 20th century through Robert Bridges the writer Monica Bridges. Robert Bridges, a poet who served as UK Poet Laureate from 1913 to 1930, and his family with three children chose Chilswell as their home. He commissioned the building of Chilswell House in 1907 and lived there for many years.

Chilswell Valley — also known as Happy Valley — between Chilswell and South Hinksey, is a nature reserve managed by Oxford City Council. A stream lined with reedbeds flows through this valley and old oak and ash trees grow in the area. The limestone grassland is home to rare orchids, wild liquorice, and wildflowers. A boardwalk allows hikers to explore the reedbed and fen. Sparrowhawks and buzzards are often seen overhead.
