= Swinford Toll Bridge =

Bridge in Eynsham, Oxfordshire, England

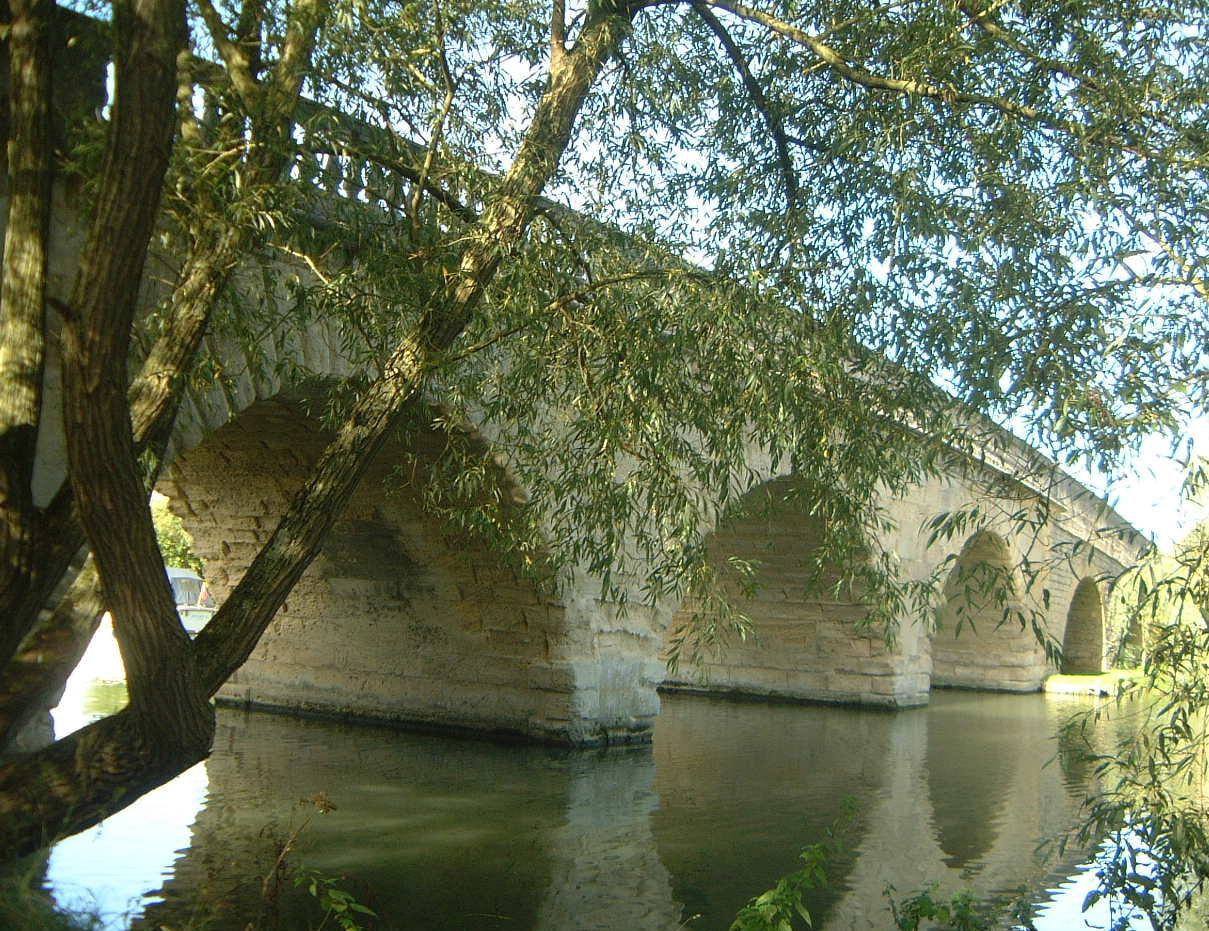
- Coordinates: 51.7746°N 1.3596°W
- Carries: B4044 road
- Crosses: River Thames
- Locale: Eynsham, Oxfordshire

Characteristics
- Material: Stone
- Height: 14 feet 9 inches (4.50 m)

History
- Opened: 1769

Statistics
- Toll: Free for Motorcycles; £0.05 Cars and Vans; £0.10 Vehicles towing trailers; £0.12 Single Deck Buses; £0.20 Double Deck Buses; £0.10 per axle Goods Vehicles

Listed Building – Grade II*
- Official name: Swinford Bridge (that part in Cumnor)
- Designated: 9 February 1966
- Reference no.: 1284764

Scheduled monument
- Official name: Swinford Bridge
- Reference no.: 1006292

Location
- Interactive map of Swinford Toll Bridge

Swinford Toll Bridge is a privately owned toll bridge across the Thames in Oxfordshire, England. It crosses the river just above Eynsham Lock, between the village of Eynsham on the north-west bank and the hamlet of Swinford on the south-east bank (in Berkshire until 1974). It carries the B4044 between Oxford and Eynsham, which was the A40 road until the north Oxford bypass was completed in 1936.

It is a Grade II* listed building, and has been listed as a scheduled monument.

== History ==
Swinford Bridge Act 1766
- Act of Parliament
- Parliament of Great Britain
- Long title: An Act for building a Bridge cross the River Thames, from Swynford in the County of Berks, to Eynsham in the County of Oxford.
- Citation: 7 Geo. 3. c. 63
- Territorial extent: Great Britain

Dates
- Royal assent: 27 February 1767
- Commencement: 11 November 1766 (Note: Start of session.)

Status: Current legislation

Text of statute as originally enacted

Swinford Bridge is an archetypal Georgian bridge built of local limestone which opened in 1769. It replaced a ferry and its construction was funded by the then Earl of Abingdon. The toll rights and concomitant duty to maintain are by an act of Parliament, the Swinford Bridge Act 1766 (7 Geo. 3. c. 63). It also made the building of bridges across the river illegal for 3 miles (4.8 km) up or down stream. The bridge was completed two years later.

If annual tolls outweigh annual maintenance the owners do not pay tax on that net income. This is a rare perquisite agreed by Parliament, rewarding the work of collecting the tolls in all financial circumstances. It provides for a similar tax-free status of formal local authorities, on their surpluses, if any. It is one of the two remaining toll bridges that cross the Thames, the other being Whitchurch Bridge.

Since 1835, tolls for pedestrians have been abolished. Cycles and motorcycles are also exempt from tolls. Other classes of traffic remain subject to tolls. The tariff starts at 5p in the case of cars (without other vehicle or trailer under tow). Campaigns have been occasional to make the bridge toll-free. Oxfordshire County Council estimates that 10,000 motor vehicles cross the bridge each day. Toll collection causes delays in the peak times of day. CCTV enables enforcement against evasion. An online poll in 2006 on the Witney Gazette website showed that 87.5% of voters wanted the tolls scrapped.

The bridge was put up for sale in 2009 and was sold at auction on 3 December for £1.08 million. A campaign calling for Oxfordshire County Council to buy the bridge was unsuccessful.

== See also ==
- Crossings of the River Thames
- List of toll bridges in the United Kingdom

== Bibliography ==
- Baggs, AP; Blair, WJ; Chance, Eleanor; Colvin, Christina; Cooper, Janet; Day, CJ; Selwyn, Nesta; Townley, Simon C (1990). "Eynsham: Introduction". In Crossley, Alan; Elrington, CR (eds.). A History of the County of Oxford. Victoria County History. Vol. 12: Wootton Hundred (South) including Woodstock. London: Oxford University Press for the Institute of Historical Research. pp. 98–110. ISBN 978-0-19722-774-9.
- Jervoise, Edwyn (1930). The Ancient Bridges of the South of England. Vol. I. Westminster: The Architectural Press for the SPAB.
- Thacker, Fred S (1968) [1920]. The Thames Highway. Vol. II: Locks and Weirs. Newton Abbott: David & Charles. SBN 7153-4233-9.
- de Villiers, E (1969). Swinford Toll Bridge 1769–1969. Eynsham: Eynsham History Group.

Next crossing upstream	River Thames	Next crossing downstream
Pinkhill Lock (pedestrian)	Swinford Toll Bridge	A34 Road Bridge (road)
