= Shalbourne =

Village in Wiltshire, England

Coordinates: 51.368°N 1.550°W

- St. Michael and All Angels

- Location within Wiltshire
- Population: 558 (in 2011)
- OS grid reference: SU3163
- Unitary authority: Wiltshire
- Ceremonial county: Wiltshire
- Region: South West
- Country: England
- Sovereign state: United Kingdom
- Post town: Marlborough
- Postcode district: SN8
- Post town: Hungerford
- Postcode district: RG17
- Dialling code: 01672
- Police: Wiltshire
- Fire: Dorset and Wiltshire
- Ambulance: South Western
- UK Parliament: East Wiltshire
- Website: www.shalbourne.org

Shalbourne is a village and civil parish in the English county of Wiltshire, about 3 miles (4.8 km) southwest of Hungerford, Berkshire. The parish has a number of widely spaced small settlements including Bagshot and Stype, to the north, and Rivar and Oxenwood to the south. Before 1895, about half of the parish of Shalbourne (including its church) lay in Berkshire.

== History ==
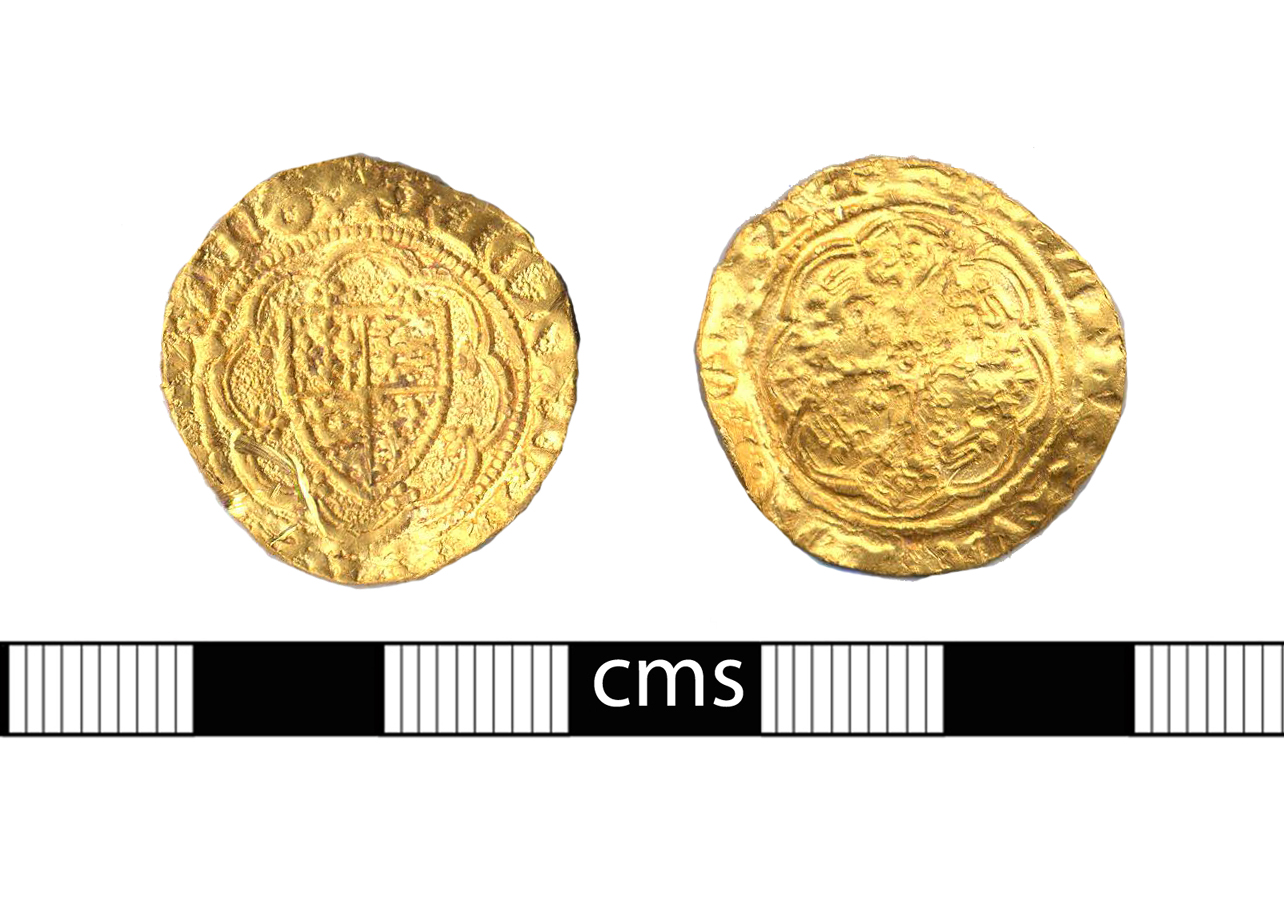
A gold quarter noble coin of Richard II, minted 1377–1399 and found in Shalbourne in 2016

Domesday Book of 1086 recorded a settlement of 48 households at Saldeborne or Scaldeburne.

Under the Counties (Detached Parts) Act 1844, Oxenwood tithing was transferred from Berkshire to Wiltshire. Bagshot tithing was transferred in 1895, to complete the consolidation of the parish within Wiltshire.

== Parish church ==
The Anglican Church of St Michael and All Angels is Grade II* listed. Built in flint and stone with tiled roofs, it dates from the 12th or 13th century and was partly rebuilt and extended by G.F. Bodley in 1873.

The nave is either 12th century or a 13th-century rebuilding; reconstruction of the south aisle in the 19th century reused two 12th-century doorways. The chancel was rebuilt around 1300, and the tower added in the 15th century.

Three of the six bells in the tower are from the 17th century. The east chancel window has 1871 stained glass by Kempe. A window by Henry Haig was added in 1995, from designs of Karl Parsons, who lived at Shalbourne from 1930 until the onset of ill health in 1933.

The benefice was united with that of Ham with Buttermere in 1956. Today the parish is part of the Savernake Team, a group of eleven village parishes.

== Other buildings ==
Also Grade II* listed are West Court farmhouse (15th and 17th centuries) and Shalbourne Manor farmhouse (16th century).

== Geography ==
The stream known as the Shalbourne flows northeast from its spring-fed source near Shalbourne village, to join the River Dun above Hungerford.

== Local government ==
The civil parish elects a parish council. It is in the area of Wiltshire Council, a unitary authority, which is responsible for all significant local government functions.

== Amenities ==
Shalbourne has a primary school, and a village hall which was built in 1843 as a schoolroom. It has a cricket pitch and pavilion with a bar. At the centre of the village, near the village green, are the pub (The Plough) and a small post office and shop which sells a variety of products and refreshments. The shop stocks organic vegetables from Shalbourne's community project, a small allotment that sells vegetable boxes to the village and surroundings.

== Notable people ==
- Alexander Chocke of Shalbourne (1594–1625) was elected to Parliament for Ludgershall in 1621.
- From 1608 until late 1637, tenants of the parish's Westcourt Manor included William Carpenter and his namesake son, both of whom emigrated to Weymouth, Massachusetts in 1638 on the Bevis from Southampton. The younger William was a founder of Rehoboth, Massachusetts. The Rehoboth Carpenter family's descendants number in the tens of thousands, among whom are two U.S. presidents and a Project Mercury astronaut. William Carpenter [Jr.] married at Shalbourne in 1625 Abigail Briant, whose family had resided in the parish since at least the late 16th century.
- Jethro Tull (1674–1741), agricultural pioneer, from 1709 owned Prosperous farm, close to the northeast boundary of the present parish.
- Marguerite de Beaumont (1899–1989), founding member of Girl Guides, biographer of Lord Baden-Powell, and recipient of the Silver Fish Award, Girl Guiding's highest adult honour.

== See also ==
- Botley Down, a biological Site of Special Scientific Interest near Oxenwood
