= Swinford (surname) =

Swinford is a surname. Notable people with the name include:

- David Swinford (1941–2022), American politician
- Elaine Swinford, American politician
- Emerson Swinford, Los Angeles-based guitarist, composer/songwriter and producer.
- Mac Swinford (1899–1975), United States federal judge
- Thomas Swinford (1839–1915), English cricketer
