= Eaton, Oxfordshire =

Hamlet in Oxfordshire, England

Coordinates: 51.727°N 1.356°W

Eaton
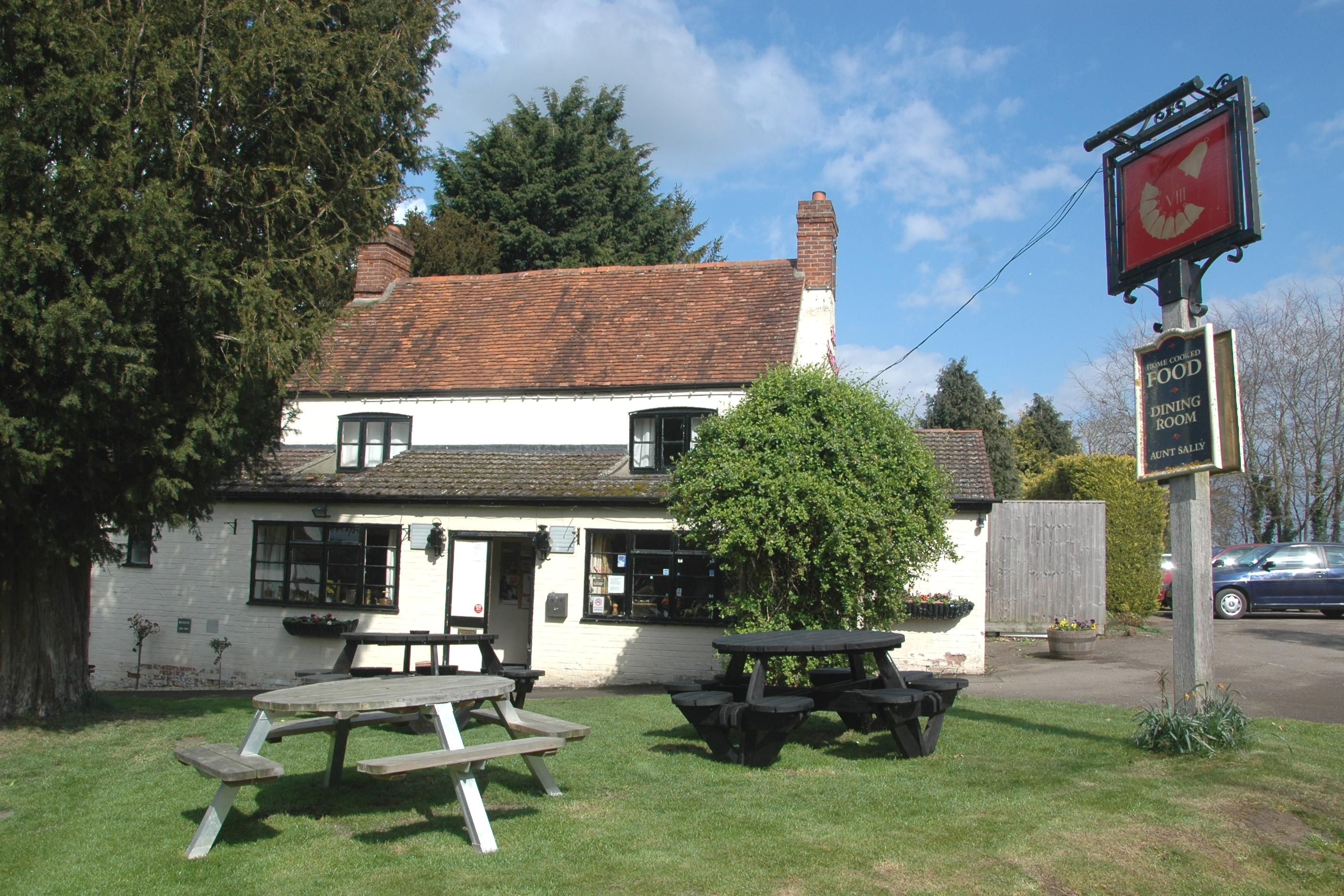
- The Eight Bells public house

- Location within Oxfordshire
- OS grid reference: SP4403
- Civil parish: Appleton-with-Eaton
- District: Vale of White Horse
- Shire county: Oxfordshire
- Region: South East
- Country: England
- Sovereign state: United Kingdom
- Post town: Abingdon
- Postcode district: OX13
- Dialling code: 01865
- Police: Thames Valley
- Fire: Oxfordshire
- Ambulance: South Central
- UK Parliament: Oxford West and Abingdon
- Website: Appleton with Eaton Parish

Eaton is a hamlet about 4 1/2 miles (7 km) west of Oxford and about 5 miles (8 km) northwest of Abingdon. Eaton is in the civil parish of Appleton-with-Eaton, which was part of Berkshire until the 1974 boundary changes transferred it to Oxfordshire.

== History ==
Eaton is on a single-track road leading to the River Thames at Bablock Hythe, where there was an important vehicular ferry across the river. The village is built on land belonging to St John's College, Oxford. St John's College, Oxford had the Manor House built in 1677 as a refuge from the Plague for dons. It is now a farmhouse and what had been five farms have been merged into two: Manor Farm and West Farm.

== Amenities and public transport ==
Eaton has a public house, The Eight Bells, which has a darts team and an Aunt Sally team. A ghost called Libby is reputed to haunt the pub.

Oxfordshire County Council subsidised bus route 63 between Oxford and Southmoor serves Eaton five times a day in each direction from Monday to Friday. There is no service on Saturday, Sunday, or Bank Holidays. The current contractor operating the route is Thames Travel.

== Sources ==
- Ditchfield, PH; Page, William, eds. (1924). A History of the County of Berkshire. Victoria County History. Vol. IV. assisted by John Hautenville Cope. London: The St Katherine Press. pp. 335–341.
