= Badbury Hill =

Hill in Oxfordshire

Coordinates: 51.65049°N 1.62271°W

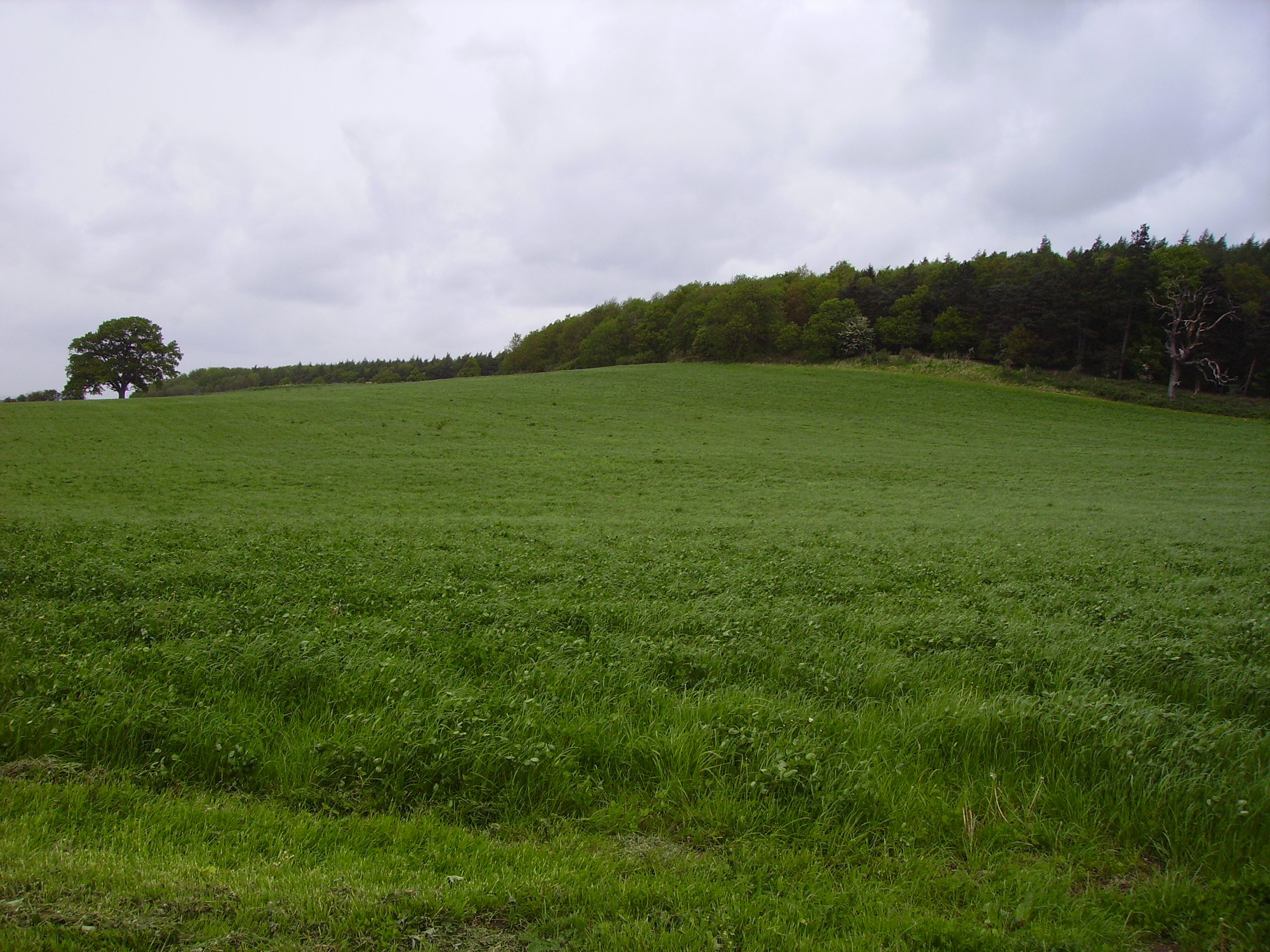
Badbury Hill from the West

Badbury Hill is a hill in the civil parish of Great Coxwell near Faringdon in the English county of Oxfordshire. In 1974 it was transferred from Berkshire.

The summit of the hill is the site of an Iron Age hill fort known as Badbury Camp. It is roughly circular in shape, but most of it was levelled early in the 19th century. It has been suggested as a possible site of the 5th or 6th century Battle of Mons Badonicus, where King Arthur defeated the Anglo-Saxons. On the west side of Badbury Hill is believed to be a World War II firing range, used by the Auxiliary Unity based at Coleshill House as a training firing range. It is now a wooded area, known locally as Badbury Clump, of roughly nine acres, swathed in bluebells in May and is a well-frequented local recreation area for walkers and dog-owners. It is now in the care of the National Trust.

It is also frequented by mountain boarders and bikers who use the downhill course built into the side of the hill. This is maintained and improved by local mountain-board club MEBA with the permission of the Forestry Commission.

== Location ==
Badbury Hill is located at grid reference SU262947, to the west of Faringdon in Oxfordshire, above the village of Great Coxwell. It overlooks the Vale of White Horse to the south and the Thames Valley to the north.
