= List of boundary changes in South East England =

Map of South East England

This is a list of boundary changes occurring in the South East England region of England, since the re-organisation of local government following the passing of the Local Government Act 1972.

== Administrative boundaries ==
=== Initial creation ===
When the Local Government Act 1972 was passed there were still details left to be decided, the Local Government Boundary Commission for England's first work was to clarify these details.

| Date | Statutory Instrument | LGBCE Report |
|---|---|---|
| 1 February 1973 | The English Non-Metropolitan Districts (Definition) Order 1972 | Report No. 001: Recommendations for new Districts in the non-Metropolitan Counties November 1972 |
| 5 March 1973 | The Divided Areas (Boundaries) Order 1973 | n/a |
| 1 May 1973 | The English Non-Metropolitan Districts (Names) Order 1973 | Report No. 002: Names of Non-Metropolitan Districts March 1973 |
| 1 April 1974 | The Charlwood and Horley Act 1974 | n/a |
| 19 August 1976 | Surrey County Council letter amending boundary at Westlands Farm, Charlwood. | n/a |

=== Principal Area Boundary Reviews ===
The Local Government Boundary Commission for England (or LGBCE) was established by the Local Government Act 1972 to review the administrative boundaries of every local authority in England. Between 1974 and 1992 they completed a series of Principal Area Boundary Reviews; reviewing the administrative boundaries of local authorities at their request.

| Date | Statutory Instrument | Effect | LGBCE Report(s) |
|---|---|---|---|
| 1 April 1977 | The Berkshire and Buckinghamshire (Areas) Order 1977 | Changes to the Beaconsfield (Buckinghamshire)/Slough (Berkshire) boundary | Report No. 104: Slough (Berkshire/Buckinghamshire) December 1975 |
| 1 April 1977 | The Berkshire and Oxfordshire (Areas) Order 1977; The Berkshire and Oxfordshire (Areas) (Amendment) Order 1977 | Changes to the Reading (Berkshire)/South Oxfordshire (Oxfordshire) boundary | Report No. 145: Reading (Berkshire/Oxfordshire) March 1976 |
| 1 April 1977 | The Runnymede and Woking (Areas) Order 1977 | Changes to the Runnymede/Woking (both Surrey) boundary | |
| 1 April 1978 | The New Forest and Southampton (Areas) Order 1978 | Changes to the New Forest/Southampton (both Hampshire) boundary | Report No. 250: River Test (Southampton/New Forest) September 1977 |
| 1 April 1981 | The Oxfordshire and Wiltshire (Areas) Order 1980 | Changes to the Thamesdown (Wiltshire)/Vale of White Horse (Oxfordshire) boundary | |
| 1 April 1982 | The Greater London and Buckinghamshire (Areas) Order 1981 | Changes to the Hillingdon (Greater London)/South Bucks (Buckinghamshire) boundary | Report No. 411: Hillingdon/South Buckinghamshire January 1981 |
| 1 April 1983 | The Crawley, Horsham and Mid Sussex (Areas) Order 1982 | Changes to the: Crawley/Horsham (both West Sussex) boundary; Crawley/Mid Sussex (both West Sussex) boundary | Report No. 425: Crawley/Horsham/Mid Sussex May 1982 |
| 1 April 1983 | The Gillingham and Swale (Areas) Order 1982 | Changes to the Gillingham/Swale (both Kent) boundary | Report No. 414: Swale/Gillingham July 1981 |
| 1 April 1984 | The East Hampshire and Havant (Areas) Order 1983 | Changes to the East Hampshire/Havant (both Hampshire) boundary | Report No. 422: East Hampshire/Havant February 1982 |
| 1 April 1984 | The Maidstone and Swale (Areas) Order 1983 | Changes to the Maidstone/Swale (both Kent) boundary | Report No. 430: Swale/Maidstone August 1982 |
| 1 April 1985 | The Adur, Arun and Worthing (Areas) Order 1985 | Changes to the: Adur/Worthing (both West Sussex) boundary; Arun/Worthing (both West Sussex) boundary | Report No. 445: Worthing/Arun/Adur June 1983 |
| 1 April 1985 | The Arun and Chichester (Areas) Order 1985 | Changes to the Arun/Chichester (both West Sussex) boundary | Report No. 448: Arun/Chichester/Worthing June 1983 |
| 1 April 1985 | The Canterbury and Shepway (Areas) Order 1985 | Changes to the Canterbury/Shepway (both Kent) boundary | Report No. 465: Shepway/Canterbury December 1983 |
| 1 April 1985 | The Cherwell and West Oxfordshire (Areas) Order 1985 | Changes to the Cherwell/West Oxfordshire (both Oxfordshire) boundary | Report No. 461: West Oxfordshire/Cherwell December 1983 |
| 1 April 1985 | The Hampshire (Areas) Order 1985 | Changes to the: Winchester/Basingstoke and Deane (both Hampshire) boundary; Winchester/East Hampshire (both Hampshire) boundary; Winchester/Eastleigh (both Hampshire) boundary; Winchester/Test Valley (both Hampshire) boundary | Report No. 450: Winchester/East Hampshire/Basingstoke and Deane/Test Valley/Eastleigh/Havant August 1983 |
| 1 April 1985 | The Horsham and Mid Sussex (Areas) Order 1985 | Changes to the Horsham/Mid Sussex (both West Sussex) boundary | Report No. 453: Horsham/Mid Sussex July 1983 |
| 1 April 1986 | The Isle of Wight (District Boundaries) Order 1985 | Changes to the Medina/South Wight (both Isle of Wight) boundary | Report No. 468: Medina/South Wight March 1984 |
| 1 April 1986 | The Oxfordshire (District Boundaries) Order 1985 | Changes to the South Oxfordshire/Vale of White Horse (both Oxfordshire) boundary | Report No. 489: South Oxfordshire/Vale of White Horse November 1984 |
| 1 April 1986 | The Surrey (District Boundaries) Order 1986 | Changes to the: Guildford/Elmbridge (both Surrey) boundary; Guildford/Mole Valley (both Surrey) boundary; Guildford/Surrey Heath (both Surrey) boundary; Guildford/Waverley (both Surrey) boundary; Guildford/Woking (both Surrey) boundary | Report No. 457: Guildford/Surrey Heath/Woking/Elmbridge/Mole Valley/Waverley November 1983 |
| 1 April 1987 | The Buckinghamshire (District Boundaries) Order 1987 | Changes to the: Chiltern/Wycombe (both Buckinghamshire) boundary; Wycombe/South Bucks (both Buckinghamshire) boundary | Report No. 503: South Bucks/Chiltern/Wycombe July 1985; Report No. 507: Chiltern/Wycombe December 1985 |
| 1 April 1987 | The Kent (District Boundaries) Order 1987 | Changes to the: Canterbury/Dover (both Kent) boundary; Dover/Shepway (both Kent) boundary; Maidstone/Tunbridge Wells (both Kent) boundary; Sevenoaks/Dartford (both Kent) boundary; Gravesham/Dartford (both Kent) boundary | Report No. 494: Gravesham/Dartford/Sevenoaks April 1985; Report No. 502: Tunbridge Wells/Maidstone August 1985; Report No. 506: Dover/Canterbury/Shepway October 1985 |
| 1 April 1990 | The Buckinghamshire (District Boundaries) Order 1990 | Changes to the Chiltern/South Bucks (both Buckinghamshire) boundary | Report No. 570: South Bucks/ChiItern January 1989 |
| 1 April 1990 | The Hampshire (District Boundaries) Order 1990 | Changes to the Rushmoor/Hart (both Hampshire) boundary | Report No. 515: Rushmoor/Hart July 1986 |
| 1 April 1991 | The Oxfordshire (District Boundaries) Order 1991 | Changes to the: Oxford/South Oxfordshire (both Oxfordshire) boundary; Oxford/Cherwell (both Oxfordshire) boundary; Oxford/Vale of White Horse (both Oxfordshire) boundary | Report No. 536: Oxford/Cherwell/South Oxfordshire/Vale of White Horse June 1987; Report No. 561: Oxford/Cherwell/South Oxfordshire/Vale of White Horse (Electoral Consequentials) August 1988 |

Other principal area boundary reviews

- Report No. 514: Eastleigh/Test Valley March 1986
- Report No. 537: Guildford/Mole Valley May 1987

=== Mandatory Reviews of non-Metropolitan Counties, Metropolitan Districts and London Boroughs ===
In 1985 they began the first full administrative review of all non-metropolitan counties. Their reviews of metropolitan counties and Greater London began in 1987 and both reviews were completed in 1992.

| Date | Statutory Instrument | Effect | LGBCE Report(s) |
|---|---|---|---|
| 1 April 1988 | The Northamptonshire and Oxfordshire (County Boundaries) Order 1988 | Changes to the South Northamptonshire (Northamptonshire)/Cherwell (Oxfordshire) boundary | Report No. 538: Oxfordshire July 1987 |
| 1 April 1990 | The Berkshire, Dorset and Wiltshire (County Boundaries) Order 1989 | Changes to the: Kennet (Wiltshire)/Newbury (Berkshire) boundary; Salisbury (Wiltshire)/North Dorset (Dorset) boundary | Report No. 556: Wiltshire July 1988 |
| 1 April 1991 | The Bedfordshire, Buckinghamshire and Cambridgeshire (County Boundaries) Order 1991 | Changes to the: Milton Keynes (Buckinghamshire)/Mid Bedfordshire (Bedfordshire) boundary; Huntingdonshire (Cambridgeshire)/North Bedfordshire (Bedfordshire) boundary; North Bedfordshire (Bedfordshire)/Milton Keynes (Buckinghamshire) boundary; South Bedfordshire (Bedfordshire)/Aylesbury Vale (Buckinghamshire) boundary | Report No. 566: Bedfordshire November 1988 |
| 1 April 1991 | The Berkshire, Buckinghamshire, Hampshire, Oxfordshire and Surrey (County Boundaries) Order 1991 | Changes to the: South Oxfordshire (Oxfordshire)/Newbury (Berkshire) boundary; South Oxfordshire (Oxfordshire)/Wokingham (Berkshire) boundary; Wycombe (Buckinghamshire)/Wokingham (Berkshire) boundary; Wycombe (Buckinghamshire)/Windsor and Maidenhead (Berkshire) boundary; South Bucks (Buckinghamshire)/Windsor and Maidenhead (Berkshire) boundary; South Bucks (Buckinghamshire)/Slough (Berkshire) boundary; Spelthorne (Surrey)/Windsor and Maidenhead (Berkshire) boundary; Runnymede (Surrey)/Windsor and Maidenhead (Berkshire) boundary; Surrey Heath (Surrey)/Windsor and Maidenhead (Berkshire) boundary; Surrey Heath (Surrey)/Bracknell Forest (Berkshire) boundary; Hart (Hampshire)/Bracknell Forest (Berkshire) boundary; Hart (Hampshire)/Wokingham (Berkshire) boundary; Basingstoke and Deane (Hampshire)/Newbury (Berkshire) boundary | |
| 1 April 1991 | The Buckinghamshire, Hertfordshire, Northamptonshire and Oxfordshire (County Boundaries) Order 1991 | Changes to the: South Northamptonshire (Northamptonshire)/Milton Keynes (Buckinghamshire) boundary; Dacorum (Hertfordshire)/Chiltern (Buckinghamshire) boundary; Wycombe (Buckinghamshire)/South Oxfordshire (Oxfordshire) boundary; South Northamptonshire (Northamptonshire)/Aylesbury Vale (Buckinghamshire) boundary; Dacorum (Hertfordshire)/Aylesbury Vale (Buckinghamshire) boundary; Three Rivers (Hertfordshire)/Chiltern (Buckinghamshire) boundary | Report No. 571: Buckinghamshire May 1989 |
| 1 April 1992 | The Dorset, Hampshire, West Sussex and Wiltshire (County Boundaries) Order 1991 | Changes to the: Christchurch (Dorset)/New Forest (Hampshire) boundary; East Dorset (Dorset)/New Forest (Hampshire) boundary; New Forest (Hampshire)/Salisbury (Wiltshire) boundary; Test Valley (Hampshire)/Kennet (Wiltshire) boundary; East Hampshire (Hampshire)/Chichester (West Sussex) boundary; Havant (Hampshire)/Chichester (West Sussex) boundary | Report No. 580: Hampshire January 1990 |
| 1 April 1992 | The Hampshire and Surrey (County Boundaries) Order 1991 | Changes to the: East Hampshire (Hampshire)/Waverley (Surrey) boundary; Hart (Hampshire)/Waverley (Surrey) boundary; Rushmoor (Hampshire)/Waverley (Surrey) boundary; Rushmoor (Hampshire)/Guildford (Surrey) boundary | Report No. 578: Surrey January 1990 |
| 1 April 1993 | The East Sussex, West Sussex and Kent (County Boundaries) Order 1992 | Changes to the: Hove (East Sussex)/Adur (West Sussex) boundary; Lewes (East Sussex)/Mid Sussex (West Sussex) boundary; Wealden (East Sussex)/Mid Sussex (West Sussex) boundary; Brighton (East Sussex)/Mid Sussex (West Sussex) boundary; Rother (East Sussex)/Tunbridge Wells (Kent) boundary; Wealden (East Sussex)/Tunbridge Wells (Kent) boundary | Report No. 602: East Sussex March 1991 |
| 1 April 1993 | The Greater London and Kent (County Boundaries) Order 1992; The Greater London and Kent (County Boundaries) (Variation) Order 1993 | Changes to the Bexley (Greater London)/Dartford (Kent) boundary | Report No. 598: Bexley January 1991 |
| 1 April 1993 | The Surrey and West Sussex (County Boundaries) Order 1992 | Changes to the: Mole Valley (Surrey)/Horsham (West Sussex) boundary; Tandridge (Surrey)/Crawley (West Sussex) boundary; Tandridge (Surrey)/Mid Sussex (West Sussex) boundary; Waverley (Surrey)/Chichester (West Sussex) boundary; Waverley (Surrey)/Horsham (West Sussex) boundary; Reigate and Banstead (Surrey)/Crawley (West Sussex) boundary | Report No. 589: West Sussex July 1990 |
| 1 April 1994 | The Greater London and Surrey (County and London Borough Boundaries) Order 1993 | Changes to the: Croydon/Bromley (both Greater London) boundary; Croydon (Greater London)/Reigate and Banstead (Surrey) boundary; Croydon (Greater London)/Tandridge (Surrey) boundary | Report No. 615: Croydon (Bromley/Outer London) November 1991 |
| 1 April 1994 | The Greater London and Surrey (County and London Borough Boundaries) (No. 2) Order 1993 | Changes to the: Richmond upon Thames/Wandsworth (both Greater London) boundary; Richmond upon Thames (Greater London)/Spelthorne (Surrey) boundary | Report No. 647: Richmond upon Thames May 1992 |
| 1 April 1994 | The Greater London and Surrey (County and London Borough Boundaries) (No. 3) Order 1993 | Changes to the: Sutton/Croydon (both Greater London) boundary; Sutton (Greater London)/Epsom and Ewell (Surrey) boundary; Sutton (Greater London)/Reigate and Banstead (Surrey) boundary; Croydon (Greater London)/Reigate and Banstead (Surrey) boundary | |
| 1 April 1994 | The Greater London and Surrey (County and London Borough Boundaries) (No. 4) Order 1993 | Changes to the: Hounslow/Richmond upon Thames (both Greater London) boundary; Hounslow (Greater London)/Spelthorne (Surrey) boundary; Richmond upon Thames (Greater London)/Spelthorne (Surrey) boundary | Report No. 652: Hounslow August 1992 |
| 1 April 1994 | The Greater London, Kent and Surrey (County Boundaries) Order 1993 | Changes to the: Bexley (Greater London)/Sevenoaks (Kent) boundary; Bromley (Greater London)/Sevenoaks (Kent) boundary; Bromley (Greater London)/Tandridge (Surrey) boundary | Report No. 620: Bromley (Bexley/Outer London) February 1992 |
| 1 April 1994 | The Heathrow Airport (County and London Borough Boundaries) Order 1993 | Changes to the: Hillingdon/Hounslow (both Greater London) boundary; Hillingdon (Greater London)/Spelthorne (Surrey) boundary; Hillingdon (Greater London)/South Bucks (Buckinghamshire) boundary | Report No. 665: Heathrow July 1992 |
| 1 April 1995 | The Kent and East Sussex (County Boundaries) Order 1993 | Changes to the Wealden (East Sussex)/Tunbridge Wells (Kent) boundary | Report No. 684: East Sussex (Further Review) August 1992 |
| 1 April 1995 | The Berkshire, Buckinghamshire and Surrey (County Boundaries) Order 1994 | Changes to the: Slough (Berkshire)/South Bucks (Buckinghamshire) boundary; Slough (Berkshire)/Spelthorne (Surrey) boundary | Report No. 558: Berkshire August 1988 |
| 1 April 1995 | The Greater London and Surrey (County and London Borough Boundaries) Order 1994; The Greater London and Surrey (County and London Borough Boundaries) (Variation) Order 1995 | Changes to the: Kingston upon Thames/Richmond upon Thames (both Greater London) boundary; Kingston upon Thames/Sutton (both Greater London) boundary; Kingston upon Thames (Greater London)/Elmbridge (Surrey) boundary; Kingston upon Thames (Greater London)/Epsom and Ewell (Surrey) boundary; Kingston upon Thames (Greater London)/Mole Valley (Surrey) boundary; Sutton (Greater London)/Epsom and Ewell (Surrey) boundary | Report No. 667: Kingston August 1992 |
| 1 April 1997 | The Runnymede and Spelthorne (Borough Boundaries) Order 1996 | Changes to the Runnymede/Spelthorne (both Surrey) boundary | Structural review: Draft report September 1995 Final report December 1995 |

Other mandatory meviews of non-metropolitan counties, metropolitan districts and London boroughs

- Report No. 519: Isle of Wight October 1986
- Report No. 542: Kent December 1987
- Report No. 574: Gloucestershire February 1989
- Report No. 579: Warwickshire January 1990

== Electoral boundaries ==
=== Initial creation ===
When the Local Government Act 1972 was passed there was not sufficient time to draw up proper electoral boundaries for the new county and district councils, so a temporary system was quickly put in place, intended to only be used for the first elections in 1973.

| Date | Statutory Instrument |
|---|---|
| 7 June 1973 | The County of Berkshire (District Wards) Order 1973 |
| 12 April 1973 | The County of Berkshire (Electoral Divisions) Order 1973 |
| 7 June 1973 | The County of Buckinghamshire (District Wards) Order 1973 |
| 12 April 1973 | The County of Buckinghamshire (Electoral Divisions) Order 1973 |
| 7 June 1973 | The County of East Sussex (District Wards) Order 1973 |
| 12 April 1973 | The County of East Sussex (Electoral Divisions) Order 1973 |
| 7 June 1973 | The County of Hampshire (District Wards) Order 1973 |
| 12 April 1973 | The County of Hampshire (Electoral Divisions) Order 1973 |
| 7 June 1973 | The County of Isle of Wight (District Wards) Order 1973 |
| 12 April 1973 | The County of Isle of Wight (Electoral Divisions) Order 1973 |
| 7 June 1973 | The County of Kent (District Wards) Order 1973 |
| 12 April 1973 | The County of Kent (Electoral Divisions) Order 1973 |
| 7 June 1973 | The County of Oxfordshire (District Wards) Order 1973 |
| 12 April 1973 | The County of Oxfordshire (Electoral Divisions) Order 1973 |
| 7 June 1973 | The County of Surrey (District Wards) Order 1973 |
| 12 April 1973 | The County of Surrey (Electoral Divisions) Order 1973 |
| 7 June 1973 | The County of West Sussex (District Wards) Order 1973 |
| 12 April 1973 | The County of West Sussex (Electoral Divisions) Order 1973 |
| 9 May 1974 | The Charlwood and Horley (Electoral Divisions and Wards) Order 1974; The Charlwood and Horley (Electoral Divisions and Wards) (Amendment) Order 1974 |

=== First periodic review ===
The Local Government Boundary Commission for England (or LGBCE) was established by the Local Government Act 1972 to review the electoral boundaries of every local authority in England. In 1974 they began the first full electoral review of all metropolitan and non-metropolitan districts, completing it in July 1980. Their reviews of the county councils were completed in 1984.

| Date | Statutory Instrument | LGBCE Report |
|---|---|---|
| 6 May 1976 | The Borough of Ashford (Electoral Arrangements) Order 1975 | Report No. 061: Ashford August 1975 |
| 6 May 1976 | The Borough of Eastbourne (Electoral Arrangements) Order 1975 | Report No. 031: Eastbourne July 1975 |
| 6 May 1976 | The Borough of Eastleigh (Electoral Arrangements) Order 1975 | Report No. 069: Eastleigh October 1975 |
| 6 May 1976 | The Borough of Elmbridge (Electoral Arrangements) Order 1975 | Report No. 030: Elmbridge August 1975 |
| 6 May 1976 | The Borough of Epsom and Ewell (Electoral Arrangements) Order 1975 | Report No. 045: Epsom and Ewell September 1975 |
| 6 May 1976 | The Borough of Fareham (Electoral Arrangements) Order 1975 | Report No. 059: Fareham August 1975 |
| 6 May 1976 | The Borough of Guildford (Electoral Arrangements) Order 1975 | Report No. 034: Guildford August 1975 |
| 6 May 1976 | The Borough of Surrey Heath (Electoral Arrangements) Order 1975 | Report No. 040: Surrey Heath August 1975 |
| 6 May 1976 | The District of Aylesbury Vale (Electoral Arrangements) Order 1975 | Report No. 058: Aylesbury Vale September 1975 |
| 6 May 1976 | The District of Basingstoke (Electoral Arrangements) Order 1975 | Report No. 029: Basingstoke July 1975 |
| 6 May 1976 | The District of Chiltern (Electoral Arrangements) Order 1975 | Report No. 062: Chiltern September 1975 |
| 6 May 1976 | The District of Dartford (Electoral Arrangements) Order 1975 | Report No. 018: Dartford July 1975 |
| 6 May 1976 | The District of Mole Valley (Electoral Arrangements) Order 1975 | Report No. 050: Mole Valley September 1975 |
| 6 May 1976 | The District of Runnymede (Electoral Arrangements) Order 1975 | Report No. 019: Runnymede July 1975 |
| 6 May 1976 | The District of Tandridge (Electoral Arrangements) Order 1975 | Report No. 023: Tandridge June 1975 |
| 6 May 1976 | The District of Test Valley (Electoral Arrangements) Order 1975 | Report No. 070: Test Valley October 1975 |
| 3 May 1979 | The Borough of Gillingham (Electoral Arrangements) Order 1976 | Report No. 096: Gillingham November 1975 |
| 6 May 1976 | The Borough of Havant (Electoral Arrangements) Order 1976 | Report No. 116: Havant December 1975 |
| 3 May 1979 | The Borough of Maidstone (Electoral Arrangements) Order 1976 | Report No. 101: Maidstone October 1975 |
| 3 May 1979 | The Borough of Medina (Electoral Arrangements) Order 1976 | Report No. 158: Medina July 1976 |
| 3 May 1979 | The Borough of Medway (Electoral Arrangements) Order 1976 | Report No. 118: Medway December 1975 |
| 6 May 1976 | The Borough of Milton Keynes (Electoral Arrangements) Order 1976 | Report No. 124: Milton Keynes December 1975 |
| 3 May 1979 | The Borough of Reigate and Banstead (Electoral Arrangements) Order 1976 | Report No. 144: Reigate and Banstead February 1976 |
| 3 May 1979 | The Borough of Rushmoor (Electoral Arrangements) Order 1976 | Report No. 103: Rushmoor November 1975 |
| 3 May 1979 | The Borough of South Wight (Electoral Arrangements) Order 1976 | Report No. 156: South Wight July 1976 |
| 3 May 1979 | The Borough of Spelthorne (Electoral Arrangements) Order 1976 | Report No. 046: Spelthorne August 1975 |
| 6 May 1976 | The Borough of Tunbridge Wells (Electoral Arrangements) Order 1976 | Report No. 079: Tunbridge Wells October 1975 |
| 6 May 1976 | The Borough of Woking (Electoral Arrangements) Order 1976 | Report No. 094: Woking November 1975 |
| 3 May 1979 | The City of Canterbury (Electoral Arrangements) Order 1976 | Report No. 123: Canterbury December 1975 |
| 3 May 1979 | The City of Southampton (Electoral Arrangements) Order 1976 | Report No. 105: Southampton November 1975 |
| 6 May 1976 | The City of Winchester (Electoral Arrangements) Order 1976 | Report No. 106: Winchester November 1975 |
| 3 May 1979 | The District of East Hampshire (Electoral Arrangements) Order 1976 | Report No. 134: East Hampshire January 1976 |
| 6 May 1976 | The District of Hart (Electoral Arrangements) Order 1976 | Report No. 129: Hart January 1976 |
| 6 May 1976 | The District of New Forest (Electoral Arrangements) Order 1976 | Report No. 130: New Forest January 1976 |
| 3 May 1979 | The District of Sevenoaks (Electoral Arrangements) Order 1976 | Report No. 152: Sevenoaks June 1976 |
| 3 May 1979 | The District of Swale (Electoral Arrangements) Order 1976 | Report No. 148: Swale March 1976 |
| 3 May 1979 | The District of Tonbridge and Malling (Electoral Arrangements) Order 1976 | Report No. 122: Tonbridge and Mailing January 1976 |
| 3 May 1979 | The Borough of Crawley (Electoral Arrangements) Order 1977 | Report No. 183: Crawley February 1977 |
| 3 May 1979 | The Borough of Gravesham (Electoral Arrangements) Order 1977 | Report No. 221: Gravesham July 1977 |
| 3 May 1979 | The City of Oxford (Electoral Arrangements) Order 1977 | Report No. 215: Oxford May 1977 |
| 3 May 1979 | The District of Bracknell (Electoral Arrangements) Order 1977 | Report No. 196: Bracknell March 1977 |
| 3 May 1979 | The District of Chichester (Electoral Arrangements) Order 1977 | Report No. 184: Chichester February 1977 |
| 3 May 1979 | The District of West Oxfordshire (Electoral Arrangements) Order 1977 | Report No. 170: West Oxfordshire October 1976 |
| 3 May 1979 | The Borough of Gosport (Electoral Arrangements) Order 1978 | Report No. 201: Gosport April 1977 |
| 3 May 1979 | The Borough of Hastings (Electoral Arrangements) Order 1978 | Report No. 259: Hastings October 1977 |
| 3 May 1979 | The Borough of Hove (Electoral Arrangements) Order 1978 | Report No. 275: Hove January 1978 |
| 3 May 1979 | The District of Adur (Electoral Arrangements) Order 1978 | Report No. 251: Adur September 1977 |
| 3 May 1979 | The District of Cherwell (Electoral Arrangements) Order 1978 | Report No. 243: Cherwell August 1977 |
| 3 May 1979 | The District of Dover (Electoral Arrangements) Order 1978 | Report No. 274: Dover January 1978 |
| 3 May 1979 | The District of Horsham (Electoral Arrangements) Order 1978 | Report No. 305: Horsham October 1978 |
| 3 May 1979 | The District of Shepway (Electoral Arrangements) Order 1978 | Report No. 303: Shepway October 1978 |
| 3 May 1979 | The District of Thanet (Electoral Arrangements) Order 1978 | Report No. 160: Thanet August 1976 |
| 3 May 1979 | The District of Vale of White Horse (Electoral Arrangements) Order 1978 | Report No. 232: Vale of White Horse August 1977 |
| 3 May 1979 | The District of Wokingham (Electoral Arrangements) Order 1978 | Report No. 282: Wokingham August 1978 |
| 5 May 1983 | The Borough of Reading (Electoral Arrangements) Order 1979 | Report No. 331: Reading April 1979 |
| 5 May 1983 | The Borough of Worthing (Electoral Arrangements) Order 1979 | Report No. 304: Worthing October 1978 |
| 5 May 1983 | The City of Portsmouth (Electoral Arrangements) Order 1979 | Report No. 338: Portsmouth May 1979 |
| 5 May 1983 | The District of Lewes (Electoral Arrangements) Order 1979 | Report No. 326: Lewes March 1979 |
| 5 May 1983 | The District of Newbury (Electoral Arrangements) Order 1979 | Report No. 321: Newbury March 1979 |
| 5 May 1983 | The District of Waverley (Electoral Arrangements) Order 1979 | Report No. 309: Waverley November 1978 |
| 5 May 1983 | The District of Wealden (Electoral Arrangements) Order 1979 | Report No. 327: Wealden April 1979 |
| 5 May 1983 | The Borough of Brighton (Electoral Arrangements) Order 1980 | Report No. 361: Brighton November 1979 |
| 5 May 1983 | The Borough of Slough (Electoral Arrangements) Order 1980 | Report No. 363: Slough November 1979 |
| 7 May 1981 | The County of Isle of Wight (Electoral Arrangements) Order 1980 | Report No. 388: Isle of Wight July 1980 |
| 7 May 1981 | The County of Surrey (Electoral Arrangements) Order 1980 | Report No. 394: Surrey August 1980 |
| 5 May 1983 | The District of Arun (Electoral Arrangements) Order 1980 | Report No. 369: Arun January 1980 |
| 5 May 1983 | The District of Mid Sussex (Electoral Arrangements) Order 1980 | Report No. 374: Mid Sussex February 1980 |
| 5 May 1983 | The District of Rother (Electoral Arrangements) Order 1980 | Report No. 362: Rother November 1979 |
| 5 May 1983 | The District of South Bucks (Electoral Arrangements) Order 1980 | Report No. 366: South Bucks December 1979 |
| 5 May 1983 | The District of South Oxfordshire (Electoral Arrangements) Order 1980 | Report No. 385: South Oxfordshire June 1980 |
| 5 May 1983 | The District of Wycombe (Electoral Arrangements) Order 1980 | Report No. 371: Wycombe January 1980 |
| 5 May 1983 | The Royal Borough of Windsor and Maidenhead (Electoral Arrangements) Order 1980 | Report No. 376: Windsor and Maidenhead February 1980 |
| 7 May 1981 | The County of Hampshire (Electoral Arrangements) Order 1981 | Report No. 397: Hampshire October 1980 |
| 7 May 1981 | The County of Kent (Electoral Arrangements) Order 1981 | Report No. 402: Kent November 1980 |
| 2 May 1985 | The County of East Sussex (Electoral Arrangements) Order 1982 | Report No. 417: East Sussex August 1981 |
| 2 May 1985 | The County of Buckinghamshire (Electoral Arrangements) Order 1983 | Report No. 438: Buckinghamshire December 1982 |
| 2 May 1985 | The County of Oxfordshire (Electoral Arrangements) Order 1983 | Report No. 428: Oxfordshire June 1982 |
| 2 May 1985 | The Royal County of Berkshire (Electoral Arrangements) Order 1984 | Report No. 452: Berkshire July 1983 |
| 2 May 1985 | The County of West Sussex (Electoral Arrangements) Order 1985 | Report No. 473: West Sussex June 1984 |

=== Further electoral reviews by the LGBCE ===
Local authorities could request a further review if they felt that there were changes in circumstances since the initial review. The LGBCE would only approve this if they felt it was appropriate because of major changes in the size or distribution of the electorate.

| Date | Statutory Instrument | LGBCE Report |
|---|---|---|
| 2 May 1991 | The Borough of Tonbridge and Malling (Electoral Arrangements) Order 1989 | Report No. 560: Tonbridge and Mailing September 1988 |
| 7 May 1992 | The Borough of Basingstoke and Deane (Electoral Arrangements) Order 1992 | Report No. 613: Basingstoke and Deane October 1991 |

=== Second periodic review ===
The Local Government Act 1992 established the Local Government Commission for England (or LGCE) as the successor to the LGBCE. In 1996 they began the second full electoral review of English local authorities. On 1 April 2002 the Boundary Committee for England (or BCfE) took over the functions of the LGBCE and carried on the review, completing it in 2004.

| Date | Statutory Instrument | LGCE/BCfE Report(s) |
|---|---|---|
| 1 May 1997 | The District of the Medway Towns (Parishes and Electoral Changes) Order 1997 | Draft report 3 September 1996 Final report 6 December 1996 |
| 4 May 2000 | The Borough of Elmbridge (Electoral Changes) Order 1999 | Draft report March 1998 Final report 1 September 1998 |
| 1 May 2003 | The Borough of Epsom and Ewell (Electoral Changes) Order 1999 | Draft report March 1998 Final report 1 September 1998 |
| 1 May 2003 | The Borough of Guildford (Electoral Changes) Order 1999 | Draft report February 1998 Final report 1 September 1998 |
| 4 May 2000 | The Borough of Reigate and Banstead (Electoral Changes) Order 1999 | Draft report March 1998 Final report 1 September 1998 |
| 4 May 2000 | The Borough of Runnymede (Electoral Changes) Order 1999 | Draft report March 1998 Final report 1 September 1998 |
| 1 May 2003 | The Borough of Spelthorne (Electoral Changes) Order 1999 | Draft report March 1998 Final report 1 September 1998 |
| 1 May 2003 | The Borough of Surrey Heath (Electoral Changes) Order 1999 | Draft report March 1998 Final report 1 September 1998 |
| 1 May 2003 | The Borough of Waverley (Electoral Changes) Order 1999; The Borough of Waverley (Electoral Changes) (Amendment) Order 2000; The Borough of Waverley (Electoral Changes) (Amendment) Order 2006 | Draft report February 1998 Final report 1 September 1998 |
| 4 May 2000 | The Borough of Woking (Electoral Changes) Order 1999 | Draft report March 1998 Final report 1 September 1998 |
| 4 May 2000 | The District of Mole Valley (Electoral Changes) Order 1999 | Draft report February 1998 Final report 1 September 1998 |
| 4 May 2000 | The District of Tandridge (Electoral Changes) Order 1999 | Draft report March 1998 Final report 1 September 1998 |
| 7 June 2001 | The Isle of Wight (Electoral Changes) Order 1999; The Isle of Wight (Electoral Changes) Order 2000 | Draft report October 1996 Final report June 1997 |
| 1 May 2003 | The Borough of Ashford (Electoral Changes) Order 2001 | Draft report 17 October 2000 Final report 8 May 2001 |
| 2 May 2002 | The Borough of Basingstoke and Deane (Electoral Changes) Order 2001; The Borough of Basingstoke and Deane (Electoral Changes) (Amendment) Order 2004 | Draft report February 2000 Final report 25 July 2000 |
| 1 May 2003 | The Borough of Dartford (Electoral Changes) Order 2001 | Draft report 17 October 2000 Final report 8 May 2001 |
| 2 May 2002 | The Borough of Eastbourne (Electoral Changes) Order 2001 | Draft report 20 February 2001 Final report 7 August 2001 |
| 2 May 2002 | The Borough of Eastleigh (Parishes and Electoral Changes) Order 2001 | Draft report 18 January 2000 Final report 25 July 2000 |
| 2 May 2002 | The Borough of Fareham (Electoral Changes) Order 2001 | Draft report 18 January 2000 Final report 25 July 2000 |
| 2 May 2002 | The Borough of Gosport (Electoral Changes) Order 2001 | Draft report 18 January 2000 Final report 25 July 2000 |
| 1 May 2003 | The Borough of Gravesham (Electoral Changes) Order 2001 | Draft report 17 October 2000 Final report 8 May 2001 |
| 2 May 2002 | The Borough of Hastings (Electoral Changes) Order 2001 | Draft report 20 February 2001 Final report 7 August 2001 |
| 2 May 2002 | The Borough of Havant (Electoral Changes) Order 2001 | Draft report 18 January 2000 Final report 25 July 2000 |
| 2 May 2002 | The Borough of Maidstone (Electoral Changes) Order 2001 | Draft report 14 November 2000 Final report 8 May 2001 |
| 2 May 2002 | The Borough of Milton Keynes (Electoral Changes) Order 2001; The Borough of Milton Keynes (Electoral Changes) (Amendment) Order 2002 | Draft report 27 February 2001 Final report 7 August 2001 |
| 2 May 2002 | The Borough of Rushmoor (Electoral Changes) Order 2001 | Draft report 18 January 2000 Final report 25 July 2000 |
| 2 May 2002 | The Borough of Swale (Electoral Changes) Order 2001 | Draft report 17 October 2000 Final report 8 May 2001 |
| 1 May 2003 | The Borough of Test Valley (Electoral Changes) Order 2001 | Draft report 22 February 2000 Final report 25 July 2000 |
| 2 May 2002 | The Borough of Tunbridge Wells (Electoral Changes) Order 2001; The Borough of Tunbridge Wells (Electoral Changes) (Amendment) Order 2006 | Draft report 14 November 2000 Final report 9 May 2001 |
| 1 May 2003 | The City of Brighton and Hove (Electoral Changes) Order 2001 | Draft report 20 February 2001 Final report 7 August 2001 |
| 1 May 2003 | The City of Canterbury (Electoral Changes) Order 2001 | Draft report 17 October 2000 Final report 8 May 2001 |
| 2 May 2002 | The City of Oxford (Electoral Changes) Order 2001 | Draft report 20 February 2001 Final report 7 August 2001 |
| 2 May 2002 | The City of Portsmouth (Electoral Changes) Order 2001 | Draft report 18 January 2000 Final report 25 July 2000 |
| 2 May 2002 | The City of Southampton (Electoral Changes) Order 2001 | Draft report 18 January 2000 Final report 25 July 2000 |
| 2 May 2002 | The City of Winchester (Electoral Changes) Order 2001 | Draft report 22 February 2000 Final report 25 July 2000 |
| 2 May 2002 | The District of Cherwell (Electoral Changes) Order 2001 | Draft report 20 February 2001 Final report 7 August 2001 |
| 1 May 2003 | The District of Dover (Electoral Changes) Order 2001 | Draft report 14 November 2000 Final report 9 May 2001 |
| 1 May 2003 | The District of East Hampshire (Electoral Changes) Order 2001 | Draft report 18 January 2000 Final report 25 July 2000 |
| 2 May 2002 | The District of Hart (Parishes and Electoral Changes) Order 2001 | Draft report 18 January 2000 Final report 25 July 2000 |
| 1 May 2003 | The District of Lewes (Electoral Changes) Order 2001 | Draft report 20 February 2001 Final report 7 August 2001 |
| 1 May 2003 | The District of New Forest (Parishes and Electoral Changes) Order 2001 | Draft report 22 February 2000 Final report 25 July 2000 |
| 1 May 2003 | The District of Rother (Electoral Changes) Order 2001 | Draft report 20 February 2001 Final report 25 July 2000 |
| 1 May 2003 | The District of Sevenoaks (Electoral Changes) Order 2001 | Draft report 17 October 2000 Final report 8 May 2001 |
| 1 May 2003 | The District of Shepway (Electoral Changes) Order 2001 | Draft report 14 November 2000 Final report 8 May 2001 |
| 1 May 2003 | The District of South Oxfordshire (Electoral Changes) Order 2001 | Draft report 20 February 2001 Final report 7 August 2001 |
| 1 May 2003 | The District of Thanet (Electoral Changes) Order 2001 | Draft report 14 November 2000 Final report 9 May 2001 |
| 1 May 2003 | The District of Vale of White Horse (Electoral Changes) Order 2001 | Draft report 20 February 2001 Final report 7 August 2001 |
| 1 May 2003 | The District of Wealden (Electoral Changes) Order 2001 | Draft report 20 February 2001 Final report 7 August 2001 |
| 2 May 2002 | The District of West Oxfordshire (Electoral Changes) Order 2001 | Draft report 20 February 2001 Final report 7 August 2001 |
| 1 May 2003 | The Tonbridge and Malling (Electoral Changes) Order 2001 | Draft report 17 October 2000 Final report 9 May 2001 |
| 1 May 2003 | The Borough of Bracknell Forest (Electoral Changes) Order 2002 | Draft report 27 November 2001 Final report 23 April 2002 |
| 10 June 2004 | The Borough of Crawley (Electoral Changes) Order 2002 | Draft report 26 February 2002 Final report 9 July 2002 |
| 1 May 2003 | The Borough of Medway (Electoral Changes) Order 2002 | Draft report 19 June 2001 Final report 4 December 2001 |
| 10 June 2004 | The Borough of Reading (Electoral Changes) Order 2002 | Draft report 15 January 2002 Final report 6 June 2002 |
| 10 June 2004 | The Borough of Slough (Electoral Changes) Order 2002 | Draft report 15 January 2002 Final report 6 June 2002 |
| 10 June 2004 | The Borough of Worthing (Electoral Changes) Order 2002 | Draft report 26 February 2002 Final report 9 July 2002 |
| 10 June 2004 | The District of Adur (Electoral Changes) Order 2002 | Draft report 26 February 2002 Final report 9 July 2002 |
| 1 May 2003 | The District of Arun (Electoral Changes) Order 2002 | Draft report 26 February 2002 Final report 9 July 2002 |
| 1 May 2003 | The District of Aylesbury Vale (Electoral Changes) Order 2002 | Draft report 8 May 2001 Final report 20 November 2001 |
| 1 May 2003 | The District of Chichester (Electoral Changes) Order 2002 | Draft report 26 February 2002 Final report 9 July 2002 |
| 1 May 2003 | The District of Chiltern (Electoral Changes) Order 2002; The District of Chiltern (Electoral Changes) (Amendment) Order 2004 | Draft report 8 May 2001 Final report 20 November 2001 |
| 1 May 2003 | The District of Horsham (Electoral Changes) Order 2002 | Draft report 26 February 2002 Final report 9 July 2002 |
| 1 May 2003 | The District of Mid Sussex (Electoral Changes) Order 2002 | Draft report 26 February 2002 Final report 9 July 2002 |
| 1 May 2003 | The District of South Bucks (Electoral Changes) Order 2002 | Draft report 9 May 2001 Final report 20 November 2001 |
| 1 May 2003 | The District of West Berkshire (Electoral Changes) Order 2002 | Draft report 9 October 2001 Final report 3 April 2002 |
| 10 June 2004 | The District of Wokingham (Electoral Changes) Order 2002 | Draft report 22 January 2002 Final report 6 June 2002 |
| 1 May 2003 | The District of Wycombe (Electoral Changes) Order 2002 | Draft report 8 May 2001 Final report 20 November 2001 |
| 1 May 2003 | The Royal Borough of Windsor and Maidenhead (Electoral Changes) Order 2002 | Draft report 27 November 2001 Final report 23 April 2002 |
| 5 May 2005 | The County of East Sussex (Electoral Changes) Order 2004 | Draft report 13 January 2004 Final report 27 July 2004 |
| 5 May 2005 | The County of Hampshire (Electoral Changes) Order 2004 | Draft report 23 January 2004 Final report 27 July 2004 |
| 5 May 2005 | The County of Kent (Electoral Changes) Order 2004 | Draft report 12 August 2003 Final report 27 April 2004 |
| 5 May 2005 | The County of Oxfordshire (Electoral Changes) Order 2004 | Draft report 13 January 2004 Final report 27 July 2004 |
| 5 May 2005 | The County of Surrey (Electoral Changes) Order 2004 | Draft report 22 February 2000 Final report 22 August 2000 |
| 5 May 2005 | The County of Buckinghamshire (Electoral Changes) Order 2005 | Draft report 9 March 2004 Final report 14 September 2004 |
| 5 May 2005 | The County of West Sussex (Electoral Changes) Order 2005 | Draft report 24 February 2004 Final report 14 September 2004 |

=== Further electoral reviews by the BCfE ===
| Date | Statutory Instrument | BCfE Report(s) |
|---|---|---|
| 1 May 2008 | The Borough of Basingstoke and Deane (Electoral Changes) Order 2008 | Draft report February 2007 Final report October 2007 |
| 4 June 2009 | The Isle of Wight (Electoral Changes) Order 2008 | Draft report Final report June 2008 |
| 4 June 2009 | The County of West Sussex (Electoral Changes) Order 2009 | Draft report July 2008 Final report November 2008 |

=== Further electoral reviews by the LGBCE ===
The Local Government Boundary Commission for England (or LGBCE) was established by the Local Democracy, Economic Development and Construction Act 2009 on 1 April 2010 as the successor to the BCfE. It continues to review the electoral arrangements of English local authorities on an 'as and when' basis.

| Date | Statutory Instrument | LGBCE Report(s) |
|---|---|---|
| 2 May 2013 | The Buckinghamshire (Electoral Changes) Order 2012 | Final report January 2012 |
| 22 May 2014 | The Hart (Electoral Changes) Order 2012 | Final report January 2012 |
| 2 May 2013 | The Oxfordshire (Electoral Changes) Order 2012 | Final report January 2012 |
| 3 May 2012 | The Rushmoor (Electoral Changes) Order 2012 | Final report October 2011 |
| 22 May 2014 | The Slough (Electoral Changes) Order 2012 | Final report May 2012 |
| 2 May 2013 | The Surrey (Electoral Changes) Order 2012 | Final report January 2012 |
| 7 May 2015 | The Arun (Electoral Changes) Order 2013 | Final report February 2013 |
| 7 May 2015 | The Aylesbury Vale (Electoral Changes) Order 2014 | Final report July 2014 |
| 7 May 2015 | The Canterbury (Electoral Changes) Order 2014 | Final report August 2014 |
| 22 May 2014 | The Milton Keynes (Electoral Changes) Order 2014 | Final report June 2013 |
| 7 May 2015 | The Shepway (Electoral Changes) Order 2014 | Final report January 2014 |
| 7 May 2015 | The South Bucks (Electoral Changes) Order 2015 | Final report October 2014 |
| 7 May 2015 | The South Oxfordshire (Electoral Changes) Order 2014 | Final report March 2013 |
| 7 May 2015 | The Swale (Electoral Changes) Order 2012 | Final report August 2012 |
| 7 May 2015 | The Tonbridge and Malling (Electoral Changes) Order 2013 | Final report October 2012 |
| 4 May 2023 | The Southampton (Electoral Changes) Order 2023 | Final report November 2022 |
| 7 May 2015 | The Vale of White Horse (Electoral Changes) Order 2014 | Final report March 2013 |
| 5 May 2016 | The Cherwell (Electoral Changes) Order 2015 | Final report May 2015 |
| 5 May 2016 | The Winchester (Electoral Changes) Order 2015 | Final report June 2015 |
| 5 May 2016 | The Woking (Electoral Changes) Order 2015 | Final report January 2015 |
| 5 May 2016 | The Elmbridge (Electoral Changes) Order 2016 | |
| 4 May 2017 | The East Sussex (Electoral Changes) Order 2016 | Final report September 2016 |
| 4 May 2017 | The Hampshire (Electoral Changes) Order 2016 | Final report September 2016 |
| 4 May 2017 | The Kent (Electoral Changes) Order 2016 | Final report January 2016 |
| 4 May 2017 | The West Sussex (Electoral Changes) Order 2016 | Final report August 2016 |
| 3 May 2018 | The Eastleigh (Electoral Changes) Order 2016 | Final report September 2016 |
| 3 May 2018 | The Hastings (Electoral Changes) Order 2016 | Final report March 2016 |
| 2 May 2019 | The Ashford (Electoral Changes) Order 2017 | Final report June 2017 |
| 2 May 2019 | The Chichester (Electoral Changes) Order 2017 | Final report December 2016 |
| 2 May 2019 | The Crawley (Electoral Changes) Order 2019 | Final report October 2018 |
| 2 May 2019 | The East Hampshire (Electoral Changes) Order 2018 | Final report April 2018 |
| 2 May 2019 | The Eastbourne (Electoral Changes) Order 2016 | Final report September 2016 |
| 2 May 2019 | The Dartford (Electoral Changes) Order 2018 | Final report June 2018 |
| 2 May 2019 | The Dover (Electoral Changes) Order 2019 | Final report October 2018 |
| 2 May 2019 | The Horsham (Electoral Changes) Order 2017 | Final report June 2017 |
| 2 May 2019 | The Lewes (Electoral Changes) Order 2016 | Final report September 2016 |
| 2 May 2019 | The Reigate and Banstead (Electoral Changes) Order 2019 | Final report October 2018 |
| 2 May 2019 | The Rother (Electoral Changes) Order 2016 | Final report September 2016 |
| 2 May 2019 | The Runnymede (Electoral Changes) Order 2019 | Final report September 2018 |
| 2 May 2019 | The Surrey Heath (Electoral Changes) Order 2017 | Final report August 2017 |
| 2 May 2019 | The Wealden (Electoral Changes) Order 2016 | Final report September 2016 |
| 2 May 2019 | The Test Valley (Electoral Changes) Order 2018 | Final report October 2017 |
| 2 May 2019 | The West Berkshire (Electoral Changes) Order 2018 | Final report January 2018 |
| 2 May 2019 | The Windsor and Maidenhead (Electoral Changes) Order 2018 | Final report July 2018 |
| 6 May 2021 | The Basingstoke and Deane (Electoral Changes) Order 2019 | Final report March 2019 |
| 6 May 2021 | The Isle of Wight (Electoral Changes) Order 2020 | Final report June 2019 |
| 6 May 2021 | The Oxford (Electoral Changes) Order 2019 | Final report February 2019 |
| 5 May 2022 | The Gosport (Electoral Changes) Order 2022 | Final report November 2021 |
| 5 May 2022 | The Reading (Electoral Changes) Order 2021 | Final report September 2020 |
| 4 May 2023 | The Bracknell Forest (Electoral Changes) Order 2021 | Final report December 2020 |
| 4 May 2023 | The Brighton and Hove (Electoral Changes) Order 2023 | Final report October 2022 |
| 4 May 2023 | The Epsom and Ewell (Electoral Changes) Order 2022 | Final report March 2022 |
| 4 May 2023 | The Gravesham (Electoral Changes) Order 2022 | Final report April 2022 |
| 4 May 2023 | The Guildford (Electoral Changes) Order 2022 | Final report May 2022 |
| 4 May 2023 | The Medway (Electoral Changes) Order 2021 | Final report March 2021 |
| 4 May 2023 | The Mid Sussex (Electoral Changes) Order 2022 | Final report February 2022 |
| 4 May 2023 | The Mole Valley (Electoral Changes) Order 2023 | Final report September 2022 |
| 4 May 2023 | The New Forest (Electoral Changes) Order 2021 | Final report January 2021 |
| 4 May 2023 | The Slough (Electoral Changes) Order 2023 | Final report November 2022 |
| 4 May 2023 | The Southampton (Electoral Changes) Order 2023 | Final report November 2022 |
| 4 May 2023 | The Tonbridge and Malling (Electoral Changes) Order 2022 | Final report March 2022 |
| 4 May 2023 | The Waverley (Electoral Changes) Order 2022 | Final report March 2022 |
| 2 May 2024 | The Fareham (Electoral Changes) Order 2023 | Final report February 2023 |
| 2 May 2024 | The Havant (Electoral Changes) Order 2023 | Final report March 2022 |
| 2 May 2024 | The Maidstone (Electoral Changes) Order 2023 | Final report November 2022 |
| 2 May 2024 | The Tandridge (Electoral Changes) Order 2024 | Final report October 2023 |
| 2 May 2024 | The Tunbridge Wells (Electoral Changes) Order 2024 | Final report May 2023 |
| 2 May 2024 | The Wokingham (Electoral Changes) Order 2023 | Final report July 2023 |
| 1 May 2025 | The Buckinghamshire (Electoral Changes) Order 2023 | Final report May 2023 |
| 1 May 2025 | The Oxfordshire (Electoral Changes) Order 2025 | Final report July 2024 |
| 7 May 2026 | The Milton Keynes (Electoral Changes) Order 2025 | Final report June 2025 |
| 7 May 2026 | The Surrey (Electoral Changes) Order 2024 (Note: Boundaries used for the new councils of East Surrey and West Surrey.) | Final report May 2024 |
| 6 May 2027 | The Canterbury (Electoral Changes) Order 2025 | Final report July 2024 |

=== Changes resulting from parish council boundary changes ===
These orders were made to subsequent to changes to civil parish boundaries.

| Date | Statutory Instrument | Cause |
|---|---|---|
| 3 May 2007; 4 June 2009 | The Aylesbury Vale (Parish Electoral Arrangements and Electoral Changes) Order 2007; The Aylesbury Vale (Parish Electoral Arrangements and Electoral Changes) (Amendment) Order 2009 | Creation of Calvert Green; Changes to the boundaries of Aylesbury, Bierton with Broughton, Charndon, Fleet Marston, Maids Moreton, Marsworth, Pitstone, Quarrendon, Steeple Claydon, Stoke Mandeville, Stone with Bishopstone and Hartwell, Thornborough, Weedon, Weston Turville, Wing, and Wingrave with Rowsham |
| 3 May 2007; 4 June 2009 | The Chiltern (Parish Electoral Arrangements and Electoral Changes) Order 2007 | Transfer of areas between Great Missenden and Little Missenden |
| 3 May 2007 | The South Bucks (Parish Electoral Arrangements and Electoral Changes) Order 2007 | Changes to the boundaries of Denham, Dorney, Fulmer, Gerrards Cross, Iver, Taplow, and Wexham |
| 3 May 2007; 4 June 2009 | The Tandridge (Electoral Changes) Order 2007 | Changes to the boundaries of Bletchingley, Burstow, Nutfield, and Outwood |
| 3 May 2007; 4 June 2009 | The Wealden (Parish Electoral Arrangements and Electoral Changes) Order 2007 | Transfers of areas between the following parishes: Arlington to Chalvington with Ripe; Buxted to Uckfield; Frant to Wadhurst; Hailsham to Arlington; Long Man to Willingdon and Jevington; Polegate to Willingdon and Jevington; Westham to Polegate; Westham to Willingdon and Jevington; Willingdon and Jevington to Polegate; Willingdon and Jevington to Westham |
| 4 June 2009; 5 May 2011 | The Maidstone (Electoral Changes) Order 2008 | Transfers of areas between the following parishes: Tovil to Loose; Coxheath to Loose |
| 5 May 2011 | The New Forest (Electoral Changes) Order 2011 | Transfers of areas between the following parishes: Fordingbridge to Godshill; Godshill to Breamore |
| 22 May 2014; 5 May 2016 | The District of West Oxfordshire (Electoral Changes) Order 2012 | Transfers of areas between the following parishes: Cornbury and Wychwood to Finstock; Brize Norton to Minster Lovell; Burford to Shilton; Ramsden to Finstock; Shilton to Carterton |
| 7 May 2015; 4 May 2017 | The Horsham (Electoral Changes) Order 2014 | Transfer of areas from Shipley to Southwater |
| 2 May 2019 | The Sevenoaks (Electoral Changes) Order 2016 | Transfer of areas from Chevening to Sevenoaks Weald |

== Structural changes ==
| Date | Statutory Instrument | LGCE Report(s) |
|---|---|---|
| 1 April 1995 | The Isle of Wight (Structural Change) Order 1994 | Draft report December 1992 Final report April 1993 |
| 1 April 1997 | The Buckinghamshire (Borough of Milton Keynes) (Structural Change) Order 1995 | Draft report June 1994 Final report October 1994 |
| 1 April 1997 | The East Sussex (Boroughs of Brighton and Hove) (Structural Change) Order 1995 | Draft report July 1994 Final report December 1994 |
| 1 April 1997 | The Hampshire (Cities of Portsmouth and Southampton) (Structural Change) Order 1995 | Draft report June 1994 Final report October 1994 |
| 1 April 1998 | The Kent (Borough of Gillingham and City of Rochester upon Medway) (Structural Change) Order 1996 | Draft report June 1994 Final report October 1994; Draft report September 1995 Final report December 1995 |
| 1 April 1998 | The Berkshire (Structural Change) Order 1996 | Draft report June 1994 Final report December 1994 |
| 1 April 2020 | The Buckinghamshire (Structural Changes) Order 2019 | |
| 1 April 2027 | The Surrey (Structural Changes) Order 2026 | |

Other structural reviews

- Oxfordshire - Draft report July 1994 Final report October 1994
- Surrey - Draft report July 1994 Final report December 1994
- West Sussex - Draft report July 1994 Final report December 1994
- A report on the 1992-1995 Structural Review May 1995
- Overview report of 21 Districts in England September 1995
