= Swinford, Oxfordshire =

Hamlet in Oxfordshire, England

Coordinates: 51°46′24″N 1°21′25″W

Swinford
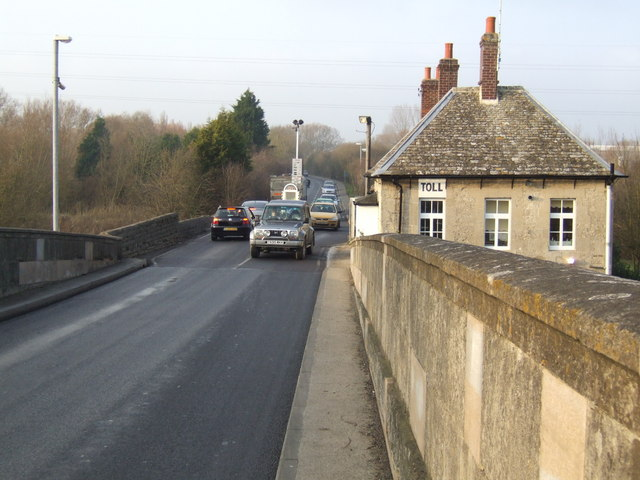
- Toll station and house on Swinford Bridge

- Location within Oxfordshire
- Civil parish: Cumnor
- District: Vale of White Horse
- Shire county: Oxfordshire
- Region: South East
- Country: England
- Sovereign state: United Kingdom
- Post town: WITNEY
- Postcode district: OX29
- Police: Thames Valley
- Fire: Oxfordshire
- Ambulance: South Central
- UK Parliament: Oxford West and Abingdon

Swinford in the English county of Oxfordshire is a hamlet in the civil parish of Cumnor. It lies on the road between Eynsham and Farmoor (B4044) on the south bank of the River Thames. The grade II* listed Swinford Toll Bridge carrying the B4044 crosses the River Thames here. In 1974 it was transferred from Berkshire to the county of Oxfordshire.

== See also ==
- Pinkhill Lock
- Swinford Toll Bridge
