= Cumnor =

Village west of Oxford, England

Coordinates: 51.735°N 1.332°W

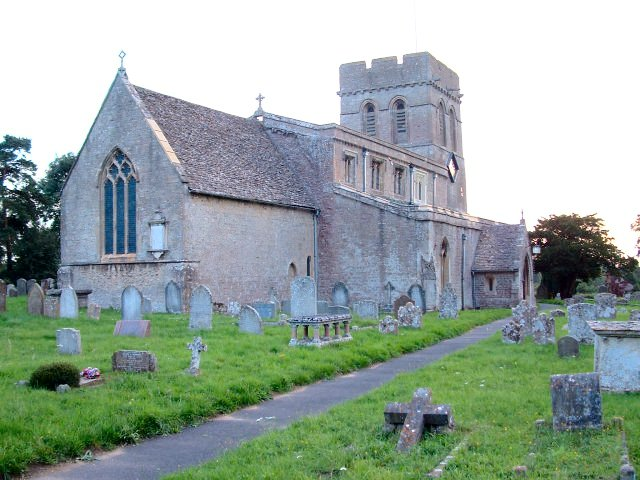
- St. Michael's parish church

- Location within Oxfordshire
- Population: 6,652 (2021 Census)
- OS grid reference: SP4604
- Civil parish: Cumnor
- District: Vale of White Horse
- Shire county: Oxfordshire
- Region: South East
- Country: England
- Sovereign state: United Kingdom
- Post town: Oxford
- Postcode district: OX2
- Dialling code: 01865
- Police: Thames Valley
- Fire: Oxfordshire
- Ambulance: South Central
- UK Parliament: Oxford West and Abingdon
- Website: Cumnor Parish Council

Cumnor is a village and civil parish 3½ miles (5.6 km) west of the centre of Oxford, England. The village is about 2 miles (3.2 km) south-west of Botley and its centre is west of the A420 road to Swindon. The parish includes Cumnor Hill (a ribbon development between Cumnor village and Botley), Chawley (at the top of Cumnor Hill), the Dean Court area on the edge of Botley and the outlying settlements of Chilswell, Farmoor, Filchampstead and Swinford. It was within Berkshire until the 1974 local government boundary changes transferred it to Oxfordshire. The 2021 Census recorded the parish population as 6,652.

== Amenities ==
Cumnor has two public houses, the Vine and the Bear and Ragged Staff. It has a hairdresser, a sub-post office and greengrocer and a complementary health clinic. The newsagent closed in 2018 and the butchers in January, 2025. It has two churches: the Church of England parish church of St Michael in the centre of the village and Cumnor United Reformed Church in Leys Road. The village has well established football and cricket clubs, both located in Appleton Road.

Cumnor Primary School, located in the centre of the village has produced many notable pupils. The Oxford School of Music is in Cumnor Hill. Notable residents in October 2008 included novelist Philip Pullman and celebrity chef Sophie Grigson. The composer and conductor Christopher Whelen lived in Cumnor for several years until his death in 1993.

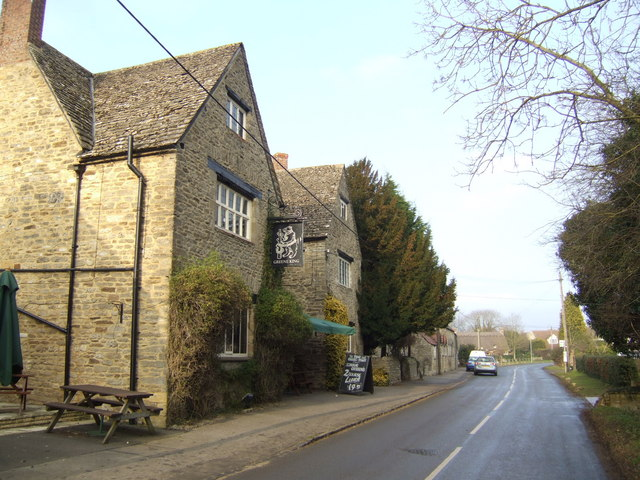
The Bear and Ragged Staff public house.

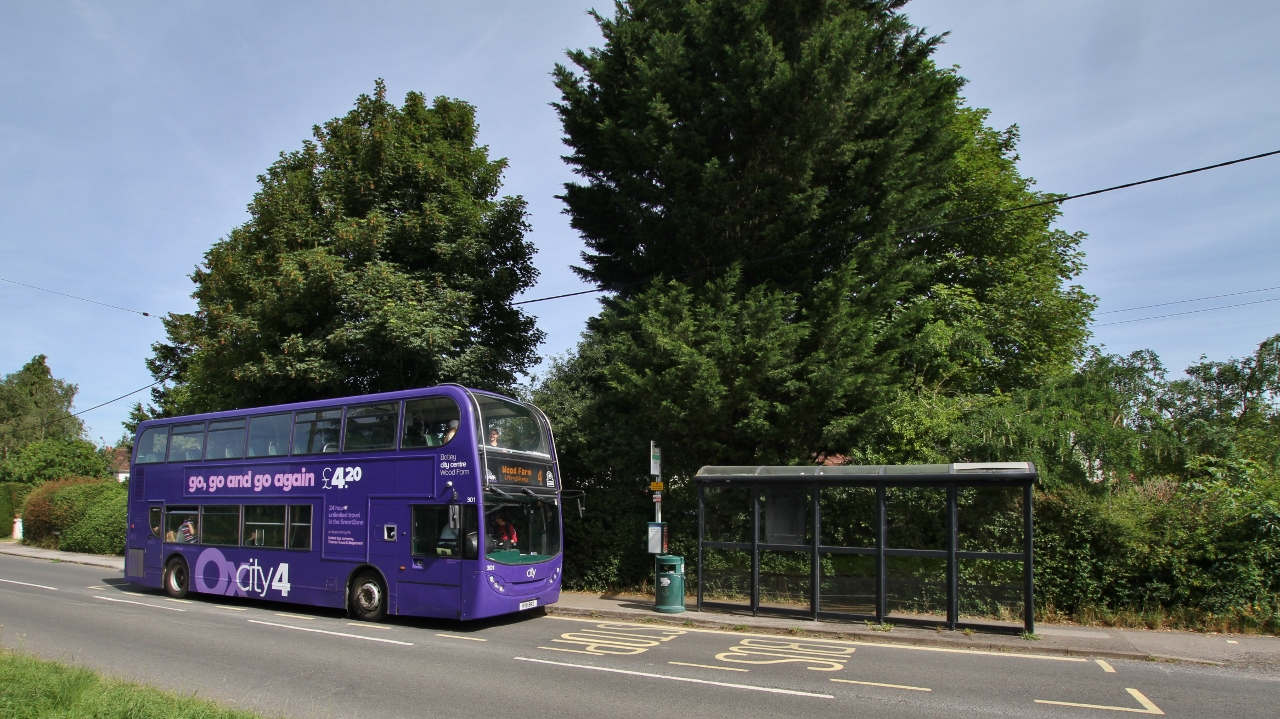
An Oxford Bus Company bus in Oxford Road, Cumnor

== Public transport ==
Cumnor is served by Oxford Bus Company routes 44 and 63 to Abingdon, Oxford and Southmoor and Stagecoach in Oxfordshire route S9 to Oxford and Wantage.

== Rivers and streams ==
Cumnor parish adjoins the River Thames on its south bank near Bablock Hythe. The centre of Cumnor village lies 1.5 miles to the east. The source of the Osse Stream is a pond in Cumnor.

== History ==
The earliest known record of Cumnor appears in a Saxon charter of 931 AD as Cumanoran. The Domesday Book of 1086 terms it Comenore. Other medieval spellings include Colmonora and Colmanora. The name derives from Old English for "Cuma's hill-slope". However, a Benedictine called Cumma was Abbot of Abingdon about 730 AD. The parish in the Middle Ages was among the largest in Berkshire. It included Wytham, Seacourt, North Hinksey, South Hinksey and Wootton and was one of several in the Hundred of Hormer. In 1560 Cumnor Place saw the accidental death and rumoured suicide or murder of Amy Robsart, ailing wife of Lord Robert Dudley. The house was pulled down in 1810, because, it was said, her ghost gave locals trouble. In reality the house had become decrepit.

Cumnor includes some houses by Clough Williams-Ellis, the architect noted for his designs for Portmeirion. His Cumnor houses are some of his earliest commissions, including his first commission, Larkbeare (1903–04, completed 1907) on Cumnor Hill, designed whilst he was still a student at the Architectural Association School of Architecture. The other examples are Cutts End House (1911, Appleton Road), Hurstcote (1922, Appleton Road), and Larkbeare Cottage (1910, Cumnor Hill; originally a gardener's cottage associated with Larkbeare). He also designed Cumnor Rise Hospital at a similar time to Larkbeare (designed 1903–1904, completed 1907) but this was demolished in the 1990s. The Kimmeridge Clay Formation outcrops near Cumnor. The dinosaur Cumnoria prestwichii was discovered near Cumnor before 1879 and was named by Harry Govier Seeley in 1888. Thomas Hardy based Lumsdon on Cumnor in his novel Jude the Obscure.

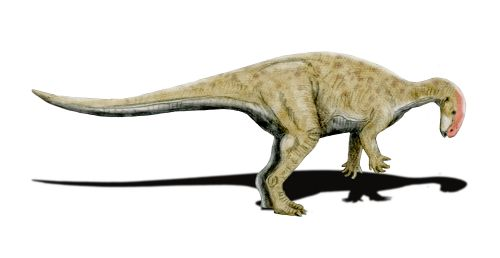
Cumnoria prestwichii was discovered near Cumnor

== See also ==
- Henry Brooke, Baron Brooke of Cumnor (1903–84)
- Ruth Deech, Baroness Deech of Cumnor (born 1943)
- Cumnor Hurst

== Sources and further reading ==
- Ditchfield, PH; Page, William, eds. (1924). "Cumnor". A History of the County of Berkshire. Victoria County History. Vol. IV. assisted by John Hautenville Cope. London: The St Katherine Press. pp. 398–405.
- Ekwall, Eilert (1960) [1936]. Concise Oxford Dictionary of English Place-Names (4th ed.). Oxford: Oxford University Press. Cumnor. ISBN 0198691033.
- Pevsner, Nikolaus (1966). Berkshire. The Buildings of England. Harmondsworth: Penguin Books. pp. 124–126.
