= Caldecott, Oxfordshire =

Suburb of Abingdon, Oxfordshire, England

Coordinates: 51.66°N 01.29°W

Caldecott
- Location within Oxfordshire
- OS grid reference: SU4996
- Shire county: Oxfordshire
- Region: South East
- Country: England
- Sovereign state: United Kingdom
- Post town: ABINGDON
- Postcode district: OX14
- Dialling code: 01235
- Police: Thames Valley
- Fire: Oxfordshire
- Ambulance: South Central

Caldecott is a suburb of Abingdon in Oxfordshire, England. Caldecott was formerly part of Sutton Wick but is now part of Abingdon.
