= Hurst Hill, Oxfordshire =

Hill in Oxfordshire, England

Coordinates: 51°44′00″N 1°18′40″W

Hurst Hill
- Site of Special Scientific Interest
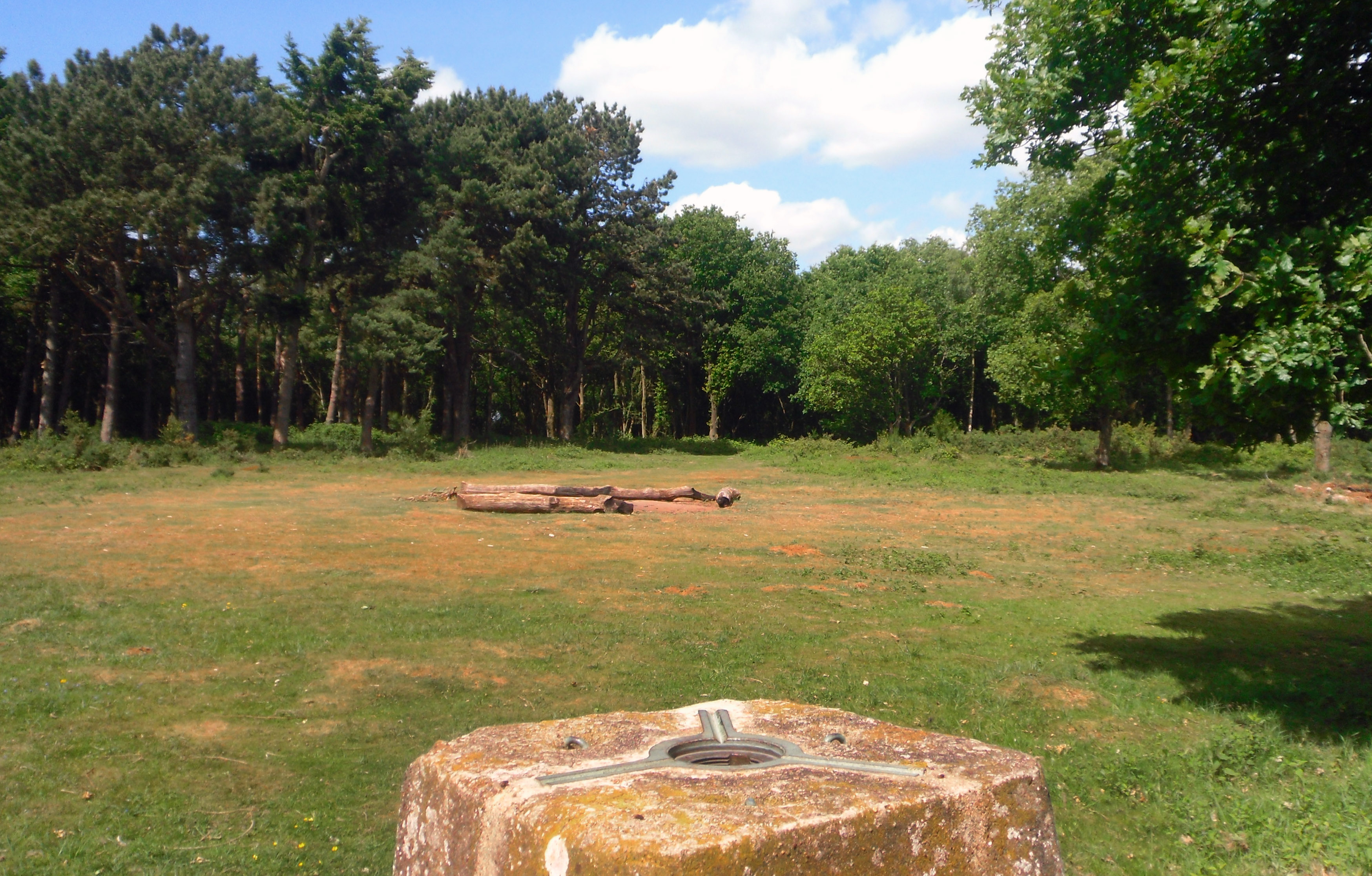
- Location of Hurst Hill.
- Area of search: Oxfordshire
- Grid reference: SP 476 041
- Interest: Biological; Geological
- Area: 20.6 hectares (51 acres)
- Notification date: 1986
- Location map: Magic Map

Hurst Hill or Cumnor Hurst is a 20.6-hectare (51-acre) biological and geological Site of Special Scientific Interest west of Oxford in Oxfordshire. It is a Geological Conservation Review site.

The site is owned by All Souls College, Oxford, and its mosses and liverworts have been monitored for more than fifty years. The hill is also important geologically. In 1879 a fossil of a Camptosaurus prestwichii, a large herbivorous dinosaur dating to the Upper Jurassic 153 million years ago, was found on the site. The fossil belongs to a typically North African genus, and provides evidence of a land bridge across the proto-Atlantic in the Late Jurassic.

The hill is mentioned in Matthew Arnold's poem The Scholar Gipsy.
