= Cumnor Hill =

Hill in Oxfordshire, England

Coordinates: 51°44′08″N 01°19′17″W

Cumnor Hill is a hill in the civil parish of Cumnor, to the west of (but not within) the city of Oxford, in the English county of Oxfordshire. In 1974 it was transferred from Berkshire. It is also the name of the ribbon development between the original Cumnor village and Botley, outside the ring road on the outskirts of Oxford.

The road up Cumnor Hill was the original route of the A420 between Oxford and Swindon, until the Cumnor Hill by-pass was built in the 1970s. The road is now unclassified.

At the top of Cumnor Hill is the hamlet of Chawley, where the Kimmeridge Clay is close to the surface. There were brickworks there until 1937.
