= Fulscot =

Hamlet in Oxfordshire, England

Coordinates: 51.596°N 1.214°W

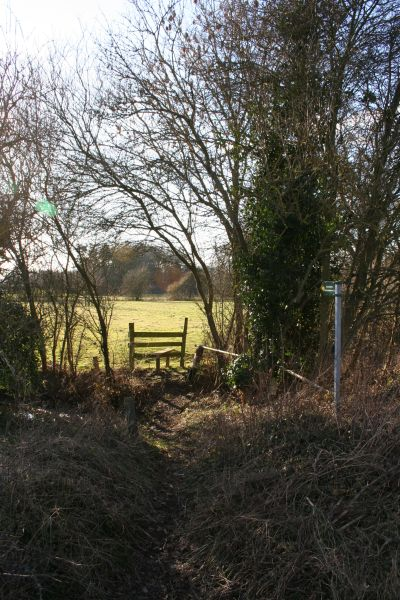
- Footpath to the manor

- Location within Oxfordshire
- OS grid reference: SU5488
- Civil parish: South Moreton
- District: South Oxfordshire
- Shire county: Oxfordshire
- Region: South East
- Country: England
- Sovereign state: United Kingdom
- Post town: Didcot
- Postcode district: OX11
- Dialling code: 01235
- Police: Thames Valley
- Fire: Oxfordshire
- Ambulance: South Central
- UK Parliament: Wantage
- Website: Welcome to the South Moreton website

Fulscot is a hamlet in South Moreton civil parish in South Oxfordshire, about 0.5 miles (800 m) west of the village.

Follescote is recorded in the Domesday Book of 1086 as a settlement in Berkshire with 9 households. The village was depopulated following enclosure for pasture or improved arable land between the fifteenth and seventeenth centuries and the buildings deteriorated. There is now solely a modern building, situated on the site of the former manor house, where traces of a moat still survive. Fulscot otherwise now consists of a few cottages on the road from South Moreton to the neighbouring town of Didcot.

In 1974 it was transferred from Berkshire to Oxfordshire.
