= Bow, Oxfordshire =

Hamlet in England

Coordinates: 51.64°N 01.50°W

Bow
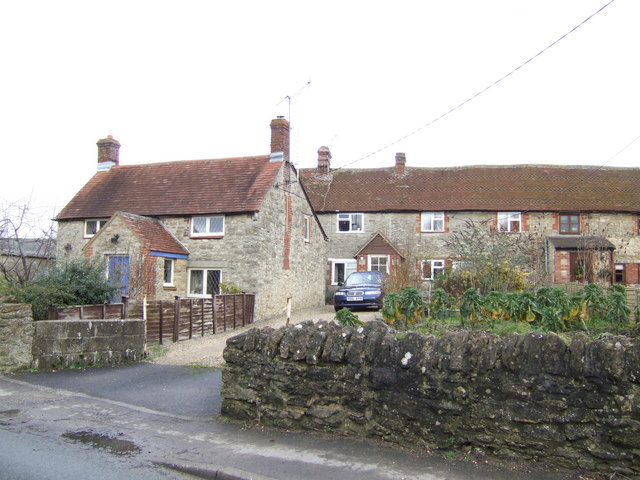
- Cottages at Bow

- Location within Oxfordshire
- OS grid reference: SU3494
- Civil parish: Stanford in the Vale
- District: Vale of White Horse
- Shire county: Oxfordshire
- Region: South East
- Country: England
- Sovereign state: United Kingdom
- Post town: Faringdon
- Postcode district: SN7
- Dialling code: 01367
- Police: Thames Valley
- Fire: Oxfordshire
- Ambulance: South Central
- UK Parliament: Didcot and Wantage
- Website: Stanford in the Vale

Bow is a hamlet contiguous with Stanford in the Vale in Oxfordshire, England.

It lies 21 kilometres (13 mi) southwest of Oxford and 97 kilometres (60 mi) west of London.
