= Farmoor =

Village in Oxfordshire, England

Coordinates: 51°45′37″N 1°21′09″W

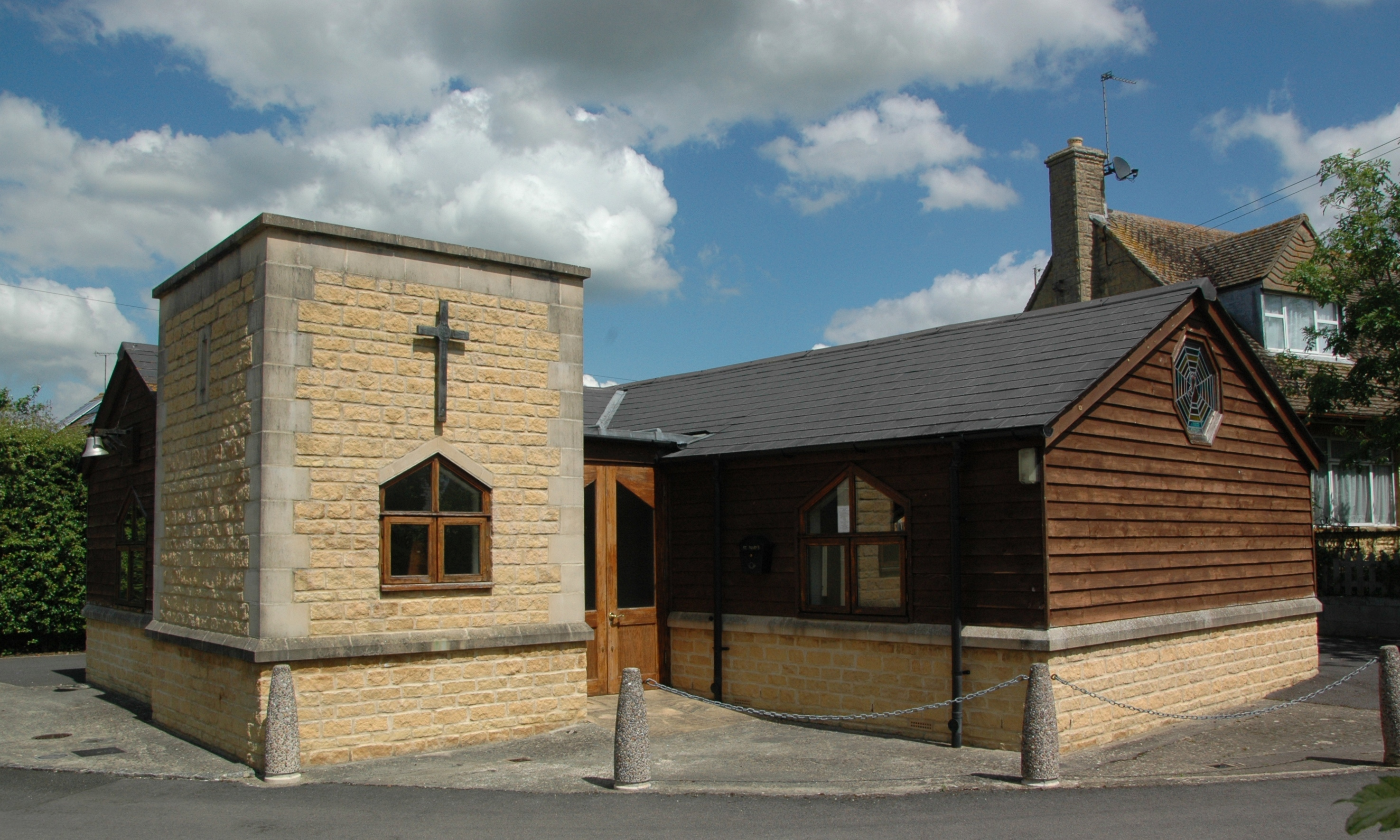
- St Mary's parish church

- Location within Oxfordshire
- OS grid reference: SP4507
- Civil parish: Cumnor
- District: Vale of White Horse
- Shire county: Oxfordshire
- Region: South East
- Country: England
- Sovereign state: United Kingdom
- Post town: Oxford
- Postcode district: OX2
- Dialling code: 01865
- Police: Thames Valley
- Fire: Oxfordshire
- Ambulance: South Central
- UK Parliament: Oxford West and Abingdon

Farmoor is a village 3.5 miles (5.6 km) west of the centre of Oxford, England. The village was part of Berkshire until the 1974 local government boundary changes transferred it to Oxfordshire. The village is 550 yards (500 m) from Pinkhill Lock on the River Thames. Farmoor has a village shop, filling station and a small business park called Farmoor Court. Historically the Farmoor area was called the tything of Stroud. Farmoor Common was an open field within the tything. It is now submerged under the reservoir. The village was developed in the early decades of the 20th century and took its name from the Common.

Farmoor is part of the parish of Cumnor, and until the 20th century parishioners worshipped 2 miles (3 km) away at the Church of England parish church of Saint Michael, Cumnor. There is now the church of Saint Mary, Farmoor that was built as a chapel of ease. Farmoor Reservoir was built in 1967 and extended in 1976. It has a number of wetland nature areas. BBC Television used Oaken Holt Rest Home in Eynsham Road, Farmoor, as a location for the 1990s sitcom Waiting for God.
