= Chilton, Oxfordshire =

Village and civil parish in Oxfordshire, England

Coordinates: 51.568°N 1.294°W

Chilton
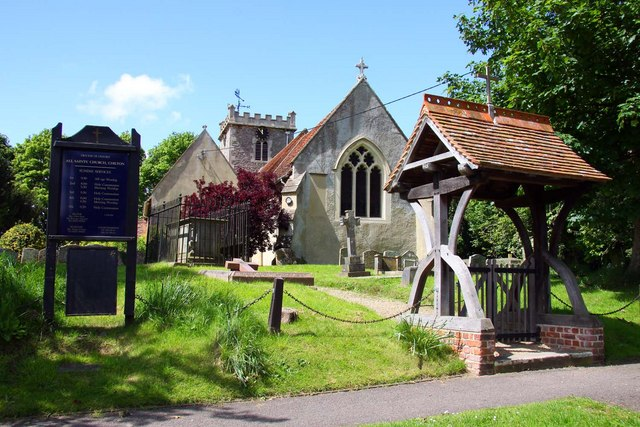
- All Saints' Church

- Location within Oxfordshire
- Population: 1,720 (2021 Census)
- OS grid reference: SU4985
- Civil parish: Chilton
- District: Vale of White Horse
- Shire county: Oxfordshire
- Region: South East
- Country: England
- Sovereign state: United Kingdom
- Post town: Didcot
- Postcode district: OX11
- Dialling code: 01235
- Police: Thames Valley
- Fire: Oxfordshire
- Ambulance: South Central
- UK Parliament: Didcot and Wantage
- Website: Chilton Parish Council

Chilton is a village and civil parish in the Vale of White Horse district of Oxfordshire, England, about 3 1/2 miles (6 km) southwest of Didcot. The parish was historically part of Berkshire until the 1974 local government reorganisation transferred it to Oxfordshire.

Archaeological evidence from the parish includes a Middle Iron Age settlement and a later Roman villa. Racehorse training became an important local industry during the 19th and 20th centuries, with several training yards established around the village. Much of RAF Harwell was constructed within Chilton parish during the 1930s and played an important role in Allied airborne operations during the Second World War. After the war, the former airfield became the Atomic Energy Research Establishment and subsequently formed part of the present Harwell Science and Innovation Campus.

The A34 passes through the parish, separating the historic village to the east from the newer Chilton Field development to the west. The 2021 Census recorded a population of 1,720, compared with 894 in 2011.

== Geography ==
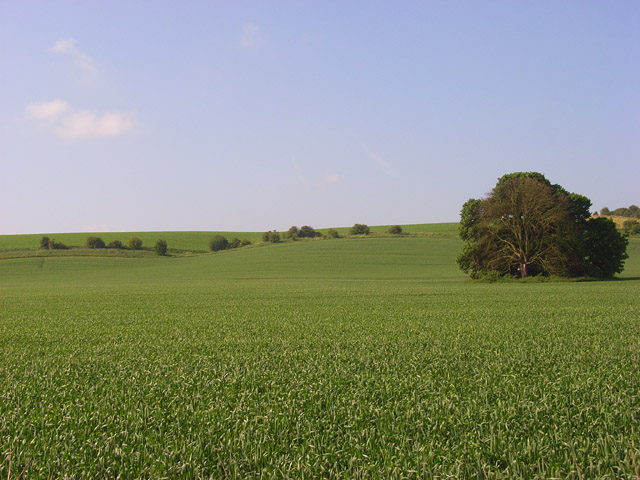
Farmland on the Chilton Downs. The hedgerow follows part of Grim's Ditch.

Chilton is one of a series of spring-line villages at the northern edge of the North Wessex Downs, immediately below the ancient Ridgeway. The civil parish lies within the North Wessex Downs National Landscape.

A section of Grim's Ditch forms part of the southern boundary of the parish, and the Ridgeway National Trail passes to the south of the village. The historic settlement occupies a sheltered position below the downs, while much of the surrounding land is agricultural.

The village has two principal residential areas. The older village lies predominantly east of the A34, while the Chilton Field development lies to the west.

== History ==
=== Prehistory and Roman period ===
A notable early archaeological discovery was made on nearby Hagbourne Hill in 1803, when prehistoric metal objects were found in several pits. The surviving finds held by the British Museum include Iron Age horse bits, three terrets, a ring-headed pin and coins, together with Bronze Age pins, spearheads and possibly part of a palstave axe. The museum notes that the mixed dating of the objects may indicate two separate hoards or repeated deposition rather than a single assemblage. The 19th-century antiquary William Hewett described the discovery site as about half a mile from Chilton, close to the route then locally known as the Ickleton Way.

Archaeological evidence indicates occupation of the Chilton area long before the development of the present village. Excavations at Chilton Fields before residential development revealed evidence of a Middle Iron Age settlement, including a roundhouse, followed by several phases of Romano-British occupation.

During the Roman period a stone-footed building on the site was enlarged and developed into a modest Roman villa. Its principal building included a central hall measuring about 15 metres (49 ft) by 8.5 metres (28 ft), with smaller adjoining rooms. A separate two-room building had an arched stokehole and a covered hypocaust for underfloor heating, and fragments of painted wall plaster were also recovered.

=== Medieval and early modern history ===
Chilton is recorded in the Domesday Book of 1086.

The Latton family was associated with the manor of Chilton during the late medieval and Tudor periods. John Latton, who represented Oxford in Parliament in 1529 and later served as treasurer and governor of the Inner Temple, was described as "of Chilton". He died in 1548 and was commemorated by a monumental brass at Blewbury.

Following the Second Battle of Newbury in 1644, Parliamentarian cavalry under William Waller, Oliver Cromwell and Arthur Haselrig pursued the retreating Royalists towards Oxford. Walter Money's history of the campaign records that a force of about 6,000 cavalry reached Blewbury and was subsequently quartered in Blewbury, Hagbourne, Chilton, Harwell and neighbouring villages. The cavalry under Cromwell later lay overnight on Chilton Plain before moving to Compton. Hewett's 1844 account likewise recorded Parliamentarian troops being quartered at Chilton for several days and Royalist forces occupying Chilton Plain shortly afterwards.

The village's neighbourhood plan attributes damage to the tower of All Saints' Church to Parliamentarian troops pursuing the retreating Royalists. Hewett, writing before the Victorian rebuilding of the tower, described it as partially destroyed and surmounted by a wooden structure containing four bells, and considered the damage to have occurred during the Civil Wars. The wooden belfry was later superseded by the present stone tower in the 19th century.

A local history published by Chilton Parish Council records that five houses were destroyed by fire in 1713 and that a royal charitable brief was issued to raise money for those affected. Evidence that the appeal was circulated nationally survives in parish records elsewhere in England: a published transcription of records from Aughton, Lancashire, records a "Withridge and Chilton" fire brief being read there on 21 March 1713/14, with combined losses of £1,116.

=== Horse racing ===
Racehorse training has a long association with Chilton and the surrounding Berkshire Downs. In the 18th century William, Duke of Cumberland, the second son of George II, was tenant of a mansion at Kate's Gore on Gore Hill, which was used as an important racehorse-training establishment. Kate's Gore lay close to the historic Chilton–East Ilsley parish boundary, along which part of Grim's Ditch ran.

The freely draining chalk turf of the downs was well suited to galloping horses. During the 19th and 20th centuries racehorse training became a significant industry in Chilton, providing employment within the village. An 1899 directory noted simply that "race horses are trained here", while later directories listed several professional trainers in the village.

Another training establishment operated at Lime Tree House in the village. Jack Waugh, who later established the Downs House yard, served part of his apprenticeship there under his uncle Len Cundell.

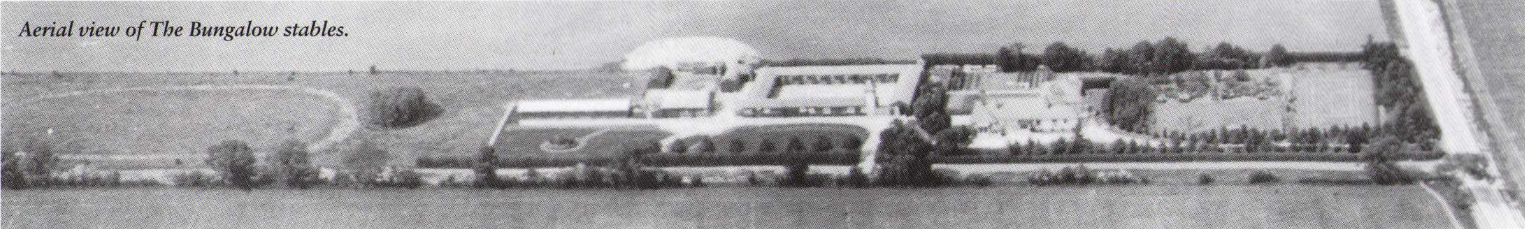
Aerial view of the Bungalow racehorse-training stables at Chilton, shortly before the site was acquired for the construction of RAF Harwell. Thorningdown Road runs alongside the site.

One of the principal establishments was the Bungalow Stables, established in about 1905 alongside Thorningdown Road. It was reportedly named after its house, said to have been the first bungalow built in Chilton. The establishment included accommodation for about 36 horses, a tennis court and an oval exercise track.

Len Cundell moved his training operation from Lime Tree House to the Bungalow Stables in the latter part of 1923. His most successful period there came in 1930 and 1931 with horses including Oak Ridge and Noble Star. In 1931 Noble Star won the Ascot Stakes, the Goodwood Stakes at Goodwood Racecourse and the Cesarewitch at Newmarket Racecourse. A local history published in 2000 recorded that the horse earned £5,655 in prize money that year and that many Chilton residents also profited from bets placed on him.

In 1935 the Air Ministry compulsorily purchased the Bungalow Stables and surrounding land for £11,650 as part of the site required for construction of RAF Harwell. Cundell subsequently transferred his training operation to Aston Tirrold.

The construction of RAF Harwell did not end racehorse training elsewhere in Chilton. Downs House on Lower Road, built in the early 1930s, was originally associated with its own racing stables. Jack Waugh, who had previously worked with Len Cundell, established a substantial training operation there. During the Second World War his yard accommodated about 40 horses, and its gallops on the surrounding downs were regarded as among the finest in the country. Waugh retired in 1964 after training 870 winners. The future Grand National-winning trainer Gordon W. Richards served part of his apprenticeship at Downs House under Waugh.

Downs House remained a racehorse-training yard after Waugh's retirement. In the 1970s it was occupied by trainer Calverley "Verly" Bewicke, who had trained Kerstin to win the 1958 Cheltenham Gold Cup. Bewicke was subsequently followed at Downs House by trainer James Bethell, who trained Flat horses there before later moving his stable to Middleham, North Yorkshire. The succession of training yards at Lime Tree House, the Bungalow Stables and Downs House meant that professional racehorse training remained a feature of Chilton for much of the 20th century.

=== RAF Harwell ===
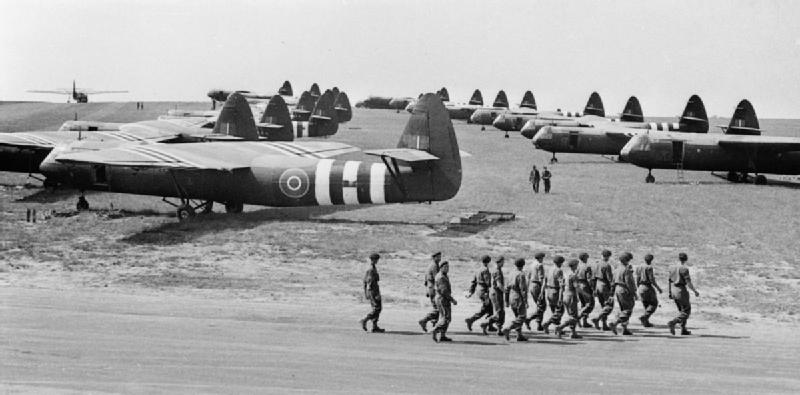
Horsa gliders and troops of the 6th Airborne Division at RAF Harwell before D-Day

RAF Harwell was constructed on land to the north-west of Chilton as part of the expansion of the Royal Air Force during the mid-1930s. Construction began in 1935 and the station opened in February 1937. Despite its name, the majority of the airfield lay within Chilton parish, with about a third in East Hendred and the smallest portion in Harwell.

Between 1938 and 1940 the airfield was used to develop the experimental Royal Aircraft Establishment Mark III Catapult, intended to accelerate heavily laden bomber aircraft to flying speed over a short distance. The installation incorporated a rotating turntable, two 82-metre (269 ft) concrete tracks and an underground pneumatic launching mechanism. Technical problems led to the project being abandoned without an aircraft ever being launched from it. Much of the structure was subsequently buried, and its surviving remains were excavated and recorded by archaeologists in 2023 during redevelopment of the former airfield.

The station was attacked several times by the Luftwaffe during 1940. On 16 August a German aircraft bombed and strafed the airfield, destroying three Vickers Wellington bombers and two petrol bowsers and killing two people. Further attacks followed on 19 and 26 August, with the latter killing six people and injuring ten civilian workers near the station's bomb dump.

In March 1944 Harwell became a base for No. 38 Group RAF and airborne forces preparing for the Normandy landings. On the night of 5 June 1944 the first pathfinder aircraft departed Harwell shortly after 23:00 carrying men of the 22nd Independent Parachute Company to mark landing and drop zones for the 6th Airborne Division. During Operation Tonga, aircraft and Airspeed Horsa gliders operating from Harwell subsequently transported airborne troops, headquarters personnel, vehicles, guns and equipment to Normandy. Harwell was used again on 6 June for Operation Mallard, the reinforcement of British airborne forces in Normandy.

A memorial at the end of one of the former runways commemorates the aircraft of No. 38 Group and the troops of the 6th Airborne Division who departed Harwell on the night of 5 June. The memorial, which lies within Chilton parish, was unveiled in 1955 and remains the site of an annual D-Day commemoration.

RAF Harwell closed at the end of 1945 and the site was transferred to the Ministry of Supply on 1 January 1946 for the establishment of the Atomic Energy Research Establishment. The former airfield subsequently became part of the present Harwell Science and Innovation Campus.

=== Railway ===
The Didcot, Newbury and Southampton Railway passed immediately east of Chilton through a deep cutting. The Didcot–Newbury section opened in 1882 and was operated by the Great Western Railway. The nearest station to Chilton was Upton and Blewbury, to the north of the village.

Excavation of the railway cutting exposed a distinctive limestone bed which became known as the Chilton Stone. The term was first used by geologist A. J. Jukes-Browne in 1889, and the railway cutting east of Chilton was designated its type section. The bed is about 0.6 metres (2.0 ft) thick at the site and consists of a brownish-grey, gritty limestone containing phosphatic nodules.

Later British Geological Survey work recorded surviving exposures in the disused railway cutting between Chilton and Upton, while another section east of the village had been buried by landfill.

The route was doubled during the Second World War to accommodate increased military traffic. Passenger services between Didcot and Newbury ended in 1962, and the railway subsequently closed completely. Parts of the former cutting and associated structures survive east of the village, although sections of the cutting have been infilled.

=== Atomic research ===
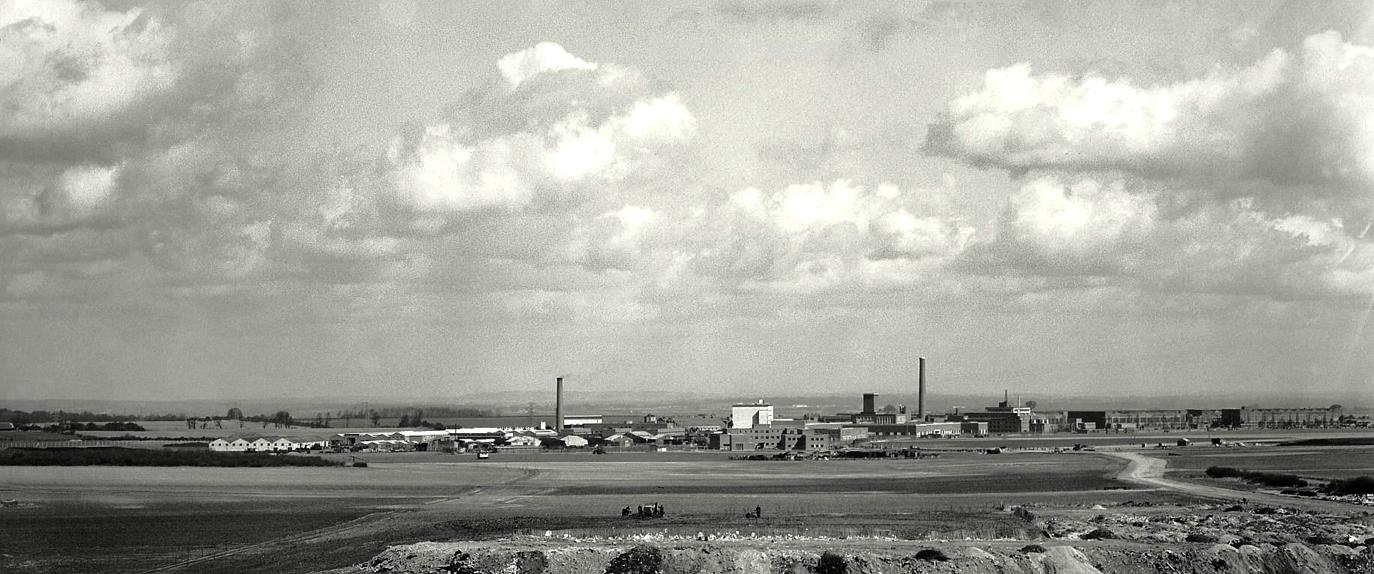
The Harwell research site in 1957, during the early years of the Atomic Energy Research Establishment.

After the Second World War, the former airfield became the Atomic Energy Research Establishment (AERE). Harwell developed into one of the principal centres of the early British nuclear research programme. In 1947 the Graphite Low Energy Experimental Pile (GLEEP) at Harwell became the first nuclear reactor to operate in Western Europe.

The growth of AERE led to the construction of housing on the Chilton side of the site. This included 100 prefabricated houses and 12 permanent houses on Severn Road. The prefabricated houses were demolished during the 1990s, and their former site subsequently formed part of the Chilton Field development.

A notable aviation incident occurred on the former airfield on 22 April 1957, when a two-seat United States Air Force T-33 Shooting Star became lost in poor weather after suffering compass and instrument failure while flying from Kent to Bournemouth. Running short of fuel, its crew mistook the former Harwell airfield for RAF Abingdon and landed along what is now Fermi Avenue, bursting two tyres while braking before reaching Newbury Road.

An attempt was subsequently made to fly the aircraft out using rocket-assisted take-off equipment. The attempt failed and the aircraft passed through security fencing close to the GLEEP reactor, losing its landing gear before coming to rest near a construction site. Nobody was injured, and the aircraft was later recovered by the United States Air Force.

=== Roads and modern development ===
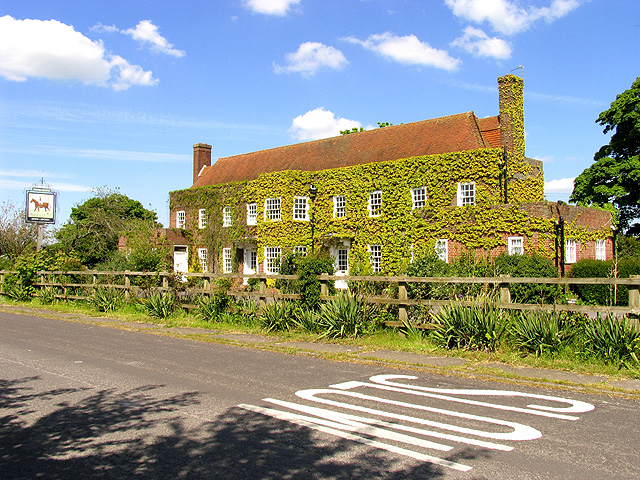
The former Horse and Jockey at Chilton. The public house and the adjacent smithy were later demolished.

Chilton Pond, beside the old Oxford–Newbury road, was historically an important point on the regional road network. The turnpike road from Andover through Newbury, authorised in 1766, terminated at Chilton Pond, where it met the turnpike road running south from Oxford and Abingdon. The route subsequently formed part of the A34.

The pond also served travellers using the road. The neighbouring Pond Cottages stood close to a smithy and an inn, where stagecoach horses could be watered, changed and attended to. The inn was recorded as the Horse and Groom in 1851 and was rebuilt as the Horse and Jockey in 1938. The Horse and Jockey later ceased operating as a public house and both it and the neighbouring smithy were eventually demolished. Planning permission for residential redevelopment of the former pub site was granted in 2005.

Evidence of Chilton's blacksmithing tradition survives elsewhere in the village in the metal railings at Layton Cottage, which were made by the village blacksmith.

The historic village developed around a loop connecting two points on the old Oxford–Newbury road. White Road and Townsend formed the northern connection, while Lower Road formed the southern connection. The Oxford–Newbury road later became part of the A34.

When the A34 trunk road was upgraded and realigned in the 1970s, the new dual carriageway bypassed the historic village and divided it from land to the west. Part of the former main-road alignment survives as Newbury Road and the A4185.

A major reconstruction of the Chilton interchange began in 2015, adding a new southbound exit from the A34 and a new northbound entry to it, together with two new roundabouts and associated road improvements. The scheme was intended to improve access between the trunk road, Chilton and the Harwell Science and Innovation Campus, and the completed interchange opened on 10 November 2016.

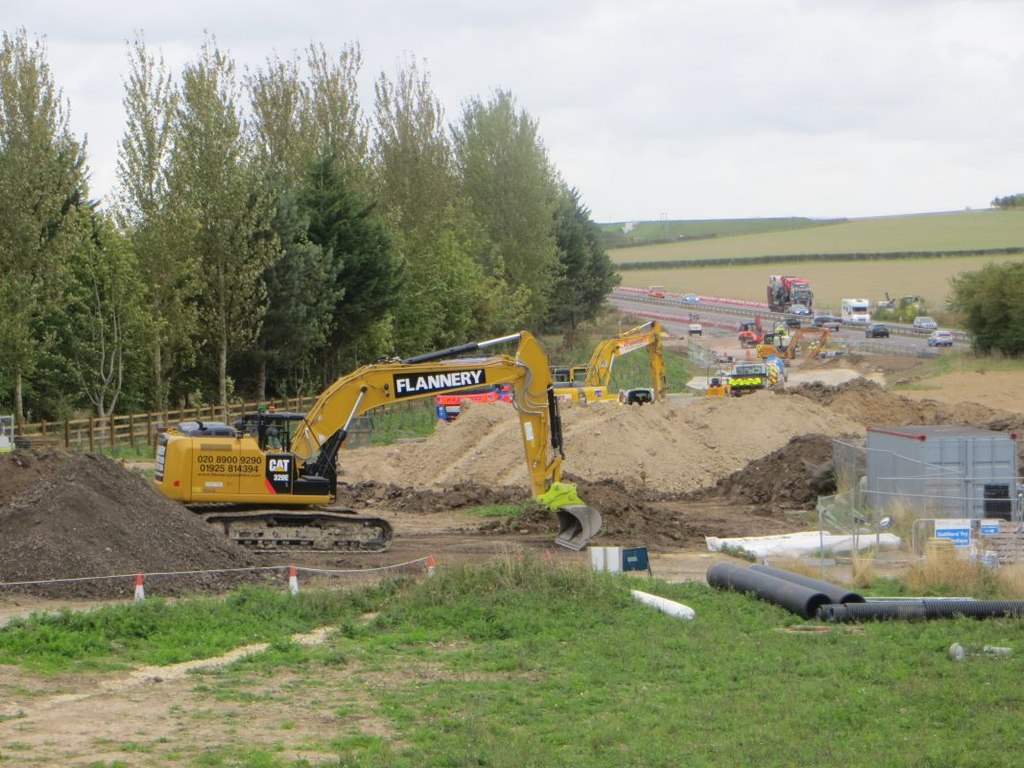
Site clearance during construction of the northbound side of the Chilton interchange on the A34.

A 14.9-hectare (37-acre) area at Chilton Field had historically been used for waste storage during both the wartime RAF period and the post-war nuclear research period. The United Kingdom Atomic Energy Authority carried out a two-year remediation project between 2000 and 2002, returning the site to a condition suitable for future use.

The site was subsequently sold for residential development, with planning consent for 275 homes together with sports facilities and green open space.

==== Housing development ====
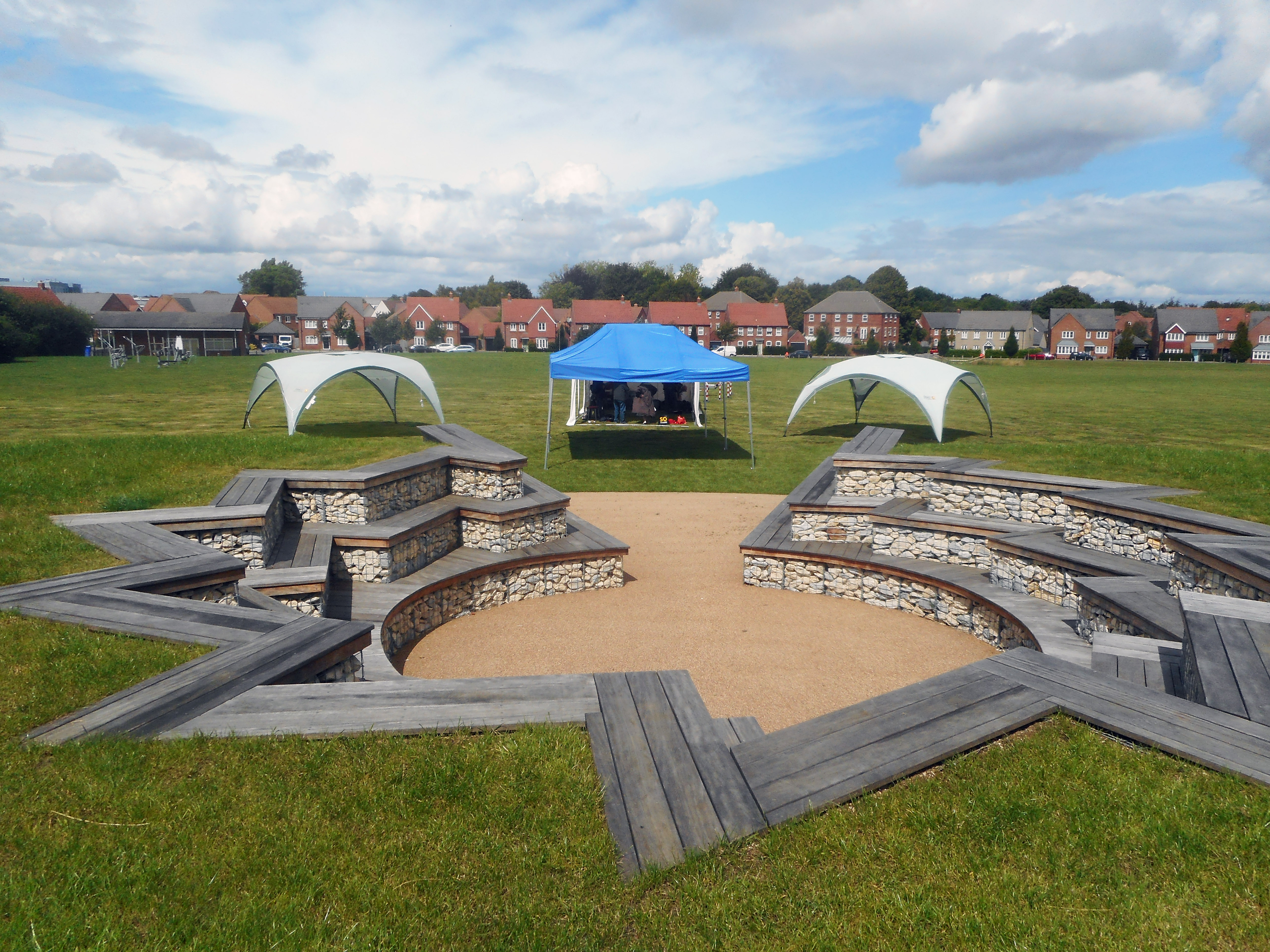
The recreation area at Chilton Field, with housing from the modern development in the background.

Chilton expanded substantially during the second half of the 20th century and early 21st century. The village's neighbourhood plan records a series of residential developments, including:

- South Row – council and private housing developed during the 1930s; some of the private housing was later demolished and redeveloped.
- Elderfield Crescent – 22 council houses, built in 1949.
- The Lane – bungalow development during the 1960s.
- Manor Close – 11 detached houses, developed from 1966.
- Crafts End – 71 bungalows, detached and semi-detached houses, built in 1967.
- Latton Close – 20 detached houses, built in 1973 on the site of two historic barns.
- Hill Piece – 24 terraced houses and six flats, developed as council housing during the 1970s.
- Thorningdown – seven detached houses, built in 1982.
- The Orchids – 21 detached and terraced houses, built in 1987.
- Limetrees – 30 detached houses, built in 1991.
- The Paddock – 11 detached houses, built in 1996.
- The Gallops – 11 linked dwellings, built in 2007.
- Chilton Field – 275 detached, semi-detached and terraced homes, including affordable housing and a community room, developed principally between 2010 and 2014.
- Pegasus Close – 18 detached and terraced homes, completed in 2019; the development uses air-source heat pumps for space and water heating.

The developments transformed the size of the village. The neighbourhood plan recorded that eight developments constructed between 1961 and 1991 alone provided 185 homes, while the later Chilton Field development almost doubled Chilton's population.

== Church and historic buildings ==
The Church of England parish church of All Saints stands on Church Hill and is a Grade II listed building. Its nave dates from the 12th century, the south aisle from the 13th century and the chancel from the 14th century. The present stone tower is Victorian.

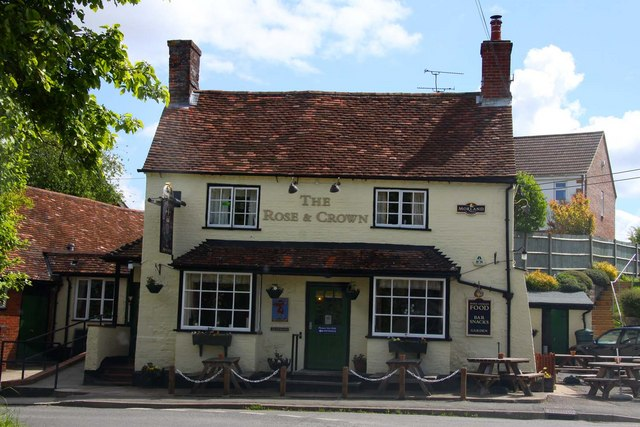
The pub when it was known as the Rose and Crown; it was renamed the Crown at Chilton in 2025.

The highest-graded listed building in the village is Place Farm House in The Lane, a Grade II* listed farmhouse of 15th- and 16th-century origin.

The house was historically known as Latton's Place and was associated with the Latton family. In 1844 Hewett described a large wainscoted room containing carved heraldic decoration, including the quartered arms of the Lattons, and three circular panes of painted glass depicting religious subjects which he considered to pre-date the Reformation. Kelly's Directory recorded that until around 1878 the house still surrounded three sides of a small courtyard and contained two oak-panelled rooms, one retaining a nearly complete carved cornice bearing the quartered Latton arms. The directory stated that the woodwork, together with fragments of stained glass, was subsequently sold by the landlord to a local antiques dealer in Abingdon for £16 in order to pay for repairs.

Other Grade II listed buildings or groups include Chilton House in Townsend, The Goddards on Church Hill, East, Middle and West Houses, Dene Hollow and Dene Lodge, the Malt House on Main Street, and 1 and 2 The Green. A number of further buildings, including the Crown at Chilton public house (formerly the Rose and Crown), Downs House and the former village school, are identified in the neighbourhood plan as non-designated heritage assets.

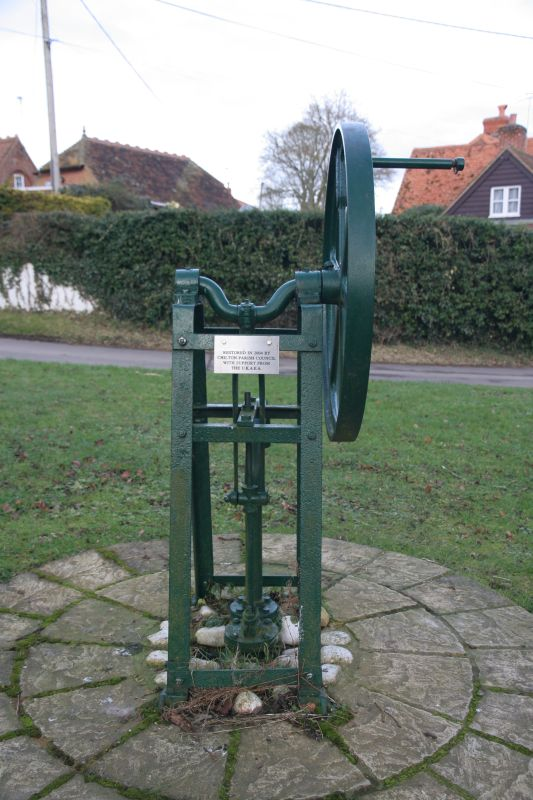
The historic village pump on the green in Chilton.

The small village green at the junction of Church Hill, Main Street, The Lane and Crafts End contains Chilton's historic village pump. The pump was installed in the early 20th century during a particularly dry summer when the village's wells ran dry; mains water did not reach Chilton until after the Second World War. The pump was later taken out of use following contamination of the local aquifer associated with the nearby Harwell site.

== Education ==
The first recorded school in Chilton was an 18th-century charity school in the Malt House on Main Street. A purpose-built school was opened on Church Hill in 1870 with accommodation for 60 children; the building is now known as Cross House.

The expansion of the nearby Atomic Energy Research Establishment led to the opening of a larger school in 1950. Its four prefabricated classrooms accommodated about 90 pupils from both the village and the new AERE housing.

A new Chilton Primary School opened in 2002 with capacity for 130 children. Following the construction of Chilton Field, three additional classrooms were opened in 2018 to accommodate the increased village population.

== Harwell Campus ==
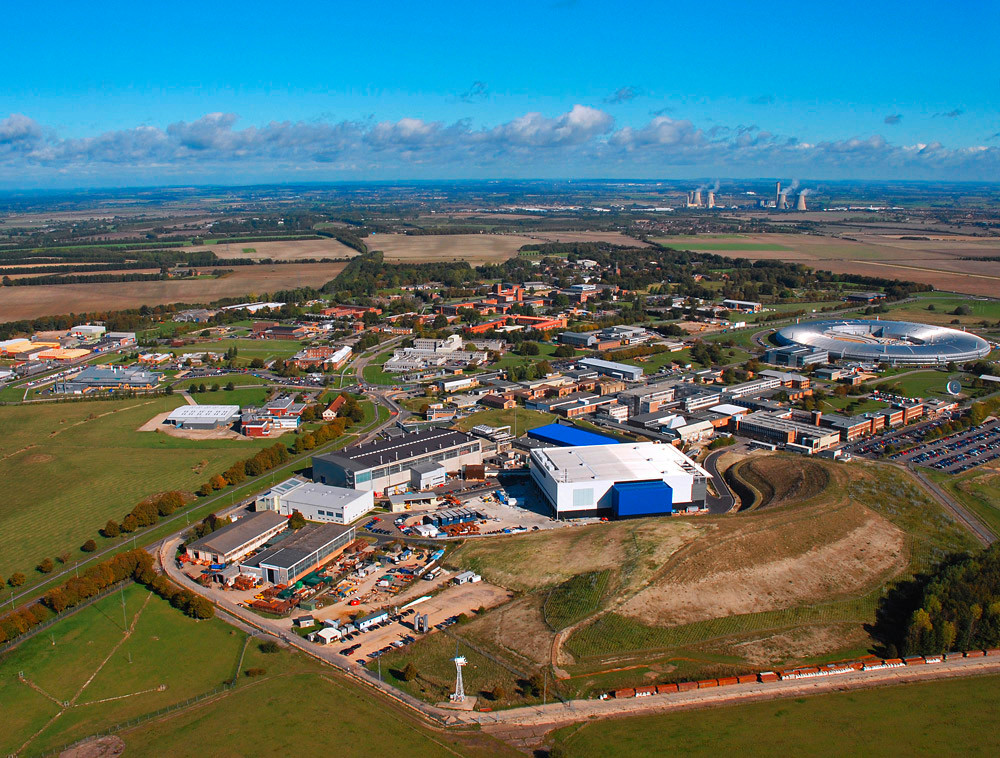
Aerial view of the Rutherford Appleton Laboratory, with the Diamond Light Source in the background.

Parts of the Harwell Science and Innovation Campus lie within Chilton parish. The Rutherford Appleton Laboratory is located on the Harwell Campus, on a site described by UK Research and Innovation as the Chilton site. A laboratory has operated there since 1957 and it is now managed by the Science and Technology Facilities Council.

== Notable people ==
- John Latton (c. 1484–1548), lawyer, landowner and Member of Parliament, was described as "of Chilton"; he represented Oxford in Parliament and later served as treasurer and governor of the Inner Temple.
- Sir Thomas Metcalfe, 1st Baronet (1745–1813), East India Company director and Member of Parliament for Abingdon, acquired the manor of Chilton. His baronetcy, created in 1802, was styled "of Chilton in the County of Berkshire".
- Len Cundell (1879–1939), racehorse trainer, trained at Lime Tree House and later the Bungalow Stables in Chilton. His horses included Noble Star, winner of the Ascot Stakes, Goodwood Stakes, Cesarewitch and Jockey Club Cup in 1931.
- Joan Seton McConnell (1918–1996), painter and illustrator, lived in Chilton. Her work included rural landscapes and industrial and scientific subjects associated with AERE Harwell and Culham.
- Sonny Leong, Baron Leong (born 1953), businessman, publisher and politician, has lived in Chilton. He was created a life peer in 2022 as Baron Leong, of Chilton in the County of Oxfordshire and of Camden Town in the London Borough of Camden.
