= South Moreton =

Village in Oxfordshire, England

Coordinates: 51.589°N 1.191°W

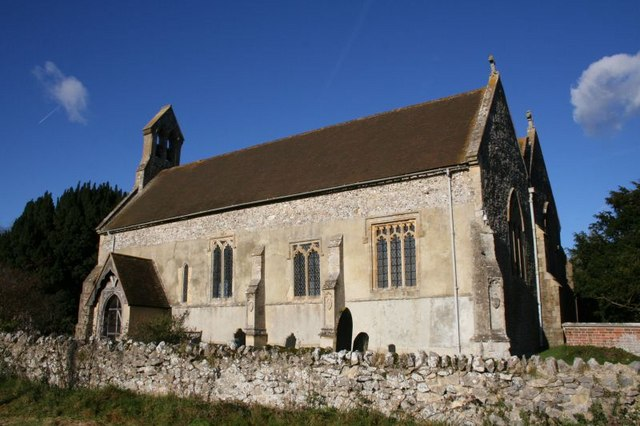
- Parish church of St John the Baptist

- Location within Oxfordshire
- Area: 5.46 km^{2} (2.11 sq mi)
- Population: 420 (2011 census)
  - Density: 77/km^{2} (200/sq mi)
- OS grid reference: SU561881
- Civil parish: South Moreton
- District: South Oxfordshire
- Shire county: Oxfordshire
- Region: South East
- Country: England
- Sovereign state: United Kingdom
- Post town: Didcot
- Postcode district: OX11
- Dialling code: 01235
- Police: Thames Valley
- Fire: Oxfordshire
- Ambulance: South Central
- UK Parliament: Didcot and Wantage
- Website: South Moreton Village website

South Moreton is a village and civil parish in South Oxfordshire, England, about 3 miles (5 km) east of Didcot, 4 miles (6.4 km) west of Wallingford, and 7 miles (11 km) south of Abingdon. It is separated by the Great Western Railway cutting from its twin village of North Moreton, a quarter of a mile to the north. Mortune took its name in the Domesday Book from the houses on the ridge above the moor of Hakka's Brook (now known as the Hagbourne or Hadden Marsh), and was part of Berkshire until the 1974 boundary changes. The 2011 census recorded the parish population as 420.

== Manors ==
The Domesday Book of 1086 refers to Moretune, with no less than five manors. Its meaning is not entirely clear but three of the five manor houses are still clearly identifiable.

Saunderville is still called The Manor. It is a moated manor house with horses grazing in the railed paddocks.

Huse or Bray is a recently renovated and renamed low building, with a paddock in front, at the T-junction at the east end of the village. A small piece of mediaeval brickwork is visible in the Western gable. The Hall, a walled Victorian estate, was built in its curtilage.

The only trace of Adresham is the terrace on which it once stood, opposite the village school with a 1950s house on the site. In the middle ages this manor was held by the Ponts or Points family, and known as "Ponts Homestall": "The Ponts" or "Ponts Court" on the High Street is almost at the NorthEastern corner of the demesne, and "Homestall" is by the corner of High Street and Church Lane, to the West of the manor house site.

Fulscot manor is 1/2 mile (800 m) west of the village, and is still a farm.

It seems likely that the fifth manor on the Moreton ridge was that later held by Sir Miles Stapleton, in North Moreton.

South Moreton Inclosure Act 1818
- Act of Parliament
- Parliament of the United Kingdom
- Long title: An Act for inclosing Lands in the Parish of South Moreton, in the County of Berks.
- Citation: 58 Geo. 3. c. 18 Pr.

Dates
- Royal assent: 8 May 1818

At the time of the South Moreton Inclosure Act 1818 (58 Geo. 3. c. 18 Pr.), the main landlord was Henry Hucks Gibbs, 1st Baron Aldenham, and many of the inclosures were allotted to him. Eventually a London butcher called Hedges used Rich's Sidings of the new Great Western Railway (2 miles (3 km) west by Didcot railway station) to supply much of the London meat trade. Hedges amassed a fortune and much local land, including the inclosures at Hall Farm and Fulscot Manor, both of which are still owned and farmed by his descendants.

== Church and chapel ==
The Church of England parish church of Saint John the Baptist at Bethesda, with its possibly Saxon doorway, stands by ancient earthworks at the southwestern edge of the village, by a ford on the former pilgrim route from the Downs to Dorchester. The church holds services only on major feast days and a few other occasions. Weddings, funerals and baptisms are also held by arrangement. The parish is part of the Churn Benefice, along with the neighbouring parishes of North Moreton, Aston Tirrold, Aston Upthorpe, Blewbury, Hagbourne, and Upton.

In a central position on the High Street, South Moreton has a Strict Baptist chapel.

== Character and amenities ==
There are a few large old houses on the High Street, some newer cottages at the east of the village, modern social housing to the west, and some 17th-century cottages between, many thatched. The largest house in South Moreton is The Hall, very close to the Huse. It is the last working farm in the village. Much Victorian history of the village is recorded in The Rector's Book, handwritten around 1905 from memories extending to 1845. It is now deposited in the Berkshire County Archives in Reading.

South Moreton has a school, a community-owned pub, a church and a chapel.

=== School ===
South Moreton School, 200 yards (180 m) from the former village school, is a county primary school. with an attached pre-school.

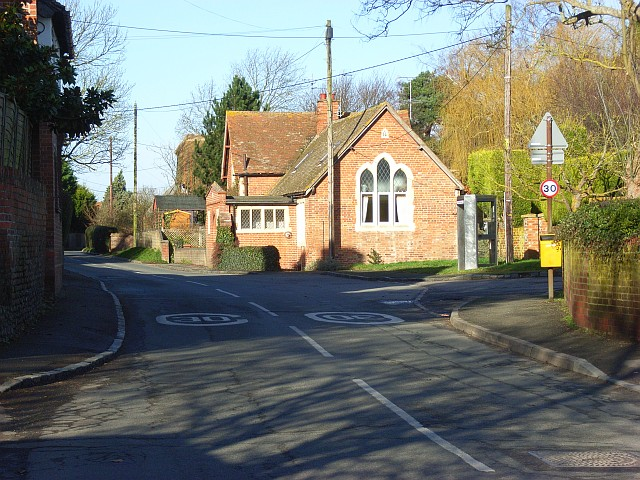
The Old Church School (built 1827 as the previous village school) at the junction of the High Street with Church Lane (left) and Clement's Green (right)

=== Community pub ===
The Crown Inn is the only surviving public house in the village. Formerly owned by Wadworth Brewery, it was saved from demolition and redevelopment in the late 2010s by the South Moreton Community Benefit Society who lobbied the district council to designate the building as an Asset of Community Value and reject a planning application to convert it to housing. The society fundraised to buy the pub, and reopened it in May 2019 as a community pub.

At the time of the building of the Great Western Railway, the fit young "navvies" (originally "navigators") offered cash for lodgings, so many more of the village cottages were opened as public houses. The only one which still bears its name from that time is The Anchor on the road to the Astons, now extensively rebuilt.

=== Transport ===
Thames Travel route 94 provides a term-time weekday service to South Moreton, linking the village with Didcot and Didcot Parkway railway station. Didcot Parkway, 3 miles (4.8 km) provides rail services to the rest of the country and has frequent 40-minute train services to and from London Paddington. Cholsey railway station is equally close and is served by the line between Reading, Didcot Parkway and Oxford.

== Bibliography ==
- Ditchfield, PH; Page, William, eds. (1924). "South Moreton". A History of the County of Berkshire. Victoria County History. Vol. IV. assisted by John Hautenville Cope. London: The St Katherine Press. pp. 498–504.
- Pevsner, Nikolaus (1966). Berkshire. The Buildings of England. Harmondsworth: Penguin Books. pp. 222–223.
