= Len Cundell =

English racehorse trainer (1879–1939)

Leonard Ambrose Cundell (1879 – 15 December 1939), commonly known as Len Cundell, was an English racehorse trainer. Based for much of his career at Chilton, then in Berkshire, he was particularly associated with the racehorse Noble Star, winner of the Ascot Stakes, Goodwood Stakes, Cesarewitch and Jockey Club Cup in 1931.

== Early life and military service ==
Cundell was born in 1879 at Liddington, Wiltshire. He was the second son of farmer and butcher Matthew Henry Cundell and his wife Emma Willis, and grew up at Coley Park Farm near Reading in Berkshire.

Before his racing career Cundell served in the Berkshire Imperial Yeomanry, reaching the rank of sergeant. He was awarded the Imperial Yeomanry Long Service and Good Conduct Medal in August 1907. During the First World War he served as a lieutenant in the Army Remount Service, including service in Egypt. The Remount Service was responsible for obtaining and caring for horses and mules for military use.

== Racehorse training career ==
Cundell established himself as a racehorse trainer at Chilton. By the early 1920s he was training from Lime Tree House in the village, before moving his horses to the Bungalow Stables in late 1923.

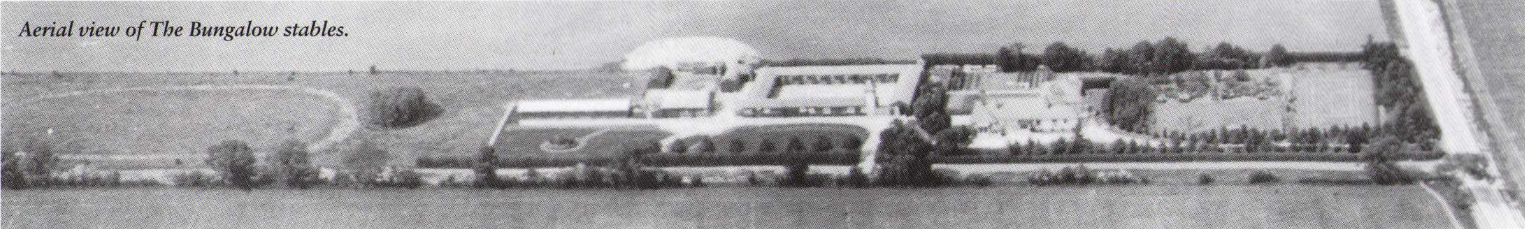
Aerial view of the Bungalow Stables at Chilton, shortly before the site was acquired for the construction of RAF Harwell. Thorningdown Road runs alongside the site.

The Bungalow Stables had been established in 1905 and were reportedly named after the bungalow on the site, said to have been the first building of its type in Chilton. The establishment included a large bungalow, about 30 loose boxes and other buildings, together with training gallops on the surrounding chalk downs.

The chalk soil around Chilton provided well-drained turf for gallops, while the nearby railway gave the stable access to race meetings around the country. Cundell trained both Flat and National Hunt horses and built a successful stable during the late 1920s and 1930s.

=== Noble Star ===
Cundell's best-known horse was Noble Star, a bay colt foaled in 1927. Noble Star initially raced in relatively modest company, but developed into one of Britain's leading staying horses under Cundell.

In 1931 Noble Star won the Ascot Stakes over two miles, ridden by Freddie Fox. He subsequently won the British Goodwood Stakes at Goodwood Racecourse, a long-distance handicap over approximately two miles and three furlongs.

Noble Star then won the Cesarewitch at Newmarket Racecourse in October, carrying top weight in a field of 26 runners. He completed his season by winning the Jockey Club Cup at Newmarket.

The four victories in the Ascot Stakes, Goodwood Stakes, Cesarewitch and Jockey Club Cup made Noble Star one of the outstanding staying horses of the 1931 season.

A later history of the Bungalow Stables records that Cundell had considerable confidence in Noble Star. It also recounts an occasion before the Jockey Club Cup when Cundell accepted an informal side bet from the Aga Khan, whose horses were among the favourites; Noble Star subsequently won the race. Noble Star was retired to the Overtown Stud at Wroughton in 1932.

The horse's success also became part of village folklore. A history published by the Harwell site records that, before the Cesarewitch, a report that Noble Star had been coughing caused his odds to lengthen considerably. He nevertheless won, and members of the Chilton stable and local residents who had backed him benefited from the longer odds.

== Loss of the Bungalow Stables ==
In the mid-1930s the Air Ministry selected land around Chilton for construction of a new Royal Air Force station, later known as RAF Harwell. The proposed airfield included the Bungalow Stables and Cundell's training grounds.

Cundell resisted the loss of the establishment. According to a later account of the negotiations, officials offered to construct a replacement bungalow, but Cundell's principal concern was the loss of his established gallops. The turf on the chalk downs had developed over many years and could not simply be recreated at another site.

After searching for a suitable replacement, Cundell purchased the approximately 1,100-acre (450 ha) Blewburton Hall Estate at Aston Tirrold, which included suitable gallops on the Berkshire Downs. The Cundell family left the Bungalow Stables in 1934.

In 1935 the Air Ministry compulsorily purchased the Chilton site for £11,650. Construction of RAF Harwell subsequently removed the Bungalow Stables and much of the surrounding racehorse-training landscape.

Cundell continued to train at Blewburton Hall during the remainder of the 1930s.

== Personal life and death ==
Cundell married in 1927. His children Matthew and Jane were born while the family lived at the Bungalow Stables. His daughter Jane McKee later wrote Trainer: The Story of a Racehorse Training Dynasty, a history of the Cundell family's involvement in horse racing.

Cundell died suddenly at Blewburton Hall on 15 December 1939, aged 59.

== Legacy ==
Cundell's stable became a training ground for a number of people who later established racing careers of their own. Jack Waugh rode winners for Cundell before taking out a trainer's licence in 1933 and establishing his own stable at Chilton. Waugh later trained hundreds of winners before retiring in 1964.

Members of the wider Cundell family also continued in racehorse training. Frank Cundell began his career in Cundell's stable and later took over the Blewburton establishment. The family's racing history continued for several generations.
