= Blewburton Hill =

Hillfort in Oxfordshire, England

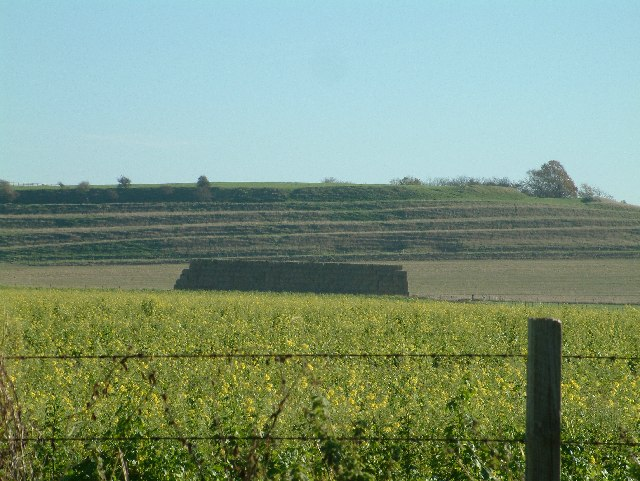
- Lynchets on the west side of Blewburton Hill, Oxfordshire

- Location within Oxfordshire
- 51.572°N 1.212°W
- Periods: Iron Age
- Location: Oxfordshire

Site notes
- Excavation dates: 1947–49 & 1967
- Public access: Yes (western part)

Scheduled monument
- Official name: Blewburton Hill
- Reference no.: 1006301

Blewburton Hill is the site of an Iron Age hillfort located in Oxfordshire, in the southeast of England. It was a univallate hillfort (with a single rampart). The area is mostly farmland with some small areas of wooded copse to the south and the northeast. The hill fort may have been occupied from the 4th century BC to the 1st century BC, and replaced a small settlement surrounded by a stockade, which is estimated to have been built in the 5th or 6th century BC.

The hill demonstrates three principal phases, with the first consisting of a timber palisade surrounding a small settlement consisting of a few huts, dating to about 550 BC. This was later replaced in the 4th century BC by the first version of the hillfort, which covered twice the area as that included within the earlier palisade, with a single rampart and shallow ditch. After a period of abandonment, the hillfort was refortified around 100 BC, and the ditch was deepened. The fort was finally abandoned about 50 BC, with some evidence for a violent end to its occupation. During the early Anglo-Saxon period, the hilltop was used as a cemetery.

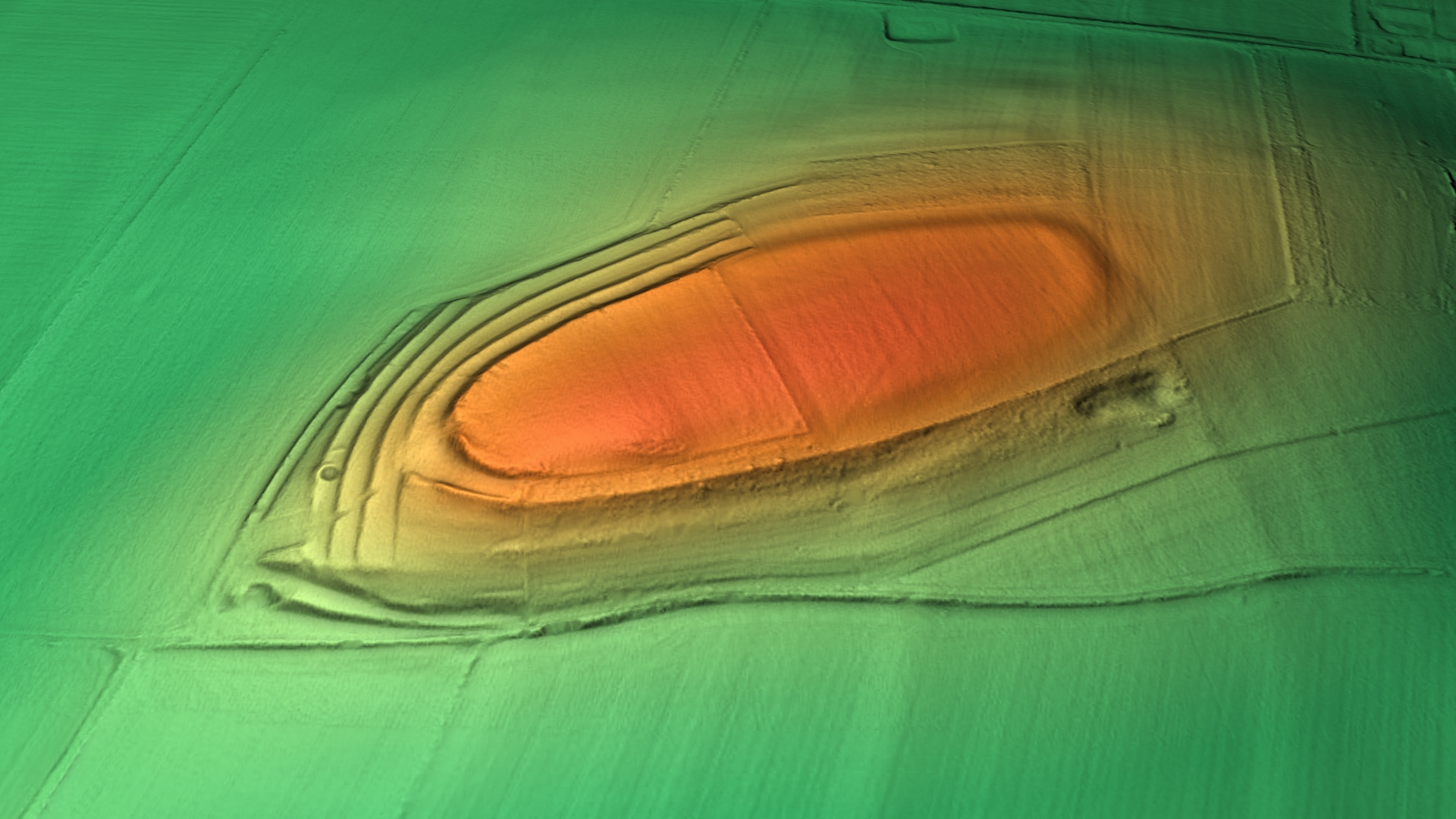
3D view of the digital terrain model

The west side of the hill features a number of lynchets (terraces), the age and function of which are unknown, although they are believed to post-date the Iron Age.

The site has been designated as a scheduled monument.

== Location ==
Blewburton Hill is situated between the villages of Aston Tirrold and Blewbury. The site is within the parish of Aston Upthorpe in the district of South Oxfordshire. Its coordinates are grid reference SU546861.

== Description ==
The hillfort encloses an area of approximately 4 hectares (430,000 sq ft). There was an 11-metre (36 ft) wide entrance on the west side of the fort, which may have possessed an overhead walkway. The gateway was protected by a ditch behind it, although this was later filled in. Unusually, a number of horse burials were found within the entrance. The gateway appears to have been set back within an approaching corridor between the rampart. During the second phase of the fort, excavated postholes demonstrate that it possessed a double gate.

The rampart was built a considerable time later than the original timber palisade that defended the early settlement. The rampart was originally 6.4 metres (21 ft) wide, with a 4 metres (13 ft) gap between the inner and outer retaining timber supports. The rampart was built from chalk packed firmly between the timber retainers. The second phase of the rampart was of the "Low Dump" type, with an asymmetrical cross-section and a shallow incline towards the rear, with a much steeper front dropping directly into the ditch. This replaced the earlier filled-timber wall-and-fill style of rampart. In the eastern part of the hillfort, the rampart has been badly damaged by ploughing, and in places destroyed. In the western portion, part of the rampart survives as a sunken lynchet, and the ditch there survives as a flat terrace. In the first phase of the rampart, the ditch was approximately 1.5 metres (5 ft), but when it was recut for the second phase it was deepened to 4.6 metres (15 ft). The hill features a number of unusual terraces or lynchets, the age and function of which is unknown, although they are believed to post-date the Iron Age.

== History ==
The hillfort appears to have been relatively intensely inhabited, compared to other hillforts in the region. The site was founded around 550 BC, and initially consisted of a small number of huts within a palisade that enclosed about half the area that would be included in the later fort. In the fourth century BC, the hilltop was enclosed with a bank quarried from its external ditch and held in place by timber retaining posts.

The fort was abandoned for a time, but was refortified around 100 BC. The ditch was recut, and the spoil was piled upon the pre-existing bank. The entrance, formerly 20 metres (66 ft) wide, was narrowed to 7.5 metres (25 ft) and the flanking rampart ends were faced with dry-stone walling, the stone for which must have been imported from elsewhere. Around 50 BC the hillfort was finally abandoned, perhaps due to expansion of the Belgae. The excavators uncovered evidence for a violent end to the occupation of the fort, with collapsed ramparts, signs of burning, and dead animals left where they lay.

Centuries later, the Anglo-Saxons used the interior of the fort as a cemetery. The cemetery was dated to the early Anglo-Saxon period, and 22 buried individuals were excavated, and one cremation. Most of the remains were accompanied by grave goods.

== Finds ==
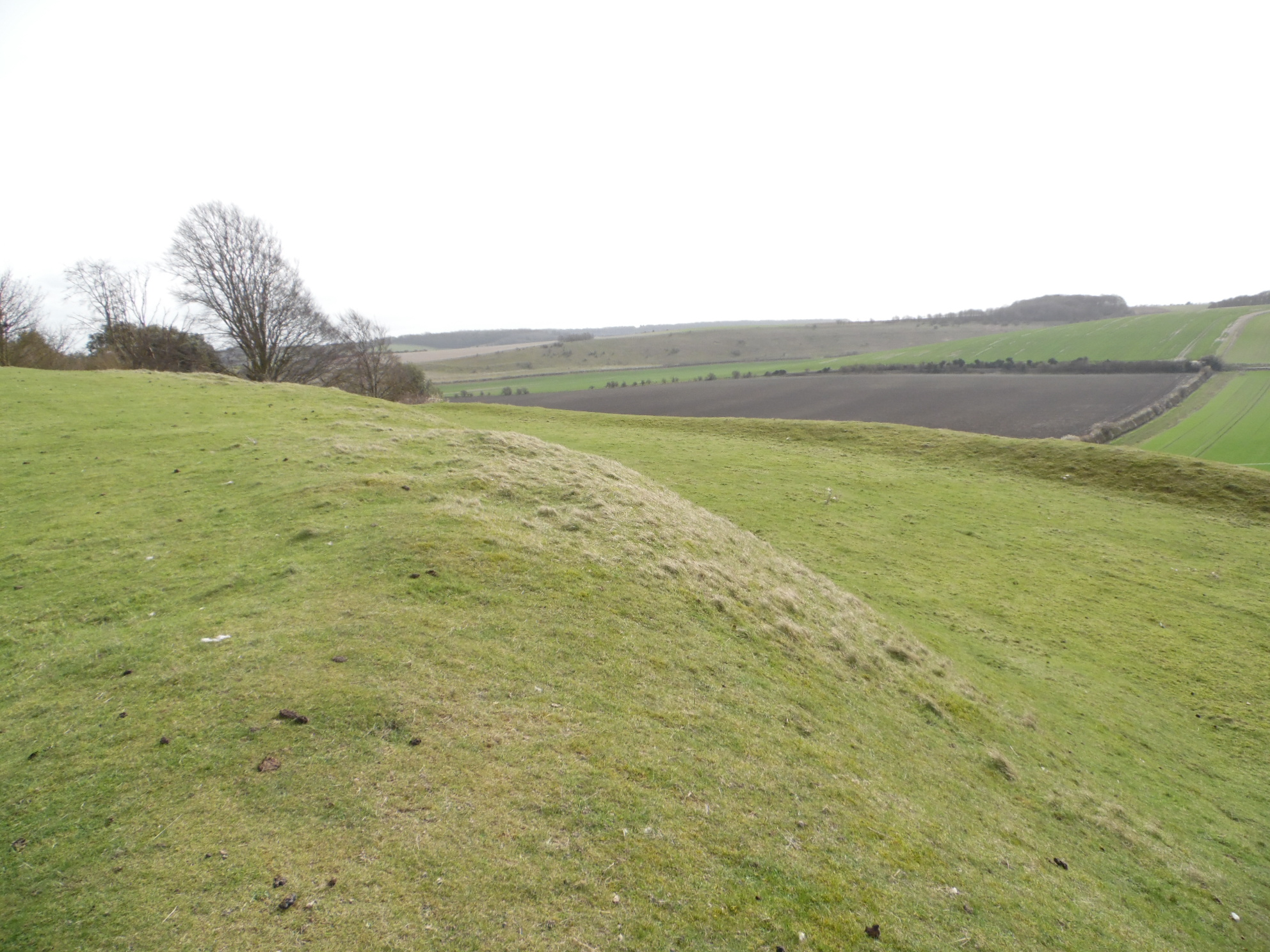
In the western portion, a part of the original rampart and ditch survive as a sunken lynchet.

Neolithic or Early Bronze Age flints were recovered during excavations, and a polished stone axe was recovered from the ditch near the entrance. Although there was no Roman occupation of the hilltop, a number of fragments of Roman pottery were recovered, dating to the 1st century AD, and the 3rd–4th centuries AD.

In one Iron Age burial pit, the remains of a horse and a dog were found buried together with the remains of a man. Other Iron Age finds include an iron currency bar, ceramics, two shale pendents and some fragments of shale bracelets.

Grave goods associated with the Anglo-Saxon cemetery included amber and glass beads, a spearhead, two bronze brooches, buckles, knives, and some pots.

== Investigation ==
Archaeological excavations were undertaken at the site between 1947 and 1953, with further investigation in 1967. The 1967 excavation was carried out by D. W. Harding, who investigated the ditch and rampart on the north side of the fort.
