= Upton, Vale of White Horse =

Village in Oxfordshire, England

Coordinates: 51.578°N 1.261°W

Upton
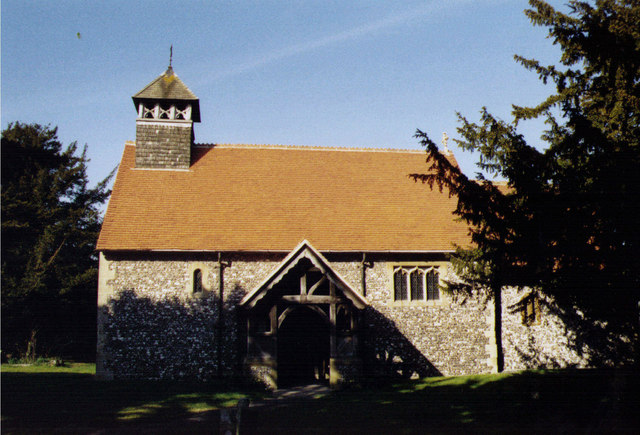
- St Mary's parish church

- Location within Oxfordshire
- Population: 421 (2011 Census)
- OS grid reference: SU5186
- Civil parish: Upton
- District: Vale of White Horse
- Shire county: Oxfordshire
- Region: South East
- Country: England
- Sovereign state: United Kingdom
- Post town: Didcot
- Postcode district: OX11
- Police: Thames Valley
- Fire: Oxfordshire
- Ambulance: South Central
- UK Parliament: Didcot and Wantage
- Website: Upton Village South Oxfordshire

Upton is a spring line village and civil parish at the foot of the Berkshire Downs, about 2 miles (3 km) south of Didcot in the Vale of the White Horse district. Historically in Berkshire, it has been administered as part of Oxfordshire, England, since the 1974 boundary changes. The 2011 Census recorded the parish's population as 421.

== Manor ==
The earliest known record of a manor of Upton is from the reign of Edward the Confessor, when it was held by a Saxon freeman called Brictric. Shortly after the Domesday Book was completed in 1086 Upton became the property of Wynebald de Ballon who in 1092 granted a moiety of the manor to the Cluniac Bermondsey Abbey. The abbey retained this moiety until the Dissolution of the Monasteries in the 16th century, when it surrendered all its lands to the Crown.

== Churches ==
=== Church of England ===
The Domesday Book of 1086 lists Optone as having a "church", but at that time both Upton and Aston Upthorpe were chapelries within the ecclesiastical parish of Blewbury. They remained until the parish of Upton and Aston Upthorpe was formed in 1862. Upton's present Church of England parish church of Saint Mary appears to be a 12th-century Norman building. It consists of only a nave and chancel, linked by a Norman arch. Three of the windows are Norman but the east window of the chancel is a trio of stepped lancets. In 1885, St Mary's was restored, the east wall of the chancel was rebuilt and the building was faced with split flints. Subsequently, the south porch was added. There is also a bell-turret with one bell. It is a Grade II* listed building. St. Mary's is now part of the Churn Benefice. The scholar Derwas Chitty was Rector of Upton from 1931 to 1968. His sister, the archaeologist Lily Chitty lived with him between 1938 and 1943.

=== Methodist ===
Upton had a Methodist church. It was a member of the Wantage and Abingdon Methodist Circuit, but is now closed.

== Economic history ==
An open field system of farming prevailed in the parish until an inclosure award was made in 1759. The Didcot, Newbury and Southampton Railway through the parish was completed in 1881, and a station to serve Upton and neighbouring Blewbury was opened in 1883. British Railways closed the line to passengers in 1962 and freight in 1967. The former Upton and Blewbury station building survives as a private house, and part of the line is now used as a pedestrian and cycle path.

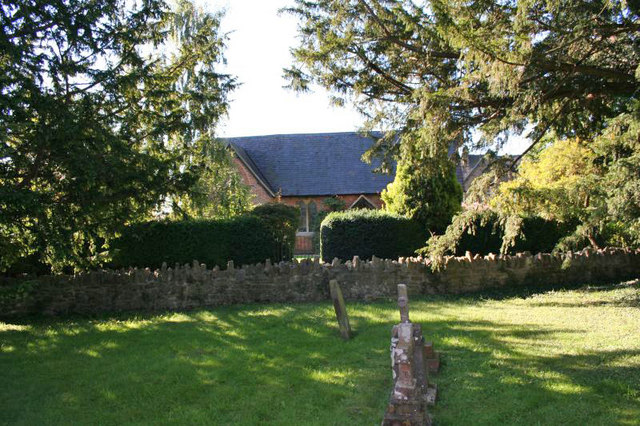
Upton School

== Transport ==
Thames Travel route 94 serves Upton from Mondays to Fridays, linking the village with Didcot town and with Didcot Parkway railway station. Buses run mostly once an hour, with a half-hourly service in the evening peak. There is no Saturday or Sunday service.

National Cycle Route 544 from Wantage to Didcot passes through the village.

== Sources ==
- Page, WH; Ditchfield, PH, eds. (1923). "Blewbury". A History of the County of Berkshire. Victoria County History. Vol. III. assisted by John Hautenville Cope. London: The St Katherine Press. pp. 280–291.
- Pevsner, Nikolaus (1966). Berkshire. The Buildings of England. Harmondsworth: Penguin Books. p. 247.

== Links ==
- Upton Village South Oxfordshire
