= RAF Harwell =

Former Royal Air Force station in Oxfordshire, England

RAF Harwell
- Chilton, East Hendred and Harwell, Oxfordshire in England
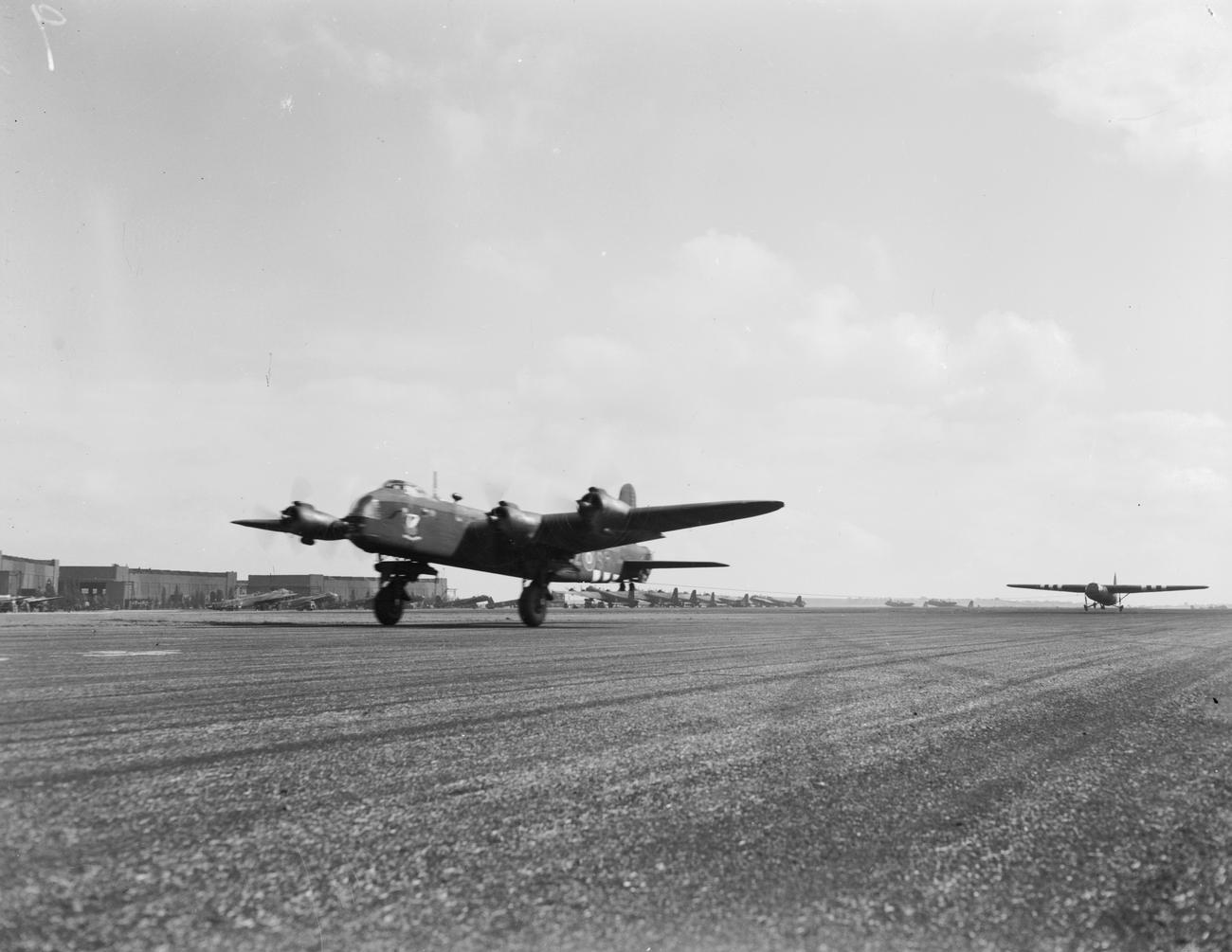
- A Short Stirling Mark IV of No. 295 Squadron RAF taking off from RAF Harwell towing an Airspeed Horsa glider on 17 September 1944. It was one of 25 Stirling/Horsa combinations carrying the headquarters of I Airborne Corps to landing zones near Groesbeek, Nijmegen, during Operation Market Garden.

Site information
- Type: Royal Air Force station
- Code: HW
- Owner: Air Ministry
- Operator: Royal Air Force
- Controlled by: RAF Bomber Command; No. 38 Group RAF

Location
- Shown within Oxfordshire RAF Harwell (the United Kingdom)
- Coordinates: 51.575°N 1.312°W

Site history
- Built: 1935–1937
- Built by: John Laing & Son Ltd
- In use: February 1937 – 31 December 1945
- Battles/wars: European theatre of World War II
- Events: Operation Tonga; Operation Mallard; Operation Market Garden

Airfield information
- Elevation: 117 metres (384 ft) AMSL

Royal Air Force Harwell or more simply RAF Harwell was a Royal Air Force station in what was then Berkshire, England, approximately 4.8 miles (7.7 km) south-east of Wantage and 17 miles (27 km) north-west of Reading. Although named after the nearby village of Harwell, most of the airfield lay within the parish of Chilton, with about a third in East Hendred and the smallest portion in Harwell.

Opened in 1937 as a bomber station, Harwell was subsequently used extensively for bomber crew training. In March 1944 it was transferred to No. 38 Group RAF for airborne operations. Aircraft and gliders operating from Harwell carried troops and equipment of the 6th Airborne Division to Normandy during the opening stages of Operation Overlord, and the station later took part in Operation Market Garden.

The RAF station closed at the end of 1945 and was transferred to the Ministry of Supply on 1 January 1946 for the establishment of the Atomic Energy Research Establishment (AERE). The former airfield now forms part of the Harwell Science and Innovation Campus, which includes the Rutherford Appleton Laboratory.

== History ==
=== Construction and early years ===
The Airfields of Britain Conservation Trust records aviation use at Harwell (Chilton) dating from the First World War, although the permanent RAF station was a later development constructed as part of the RAF expansion programme of the 1930s.

Construction of the permanent airfield began in 1935. It was built by John Laing & Son Ltd at the junction of three civil parishes. The majority of the station lay within Chilton parish, about a third was in East Hendred and the smallest portion was in Harwell. According to an account of the station's history, when the first commanding officer was asked what the new airfield should be called, he chose the parish in which his official residence stood, which was Harwell.

RAF Harwell opened as a bomber station in February 1937. Among the early flying units were No. 226 Squadron RAF, No. 105 Squadron RAF and No. 107 Squadron RAF.

No. 105 Squadron was re-formed from 'B' Flight of No. 18 Squadron RAF on 12 April 1937 and moved to Harwell later that month. Initially equipped with the biplane Hawker Audax, the squadron began receiving Fairey Battle monoplanes in August 1937 and became one of the early operational users of the type.

=== RAE Mark III catapult ===
Between 1938 and 1940 RAF Harwell was the development site for an experimental Royal Aircraft Establishment (RAE) Mark III aircraft catapult. The system was intended to accelerate heavily laden bomber aircraft to flying speed over a short distance, allowing aircraft to carry greater fuel loads without requiring correspondingly longer runways.

The installation consisted of a large rotating turntable connected to two 82-metre (269 ft) concrete tracks. Twelve Rolls-Royce Kestrel aero engines were used to compress air for an underground pneumatic ram intended to propel an aircraft along the selected track. Technical problems, including excessive engine wear and difficulties adapting the design to the aircraft it was intended to launch, led to the project being abandoned without an aircraft ever being launched from it. The mechanism was removed and the structure buried; by 1941 part of a conventional runway had been built across one of its arms. The work nevertheless contributed to later catapult-launching developments, including the system used by catapult aircraft merchant ships.

The surviving buried remains of the installation were fully excavated and recorded by archaeologists in 2023 during redevelopment of part of the former airfield. After recording, the structure was dismantled to allow construction work to continue.

=== Second World War bomber and training station ===
At the outbreak of the Second World War in September 1939, Nos. 105 and 226 Squadrons formed part of No. 72 (Bomber) Wing and deployed to France with the Advanced Air Striking Force. Other bomber units, including No. 75 (New Zealand) Squadron and No. 148 Squadron RAF, were subsequently based at Harwell.

On 8 April 1940, No. 15 Operational Training Unit (15 OTU) was formed at Harwell from the No. 3 Group Pool, which comprised Nos. 75 and 148 Squadrons. Equipped principally with Vickers Wellington bombers, its role was to train complete night-bomber crews before they were posted to operational units. From May 1940 it also trained crews intended for Wellington units overseas.

Harwell-based training crews also undertook operational duties, including leaflet-dropping sorties over occupied Europe and participation in Bomber Command operations.

The airfield itself was attacked by the Luftwaffe on several occasions. The Berkshire Historic Environment Record documents attacks on 16 September 1940, 4 April 1941 and 12 May 1941, with the latter causing damage.

The original grass flying field was upgraded in 1941 by the construction of three hard runways and associated facilities. While this work was carried out, No. 15 OTU moved temporarily to RAF Mount Farm in July 1941, returning to Harwell in February 1942. It remained at the station until it was disbanded on 15 March 1944.

An overseas ferry-training element of 15 OTU became No. 1443 (Ferry Training) Flight RAF. On 30 April 1943 it was redesignated No. 310 Ferry Training Unit RAF. No. 310 Ferry Training Unit was disbanded on 17 December 1943.

=== Airborne operations ===
In March 1944 Harwell was transferred to No. 38 Group RAF, the RAF formation responsible for transporting airborne forces. No. 295 Squadron moved to Harwell on 15 March and No. 570 Squadron arrived on 14 March. The squadrons initially operated Armstrong Whitworth Albemarle aircraft and later Short Stirling Mk IVs, carrying paratroops and towing Airspeed Horsa gliders.

Shortly before D-Day, Harwell was also used as a headquarters by the 6th Airborne Division.

==== Normandy landings ====
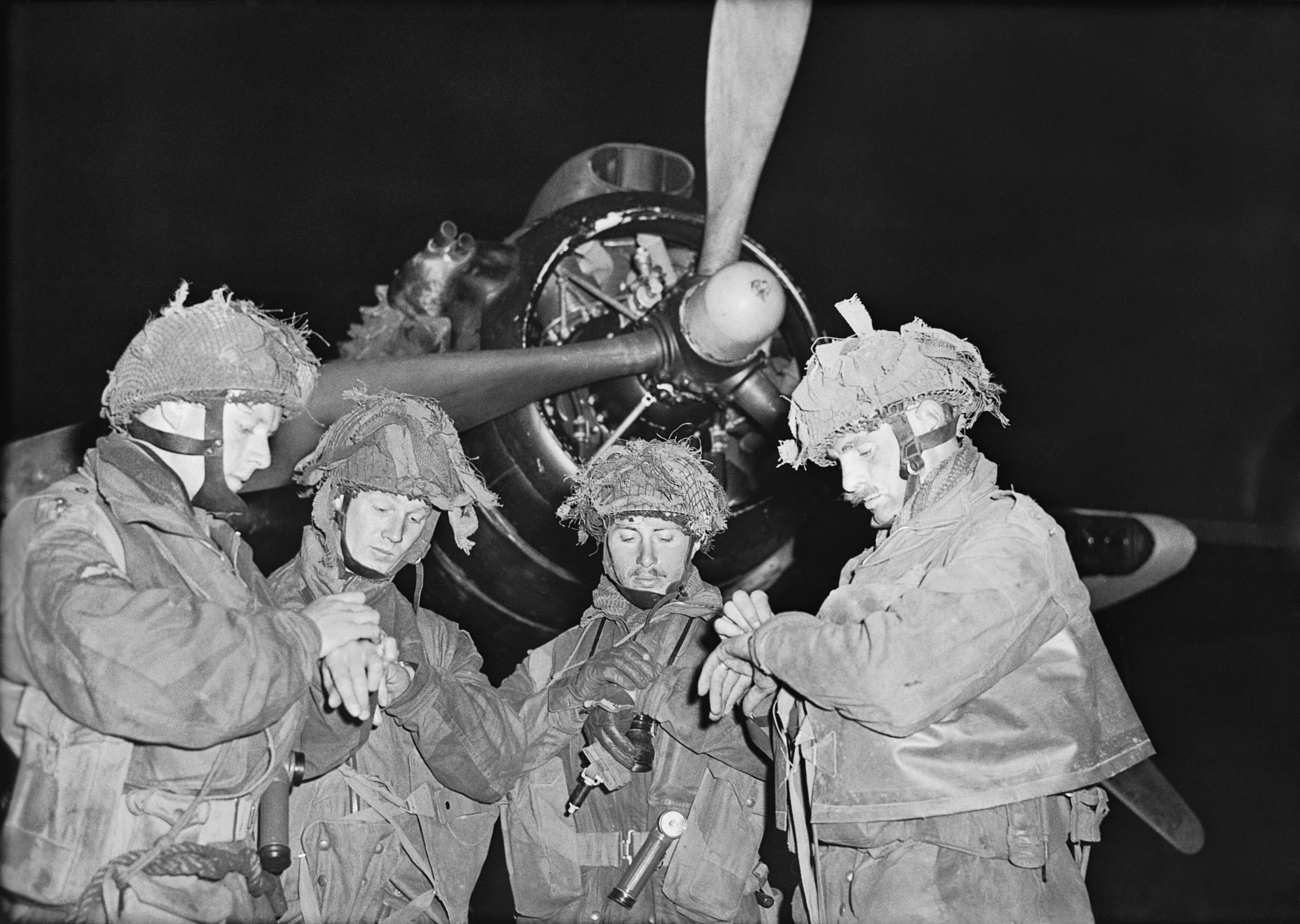
Four commanders of the 22nd Independent Parachute Company synchronising their watches in front of an Armstrong Whitworth Albemarle at RAF Harwell at about 23:00 on 5 June 1944, shortly before departing for Normandy.

RAF Harwell played a significant role in the airborne phase of the Normandy landings. On the night of 5 June 1944, aircraft from Harwell took part in Operation Tonga, the 6th Airborne Division's initial assault on Normandy. The first pathfinder aircraft departed Harwell at 23:03 carrying men of the 22nd Independent Parachute Company whose task was to mark the airborne division's drop and landing zones.

Throughout the night, 45 Albemarle aircraft of Nos. 295 and 570 Squadrons and 25 Horsa gliders of A Squadron, Glider Pilot Regiment, transported troops, divisional headquarters personnel, vehicles, guns, trailers, motorcycles and other equipment from Harwell to Normandy. Aircraft operating from the station were also involved in carrying airborne forces connected with the assault on the Merville Gun Battery, while a later sortie carried Major-General Richard Gale, commander of the 6th Airborne Division, and members of his staff to Normandy.

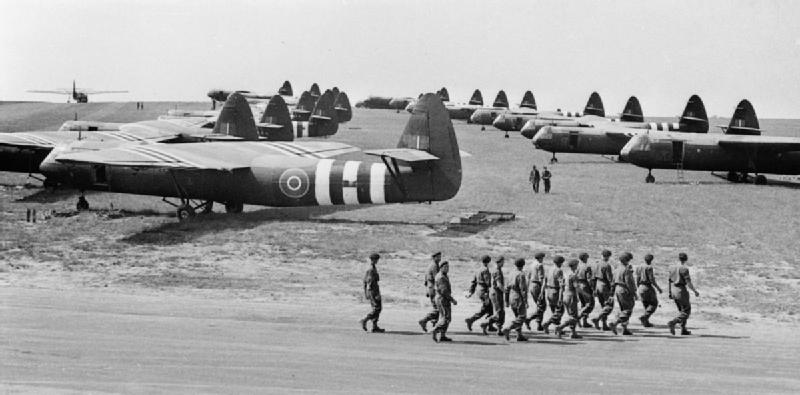
Horsa gliders and troops of the 6th Airborne Division preparing for take-off from Harwell in the run-up to D-Day.

On the evening of 6 June, Harwell participated in Operation Mallard, the second major airborne lift to reinforce the 6th Airborne Division. A further 40 Horsa gliders were towed from Harwell to Normandy.

A memorial at the end of one of the former runways commemorates the aircraft of No. 38 Group which departed Harwell on the night of 5 June carrying troops of the 6th Airborne Division.

==== Special operations ====
Following the Normandy landings, the Harwell-based airborne squadrons continued operational flying. On 7 June, aircraft of No. 295 Squadron were used to drop Special Air Service teams in the Brest peninsula. During the summer the squadron converted increasingly to the Short Stirling Mk IV while Albemarle operations continued.

Harwell was also used for clandestine operations supporting the Special Operations Executive and resistance forces in occupied Europe. Albemarle SOE operations continued during the summer of 1944 and the first operational Stirling sortie by No. 295 Squadron took place on 27 July.

==== Operation Market Garden ====
On 17 September 1944, aircraft from RAF Harwell took part in Operation Market Garden. No. 295 Squadron dispatched 25 Short Stirling/Horsa combinations from Harwell. The gliders carried the headquarters of I Airborne Corps to landing zones near Groesbeek and Nijmegen.

Nos. 295 and 570 Squadrons continued glider-towing and resupply missions during the Arnhem campaign. No. 295 Squadron flew further Operation Market resupply missions until 23 September.

No. 570 Squadron left Harwell in early October 1944 and No. 295 Squadron moved to RAF Rivenhall on 11 October.

=== Final RAF use and closure ===
Following the departure of the airborne squadrons, Harwell returned principally to training and development duties. No. 13 Operational Training Unit moved from RAF Bicester to Harwell on 12 October 1944. In March 1945 No. 60 OTU also moved to Harwell and was absorbed into No. 13 OTU the following month.

Other late-war users included the Engine Control Instructional Flight and the Transport Command Development Unit. The airfield was reduced to care-and-maintenance status in July 1945. RAF use ended at the close of the year, with the station closing on 31 December 1945.

=== Units based at Harwell ===
The following RAF squadrons were based at Harwell at various times:

- No. 75 (New Zealand) Squadron RAF
- No. 105 Squadron RAF
- No. 107 Squadron RAF
- No. 148 Squadron RAF
- No. 215 Squadron RAF
- No. 226 Squadron RAF
- No. 295 Squadron RAF
- No. 570 Squadron RAF

Other units recorded as having been based at, or operated from, Harwell include:

- No. 3 Group Pool
- No. 5 Servicing Flight RAF
- No. 13 Operational Training Unit
- No. 15 Operational Training Unit
- No. 72 (Bomber) Wing RAF
- No. 91 Group Servicing Section
- No. 310 Ferry Training Unit RAF
- No. 737 Defence Squadron RAF
- No. 1443 (Ferry Training) Flight RAF
- No. 2741 Squadron RAF Regiment
- No. 2766 Squadron RAF Regiment
- Engine Control Instructional Flight RAF
- Ferry Training and Despatch Flight RAF
- Station Flight Harwell
- Transport Command Development Unit RAF

== Post-war use ==
The former RAF station was transferred by the Air Ministry to the Ministry of Supply on 1 January 1946. The existing airfield infrastructure, including roads, utilities and large aircraft hangars, made the site suitable for conversion into the new Atomic Energy Research Establishment (AERE). John Cockcroft became the establishment's first director.

The change of use marked the beginning of Harwell's major post-war role in British nuclear and scientific research. Former RAF buildings and hangars were adapted for research purposes; one wartime aircraft hangar was modified during construction of the BEPO reactor.

In 1957, the Rutherford High Energy Laboratory was established immediately to the south of AERE Harwell as part of the National Institute for Research in Nuclear Science. It later developed into the Rutherford Appleton Laboratory.

The former RAF and AERE sites subsequently developed into the present Harwell Science and Innovation Campus. Some former military buildings and elements of the wartime airfield layout survive within the campus, although the runways themselves have largely been incorporated into later development or returned to other uses.

=== 1957 T-33 incident ===
On 22 April 1957, a two-seat Lockheed T-33 Shooting Star belonging to the United States Air Force made an unexpected landing on the former airfield. The aircraft was flying from Kent towards Bournemouth when its crew experienced compass and instrument problems and became short of fuel in deteriorating weather. Seeing the former runways and hangars at Harwell, the crew believed they had located RAF Abingdon and landed on what had become Fermi Avenue, bursting two tyres while braking.

Rather than dismantling the aircraft, an attempt was made to fly it out using rocket-assisted take-off equipment to compensate for the shortened available runway. During the attempt one wing struck the ground and the aircraft passed through security fencing, eventually coming to rest close to the GLEEP reactor. No-one was injured, and the aircraft was subsequently recovered by the United States Air Force.

Following the incident, measures were taken to make the former runways less likely to be mistaken for an operational aerodrome from the air.

== Memorials ==
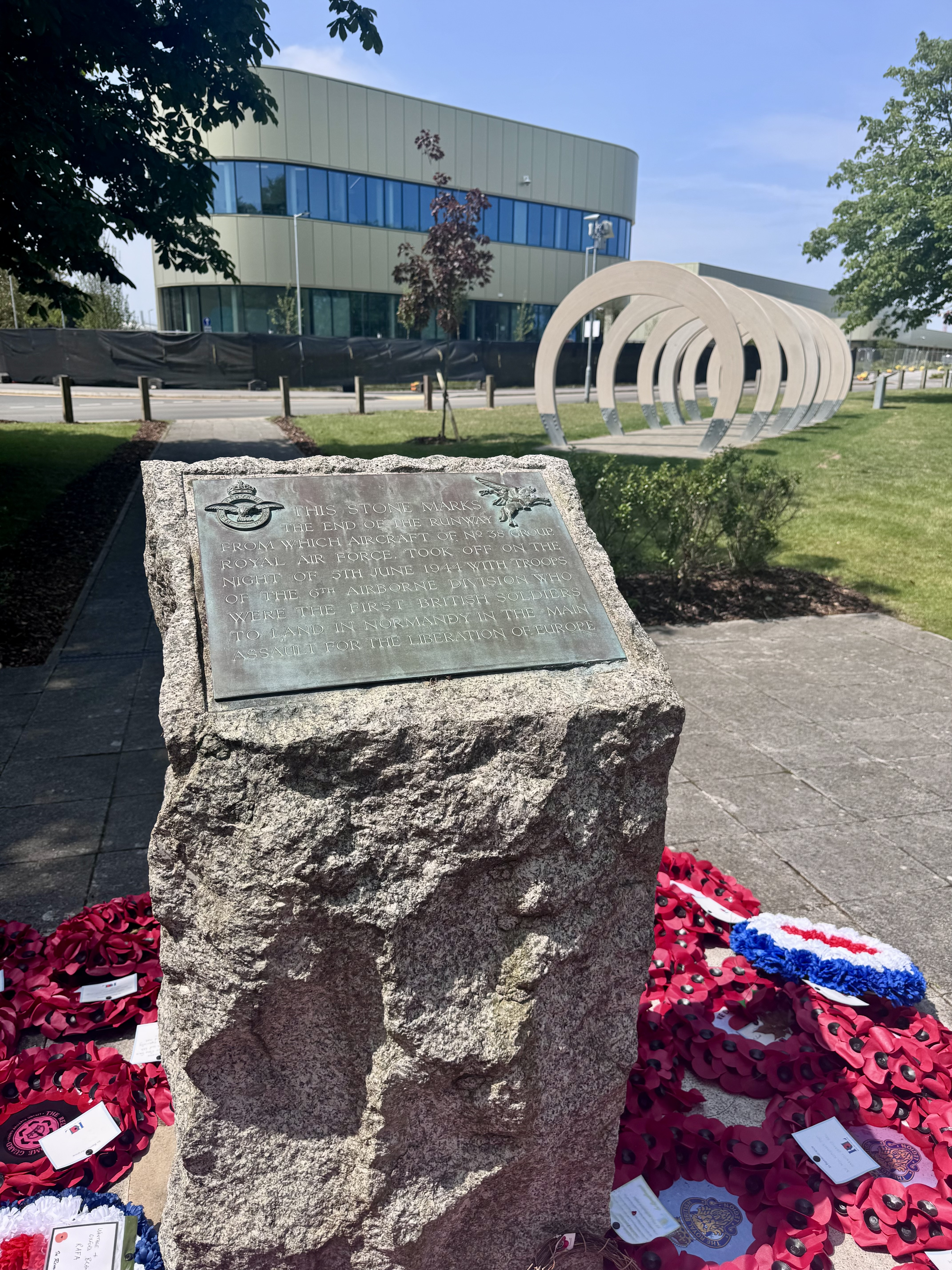
The No. 38 Group RAF D-Day memorial stone and commemorative Horsa sculpture at the former RAF Harwell airfield.

A granite memorial stone stands at the end of one of RAF Harwell's former runways, commemorating the aircraft and personnel of No. 38 Group RAF and the 6th Airborne Division who departed the airfield on the night of 5 June 1944.

The memorial was unveiled by General Sir Richard Gale on 14 May 1955. Sir John Cockcroft, the first director of AERE Harwell, accepted responsibility for the memorial and its Garden of Remembrance on behalf of the research establishment. A D-Day commemoration service continues to be held at the site annually.

In June 2025, a second memorial known as the Horsa Sculpture was unveiled alongside the original stone. Designed by Oxfordshire artist Charlotte Holmes, its form is inspired by the internal structure of an Airspeed Horsa glider. The sculpture commemorates the 6th Airborne Division, No. 38 Group RAF and the Glider Pilot Regiment and their involvement in the Normandy landings.
