= Upton and Blewbury railway station =

Former railway station in England

Coordinates: 51.5787°N 1.2640°W

Upton and Blewbury
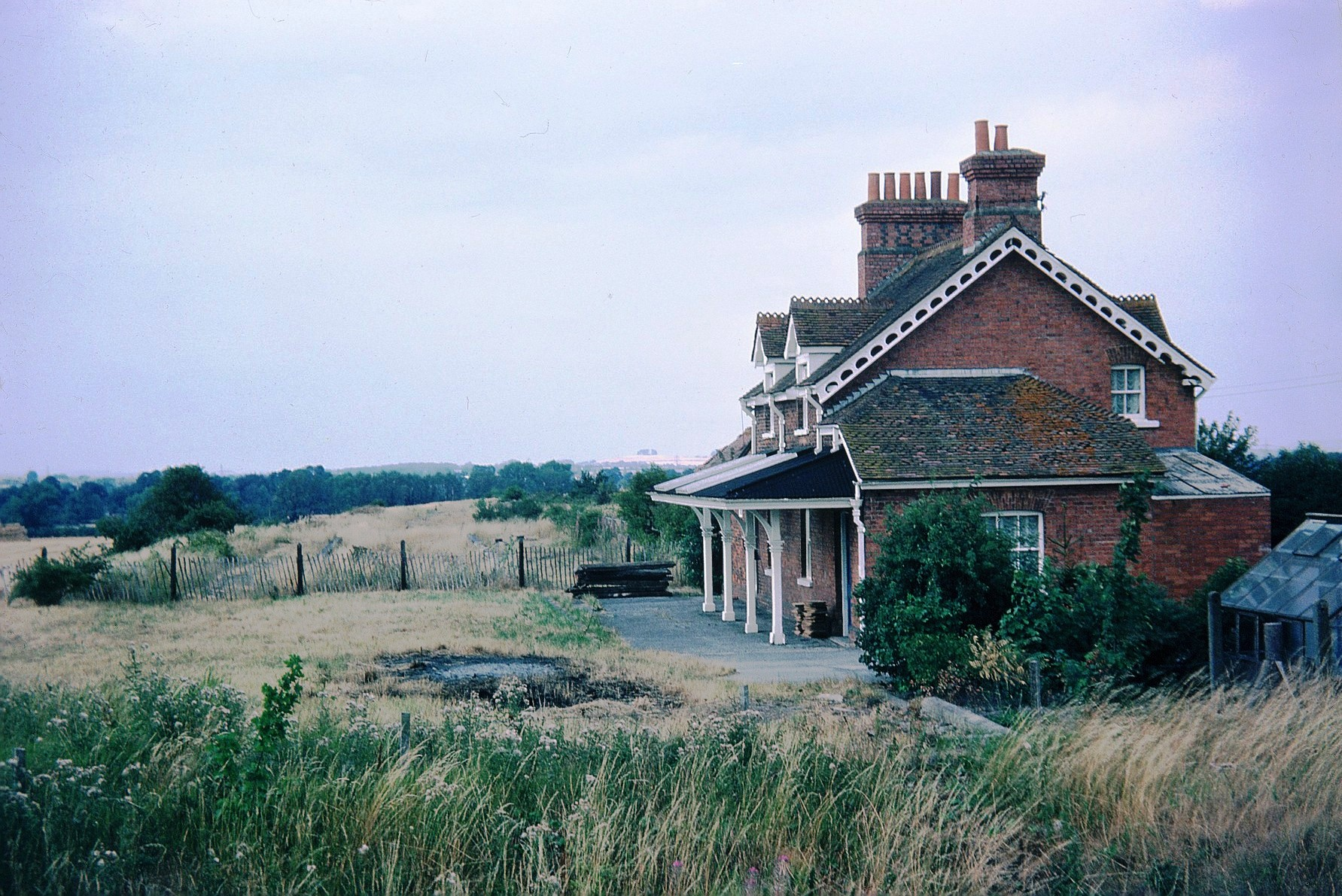
- Upton and Blewbury station seen in 1976

General information
- Location: Upton, Vale of White Horse, Oxfordshire; England
- Grid reference: SU511869
- Platforms: 2

Other information
- Status: Disused

History
- Original company: Didcot, Newbury and Southampton Railway
- Pre-grouping: Didcot, Newbury and Southampton Railway
- Post-grouping: Great Western Railway; Western Region of British Railways

Key dates
- 13 April 1882: Opened as Upton
- 16 January 1911: Renamed Upton and Blewbury
- 4 August 1942: Closed
- 8 March 1943: Re-opened
- 10 September 1962: Closed
Location

Upton and Blewbury railway station was a station on the Didcot, Newbury and Southampton Railway in England. It served Upton, with Blewbury and West Hagbourne being only 1 mile (1.6 km) from the station. It was opened in 1882 to serve military camps in the area. Originally named Upton; Blewbury was added to the name of the station in 1911 to recognise the more distant but larger village in the Vale of White Horse. In the latter part of the station's history it also served the Atomic Energy Research Establishment at Harwell. The station closed in 1962.

== Facilities ==
The station comprised two platforms, with the ticket office and station buildings located on the southbound platform on a passing loop. The northbound platform, linked by two paths across the tracks at either end for access, had a small wooden shelter and a signal box at its northern end. To the North of the station was a headshunt and two sidings, one flanking the southbound platform used for loading horses and other goods, the other siding curving to the east.

== The site today ==
The station building is still in excellent condition with a recent extension in the original style. It even retains its original canopy, although it has also been recently surrounded by further housing. The original station approach and car park area has been named "Beeching Close".

== Routes ==
| Preceding station | Disused railways | Following station |
|---|---|---|
| Didcot; Line closed, station open | Great Western Railway; Didcot, Newbury and Southampton Railway | Churn; Line and station closed |
