= John Latton =

16th-century English politician

John Latton (1484/85–1548), of the Inner Temple, London and Upton in Berkshire (now Oxfordshire), was an English politician.

Latton was MP for Oxford in 1529 and 1539.
