= Blewbury =

Village in Oxfordshire, England

Coordinates: 51°34′16″N 1°13′48″W

- Village and civil parish
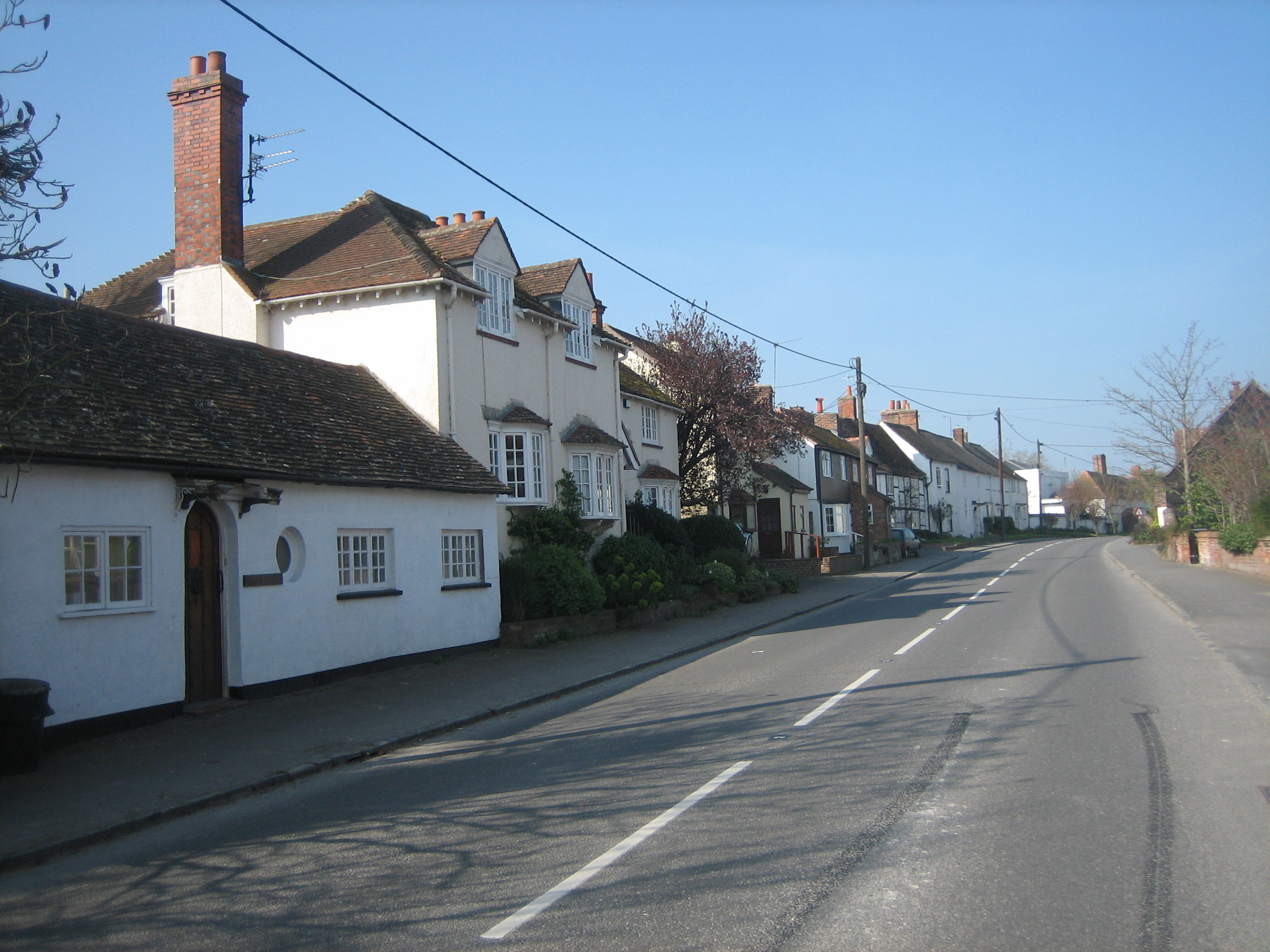
- Blewbury

- Location within Oxfordshire
- Area: 19.24 km^{2} (7.43 sq mi)
- Population: 1,657 (2011 Census)
  - Density: 86/km^{2} (220/sq mi)
- OS grid reference: SU5385
- Civil parish: Blewbury
- District: Vale of White Horse
- Shire county: Oxfordshire
- Region: South East
- Country: England
- Sovereign state: United Kingdom
- Post town: Didcot
- Postcode district: OX11
- Dialling code: 01235
- Police: Thames Valley
- Fire: Oxfordshire
- Ambulance: South Central
- UK Parliament: Didcot and Wantage
- Website: Blewbury

Blewbury is a village and civil parish at the foot of the Berkshire Downs section of the North Wessex Downs about 4 miles (6.4 km) south of Didcot, 14 miles (23 km) south of Oxford and 50 miles (80 km) west of London. It was part of Berkshire until the 1974 boundary changes transferred it to Oxfordshire. The 2011 Census recorded the parish's population as 1,581.

A number of springs rise at the foot of the escarpment of the downs. Some springs feed a small lake called the Watercress Beds, where watercress used to be grown. From here and elsewhere tributaries feed the Mill Brook which carries the water to the river Thames at Wallingford. The A417 road runs along below the escarpment above the springs and through the south of the village. The Blewbury citizens are often called Blewbarians.

== Prehistory ==
The southern part of the parish is chalk downland and includes a number of prehistoric sites. The Ridgeway is an ancient trackway that passes just south of the parish. Half of the 360 feet (110 m) high Blewburton Hill is in the parish. It is topped by an Iron Age hill fort that may have been occupied from the 4th century BC to the 1st century BC. The parish's highest point is the 520 feet (160 m) Churn Hill, 1 1/2 miles (2.4 km) southwest of the village. On its northwestern side are two round barrows, the larger of which is Churn Knob.

There are other round barrows further south, towards the boundaries with Compton and East Ilsley parishes. During the Roman occupation, a shrine or temple was built near the Ridgeway on Lowbury Hill. A 7th-century Anglo-Saxon burial mound, containing a sword and hanging bowl (which were relocated to The Oxfordshire Museum), can be found near to the Roman shrine or temple.

== Manors ==
The parish was historically divided into three manors. The Great Manor was held by the Crown until the 17th century. The Prebendal Manor was held by the Church. Nottingham Fee was bought by a long-established local family, the Humfreys, in about 1652. They retained some of it including the manor house Hall Barn until recent times.

== Parish church ==
The earliest parts of the Church of England parish church of St Michael the Archangel are the early Norman 11th-century nave and sanctuary. At least two Norman windows survive. St Michael's was transformed in the late Norman period in about 1190, when the transepts and present chancel were built to make it a cruciform church. At the crossing a central tower was built, and of this only the columns and vault survive. The south aisle was added in the 13th century, linked with the nave by a five-bay arcade in which the two western arches are taller than the other three. In the 14th century the north aisle were added with its two-bay arcade of octagonal columns, and the Lady chapel south of the chancel.

The west tower was also added in the 15th century. This may be when the central tower was dismantled, leaving only the columns and vault visible inside the church. Also from the 15th-century, are the choir stalls, the screen between the chancel and Lady chapel, the baptismal font and a doorway to a former rood loft. Inside St Michael's are several monumental brasses, most of which are late Medieval. One is of a priest, John Balam, who died in 1496. A triple brass from about 1500 depicts a knight and his two successive wives. Another represents Sir John Daunce, who died in 1545, with his wife who died in 1523 and their children. Another depicts John Latton, who died in 1548. Unusually there is also a 19th-century brass: an image of Faith in memory of John Macdonald, a boy who died aged 13 in 1841. In about 1875 the north porch was rebuilt and the nave was re-roofed. The church is a Grade I listed building.

The west tower has a ring of eight bells. Joseph Carter of Reading cast the sixth bell in 1586. As well as his name and the year, the bell bears the legend Blessed be the name of the Lorde. Henry II Knight, also of Reading, cast the third bell in 1663. His successor Samuel Knight cast the fourth bell in 1689 and the fifth bell in 1704. Edward Read of Aldbourne, Wiltshire cast the seventh bell in 1752. John Hunt, who briefly ran a bell-foundry at Cholsey, cast the tenor bell in 1825. These may have completed a ring of six bells, until John Taylor & Co of Loughborough cast the present treble and second bells in 1906. St Michael's also has a Sanctus bell that Thomas II Mears of the Whitechapel Bell Foundry cast in 1819. St Michael's parish is part of the Churn Benefice.

== Economic and social history ==
In 634, St Birinus was sent from Rome to convert the Midlands. Tradition has it that he preached to the local tribe from Churn Knob. He converted the tribe and was allowed to found Dorchester Abbey in Dorchester-on-Thames. An annual pilgrimage now walks from Churn Knob to Dorchester in celebration. Blewbury is called "this venerable village" in its Saxon charter. There is more information in the Domesday Book of 1086. At that time the population was probably about 400, and there were four water mills. Two mills remain. In the English Civil War in the 17th century Blewbury was in no man's land between King Charles I in Oxford and the Parliamentarian forces. On a day in 1644, following the Second battle of Newbury a troop of Royalist cavalry arrived at Hall Barn and demanded lunch. They had just been satisfied and left when a troop of Parliamentarians arrived with the same request, and were served at the same tables.

Blewbury Inclosure Act 1803
- Act of Parliament
- Parliament of the United Kingdom
- Long title: An Act for dividing, allotting, laying in Severalty, and inclosing the Open Fields, Common Meadows, Common Pastures, Downs, and other Commonable Lands and Waste Ground, in Blewbery in the County of Berks.
- Citation: 43 Geo. 3. c. 34 Pr.

Dates
- Royal assent: 22 April 1803

The East Field would have been open farmed, and tracks up to the downs have been deeply cut into the chalk by the frequent passage of animals. One of these tracks is still called Cow Lane. The chalk pit above the village was used to quarry chalk stone, which can be seen in houses and walls to this day. The inclosure act for the parish, the Blewbury Inclosure Act 1803 (43 Geo. 3. c. 34 Pr.) resulted in an inclosure award in 1805 which records details of the parish at that time. The Local History Society has a register of registered births and deaths in the Parish. The governance of the village fell to a number of major farming families who intermarried. They included the Humfreys, the Robinsons, and the Corderoys. There were also the variety of local tradesmen.

The Didcot, Newbury and Southampton Railway was built past the village in 1882. The nearest station was called Upton and Blewbury but was at Upton, 2 miles (3 km) away. British Railways closed the line in 1964. Around the end of the 19th century, the open areas of the downs were used for military manœuvres each summer, the camp being victualled by the local farmers. A firing range was also introduced, and was used intermittently until the 1970s. Since the 1950s Blewbury has become an attractive place for people commuting to work in the area, or even in London. The old cottages have been improved and extended, and a number of estates have been built. Until about 1970 there were several racing stables in the village; one is still in business a mile to the south, and several racehorse gallops on the Downs to the south of Blewbury are still in use.

== Secular buildings ==
Blewbury has a number of historic timber-framed buildings. There is a cruck cottage in South Street. Hall Barn may date from about 1660. William Malthus was a London merchant who left land at Noke, Oxfordshire to fund a school at Blewbury. Its five-bay Queen Anne style school building close to St Michael's church was built in 1709. Also near St Michael's church are two almshouses. Nikolaus Pevsner states that the first was built in 1738 for the oldest man in the village and the second was added on its centenary in 1838. However, Page and Ditchfield state that there are two cottages that one James Bacon founded in 1747. Blewbury Mill (near to East Hagbourne) on Mill Brook is said to be where blotting paper was accidentally invented. Turnpike House in the village was a toll house on the Wantage to Streatley turnpike.

== Transport ==
Thames Travel route 94 serves Blewbury from Mondays to Fridays, linking the village with Didcot town and with Didcot Parkway railway station. Buses run mostly once an hour, with a half-hourly service in the evening peak. There is no Saturday or Sunday service.

== Notable people ==
In the 20th century the village attracted a number of notable artists and writers. Writers have included Elizabeth Ferrars, Dick Francis (from 1954 to 1980), Kenneth Grahame, Marguerite Steen, GB Stern, Barbara Euphan Todd and Ben Fergusson. Artists have included William Nicholson, father of abstract painter Ben Nicholson, Susan Beatrice "Trissy" Pearse, illustrator of children's books, including Amelia Anne series, H Davis Richter known for much-reproduced interiors and Eli Marsden Wilson. The tradition continues, and keen amateur artists received direction from the late professional artists Roy East and Ron Freeborn. The village used to have an art gallery devoted to the work of local artists.

== Performing arts ==
Every two years or so, the village puts on a festival with various shows, dances, and exhibitions in many of the old houses as well as a walk along the path of the Millbrook as it threads its way through many private gardens. The village has a theatrical tradition. There is an open-air theatre in the grounds of Orchard Dene house with capacity for an audience of 250, where productions are performed each summer. These involve amateur actors and back stage workers under professional direction. There are also theatrical events put on in the Village Hall.

About every five years since 1978, the village has commissioned a new opera for amateur performance. This has been performed in St Michael's church. The earlier operas attracted media attention, including a one-hour television film about The Snow Queen in 1982. More recent productions have had less attention. The productions were not widely seen, since once St Michael's has been adapted for the large cast and orchestra, there is room for only about 120 in the audience each night. In April 2009, there was a new production of Benjamin Britten's Noye's Fludde. In 2012 or so, it was planned to revive the first of Blewbury's commissioned operas Sir Gawain and the Green Knight by the composer Richard Blackford, who now lives in the village.

== Gallery ==
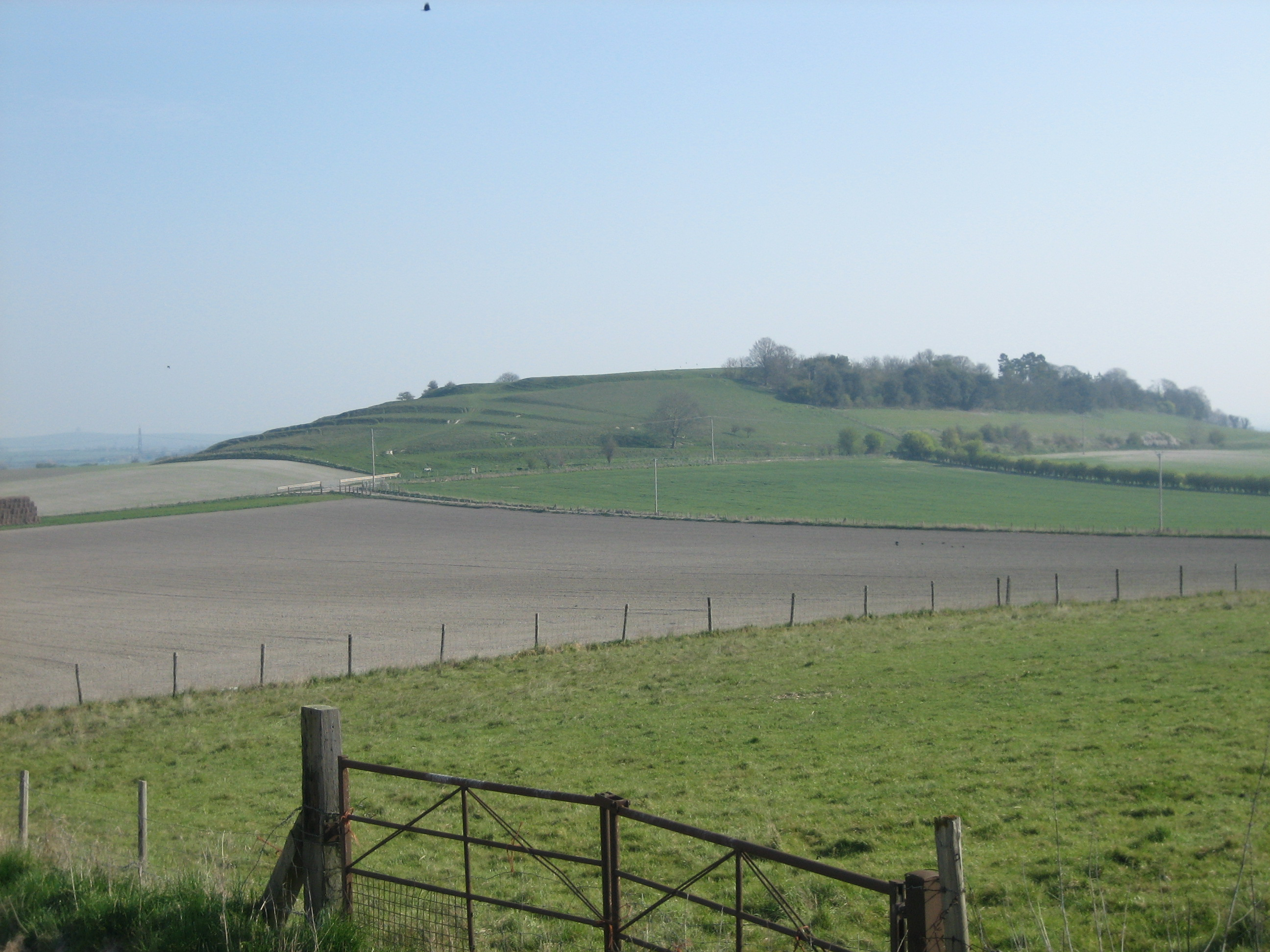
Blewburton Fort

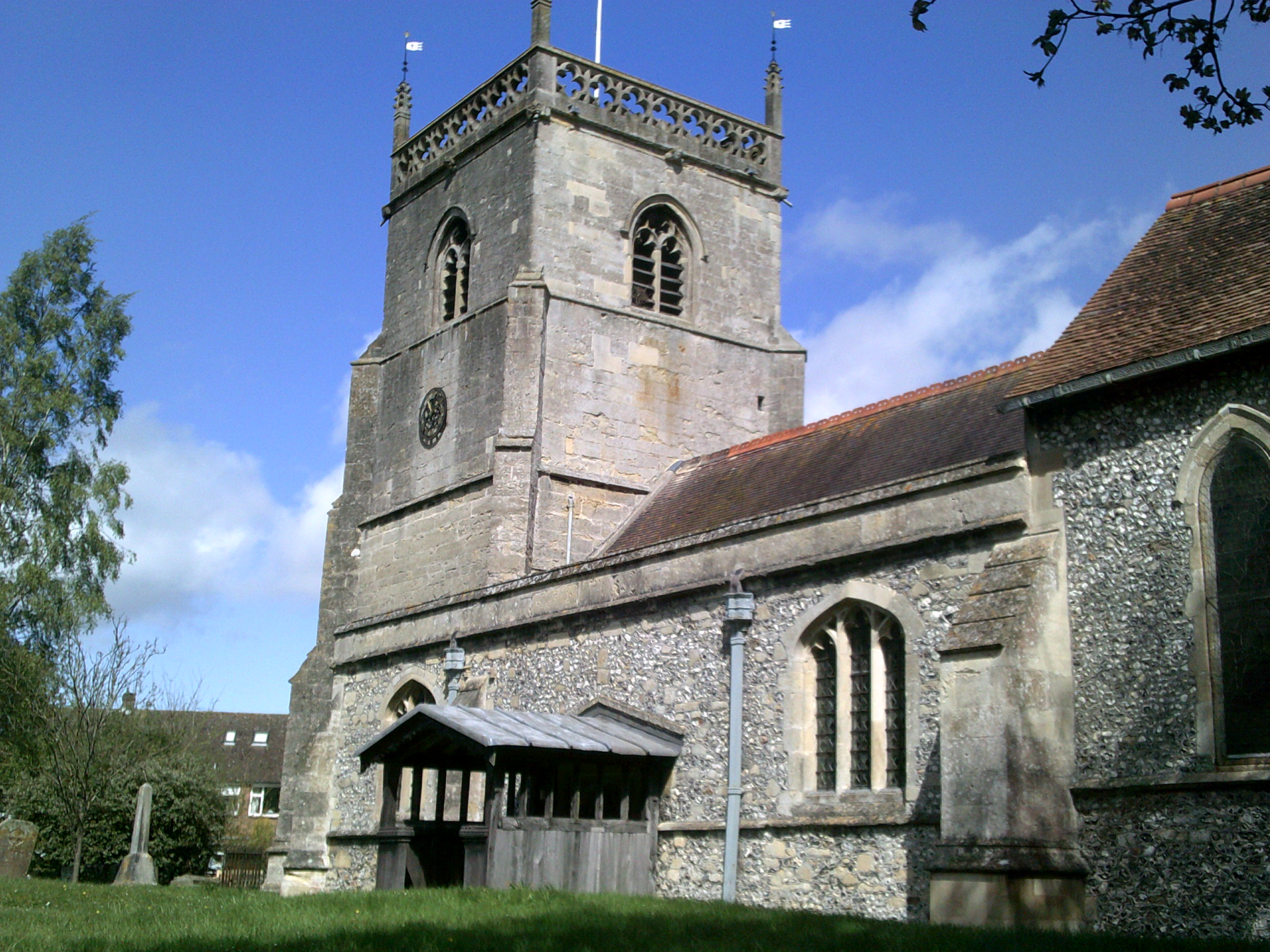
St Michael's 15th-century west tower and 13th-century south aisle

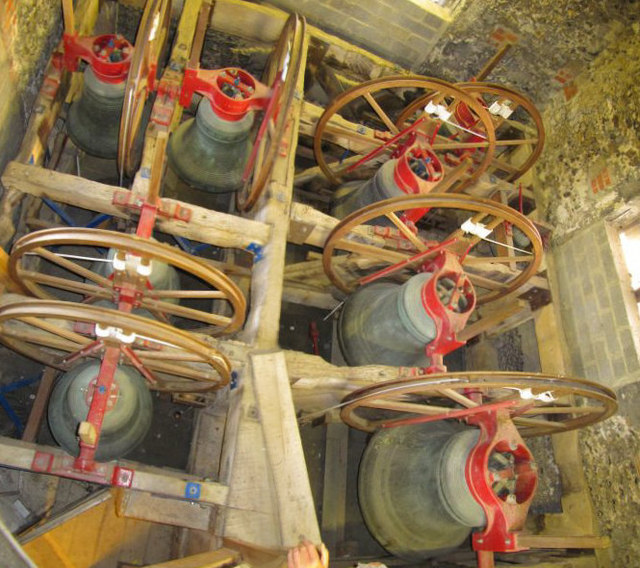
Bells in St Michael's west tower

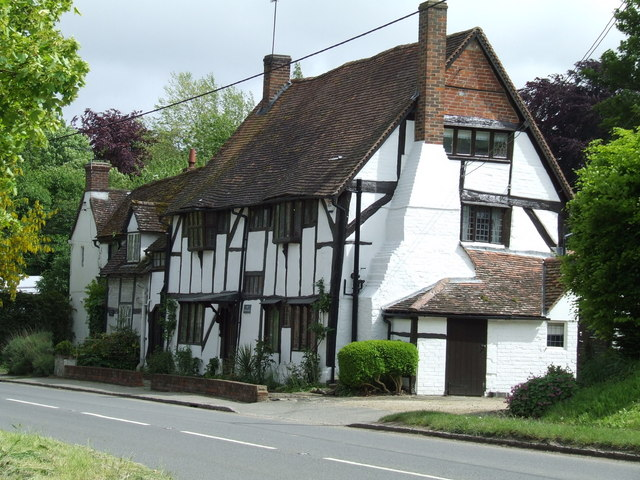
Blewbury House, a timber-framed house in the village

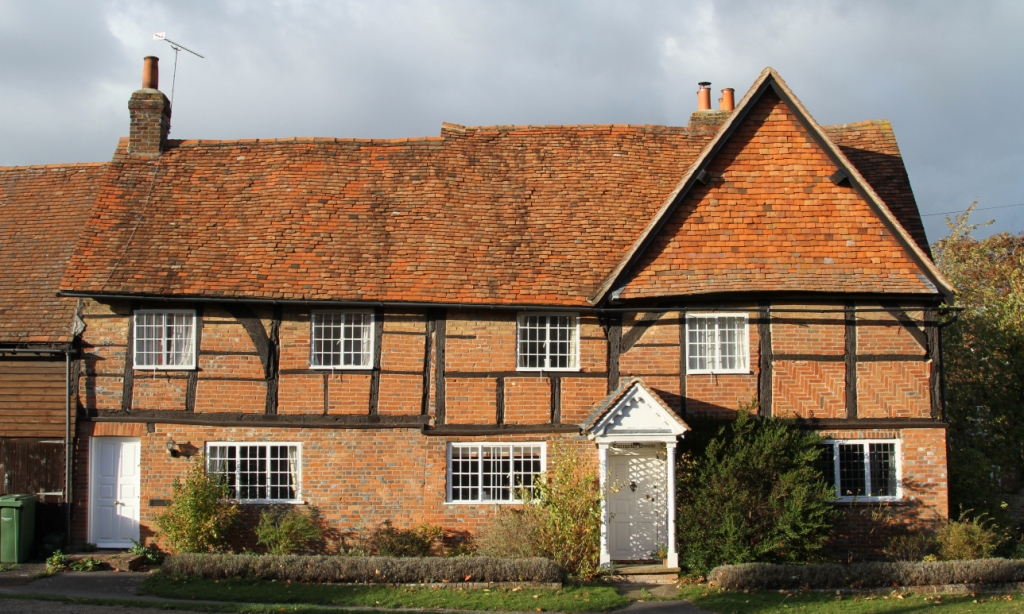
Turnpike House, a timber-framed 17th-century house on London Road

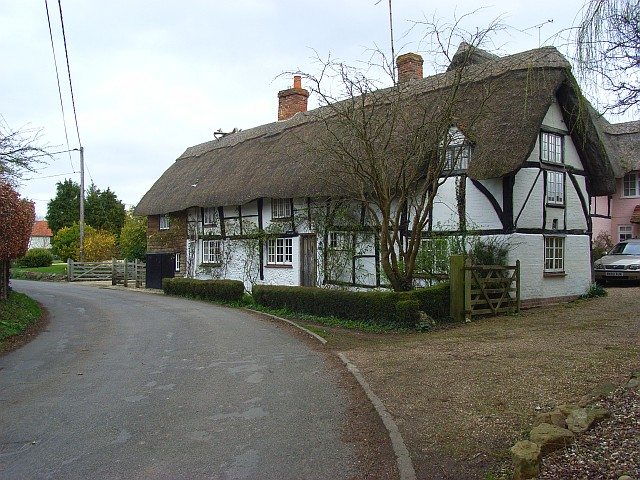
Dragonwyke, a timber-framed 16th-century thatched cottage

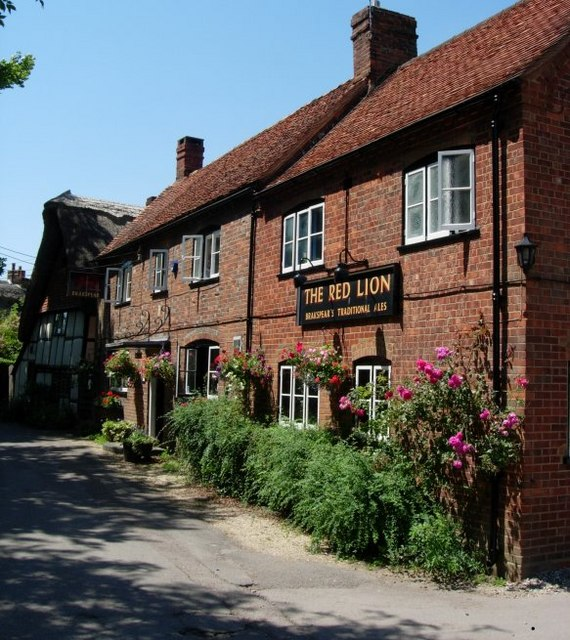
The Red Lion public house

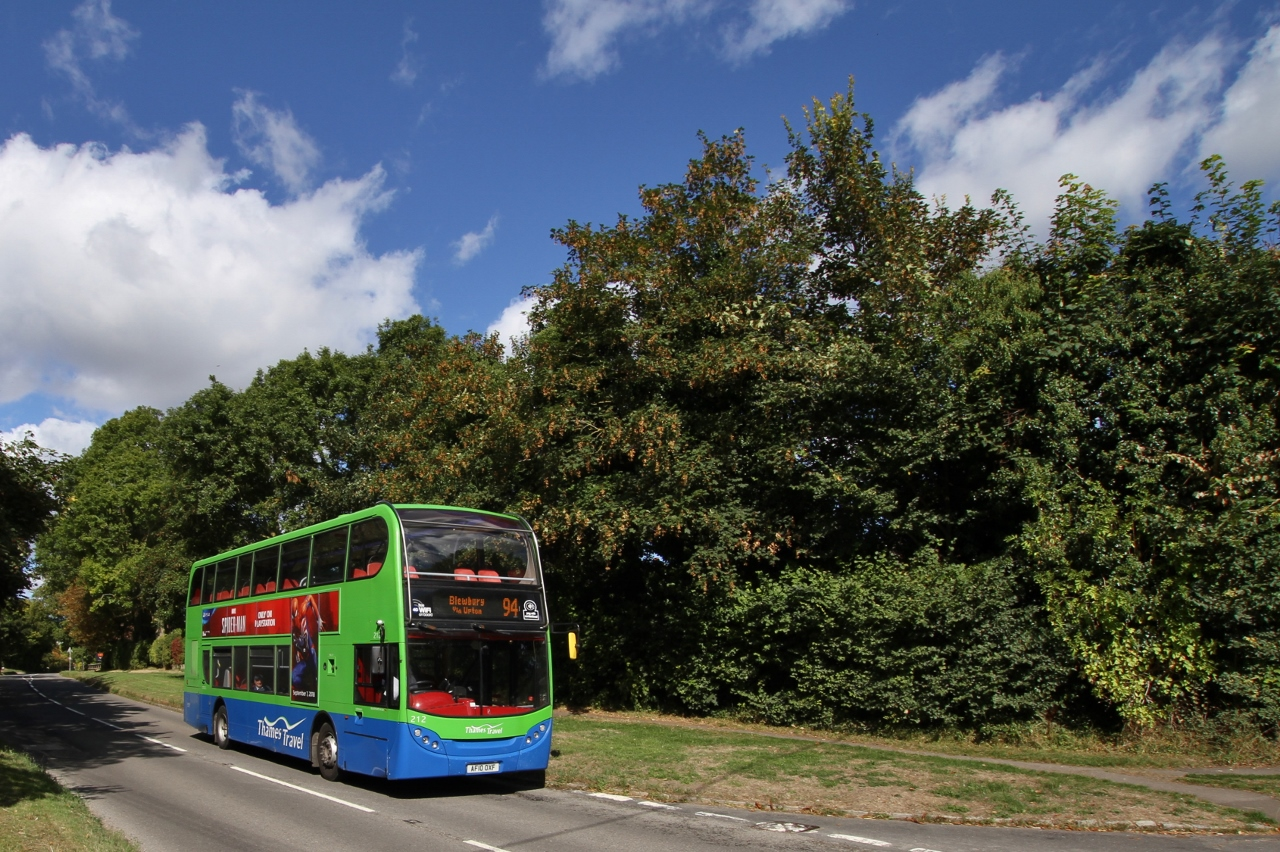
A Thames Travel bus on route 94 on the A417 London Road arriving in Blewbury

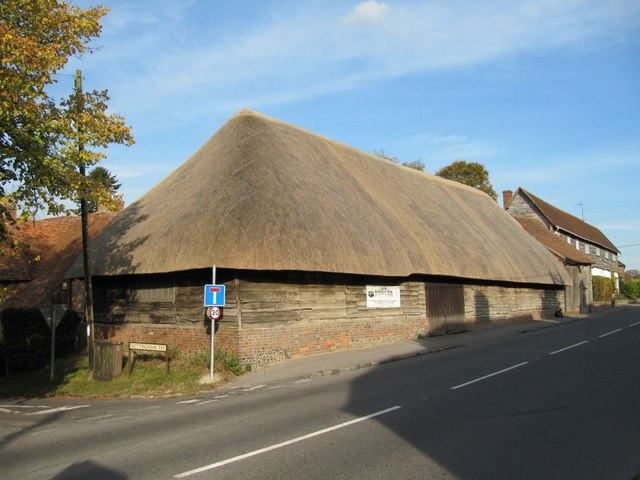
Great Tree Farm Barn, a weatherboarded and thatched 17th-century barn on London Road

== Bibliography ==
- Greenway, Diana E, ed. (1991). Fasti Ecclesiae Anglicanae 1066–1300. Vol. 4, Salisbury. London: Oxford University Press for the Institute of Historical Research. pp. 53–55.
- Horn, Joyce M, ed. (1962). Fasti Ecclesiae Anglicanae 1300–1541. Vol. 3, Salisbury Diocese. London: Oxford University Press for the Institute of Historical Research. pp. 36–38.
- Northeast, Peter (1992) [1981]. This Venerable Village. Blewbury: Blewbury Local History Group. ISBN 0950479454.
- Page, WH; Ditchfield, PH, eds. (1923). "Blewbury". A History of the County of Berkshire. Victoria County History. Vol. III. assisted by John Hautenville Cope. London: The St Katherine Press. pp. 280–291.
- Pevsner, Nikolaus (1966). Berkshire. The Buildings of England. Harmondsworth: Penguin Books. pp. 90–92.
- Swanson, Jean; James, Dean (2003). The Dick Francis Companion. New York: Berkley Prime Crime. p. xiii. ISBN 0425181871. OCLC 52269585.
