= Aston Upthorpe =

Village & civil parish in South Oxfordshire

Coordinates: 51.574°N 1.205°W

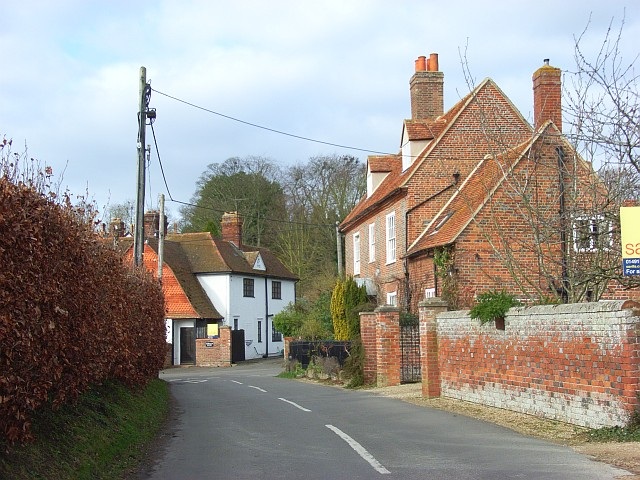
- Thorpe Street, Aston Upthorpe

- Location within Oxfordshire
- Area: 4.74 km^{2} (1.83 sq mi)
- Population: 179 (2011 Census)
  - Density: 38/km^{2} (98/sq mi)
- OS grid reference: SU5586
- Civil parish: Aston Upthorpe
- District: South Oxfordshire
- Shire county: Oxfordshire
- Region: South East
- Country: England
- Sovereign state: United Kingdom
- Post town: Didcot
- Postcode district: OX11
- Dialling code: 01235
- Police: Thames Valley
- Fire: Oxfordshire
- Ambulance: South Central
- UK Parliament: Didcot and Wantage
- Website: The Astons.Net

Aston Upthorpe is a village and civil parish about 3 miles (5 km) southeast of Didcot in South Oxfordshire. It was part of Berkshire until the 1974 boundary changes transferred it to Oxfordshire. The motion picture National Lampoon's European Vacation (1985) - Stonehenge Scene was filmed a mile to the south of the village on the ancient downland. The 2011 Census recorded the parish's population as 179.

== Prehistory ==
Half of the 360 foot (110 m) high Blewburton Hill is in the parish. The hill is the site of an Iron Age hill fort that may have been occupied from the 4th century BC to the 1st century BC.

== Parish church ==
The Church of England parish church of All Saints may date from the second half of the 11th century. However, the only surviving Norman features are one small window in the north wall of the nave and the blocked-up remains of a south doorway. The nave roof may be 14th century and its west wall and Perpendicular Gothic window may be 15th century. The wooden north porch is of uncertain date, possibly the first half of the 17th century. In 1859–60 under the direction of the Gothic Revival architect P.C. Hardwick, the nave was restored and the chancel was restored. The bellcote is also wooden and has two bells, and may have been added by Hardwick. All Saints is now part of the Benefice of the Churn.

== Sources ==
- Page, W.H.; Ditchfield, P.H., eds. (1923). A History of the County of Berkshire. Victoria County History. Vol. 3. assisted by John Hautenville Cope. London: The St Katherine Press. pp. 280–291.
- Pevsner, Nikolaus (1966). Berkshire. The Buildings of England. Harmondsworth: Penguin Books. p. 74.
