= Aston Tirrold =

Village in Oxfordshire, England

Coordinates: 51.570°N 1.198°W

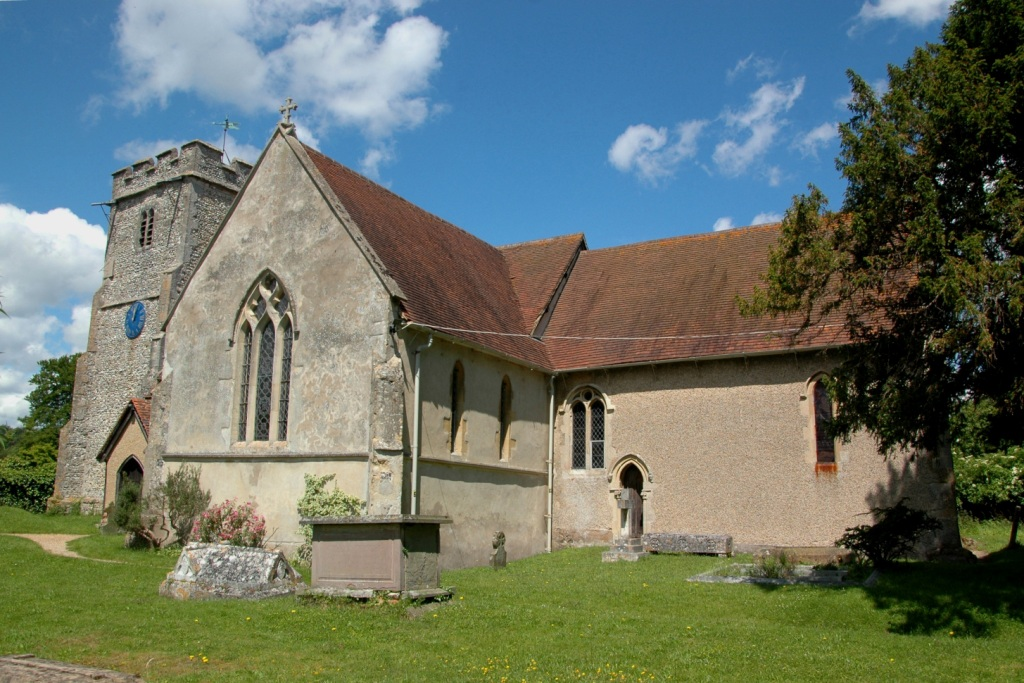
- St Michael and All Angels parish church

- Location within Oxfordshire
- Area: 7.69 km^{2} (2.97 sq mi)
- Population: 373 (2011 Census)
  - Density: 49/km^{2} (130/sq mi)
- OS grid reference: SU5586
- Civil parish: Aston Tirrold
- District: South Oxfordshire
- Shire county: Oxfordshire
- Region: South East
- Country: England
- Sovereign state: United Kingdom
- Post town: Didcot
- Postcode district: OX11
- Dialling code: 01235
- Police: Thames Valley
- Fire: Oxfordshire
- Ambulance: South Central
- UK Parliament: Didcot and Wantage
- Website: The Astons.net

Aston Tirrold is a village and civil parish at the foot of the Berkshire Downs about 3 miles (5 km) southeast of Didcot. It was part of Berkshire until the 1974 boundary changes transferred it to Oxfordshire. The 2011 Census recorded the parish's population as 373.

== Toponym ==
"Aston" is a common toponym derived from the Old English for "east town". It evolved via Eston and Extona in the 11th century and Eston in the 13th century before becoming Aston before the beginning of the 14th century. "Tirrold" began as Torald, Thorold and Thurroll in the 15th and 16th centuries, and the name was run together as Austenthorold in the 16th century. A Nicholas son of Torold held the manor in 1166.

== Churches ==
=== Church of England ===
There may have been a church on the site of the Church of England parish church of Saint Michael since the Saxon period, as the north aisle has a square-headed doorway that may date from this period. The doorway is clearly not in its original position, as it links the 19th century north aisle with the vestry. The church is a Grade II* listed building. The Norman south doorway is 11th century. The nave and chancel were also Norman, built in the 12th century, but the chancel was rebuilt in the Early English Gothic style in the first half of the 13th century. The priest's doorway and lancet windows survive from this time. The south transept is also from the first half of the 13th century but was remodeled in the first half of the 14th century. The Decorated Gothic east window of the chancel is also 14th century.

Page and Ditchfield thought that the bell tower was from the first half of the 13th century. However, it is Perpendicular Gothic which suggests it is no earlier than the middle of the 14th century. St Michael's used to have a rood loft. It was removed, presumably during the English Reformation, and the stairs are now blocked. The upper and lower doorways to the stairs are late Perpendicular Gothic. In 1863 the church was restored and the Gothic Revival north aisle was added. The aisle has three bays designed in a 14th-century style. The organ loft was added in 1910 but includes a 15th-century Perpendicular Gothic window that may have come from the north wall of the nave when the north aisle was built.

The tower has a ring of six bells. The third bell was cast in about 1599, probably at Salisbury in Wiltshire. Joseph Carter of Reading, Berkshire cast the second bell in 1603. Henry I Knight of Reading cast the fourth bell in 1617 and Ellis I Knight cast the fifth bell in 1639. Lester and Pack of the Whitechapel Bell Foundry cast the tenor bell in about 1769. Mears and Stainbank, also of the Whitechapel Bell Foundry, cast the treble bell in 1937. There is also a Sanctus bell, cast by an unidentified foundry in about 1499. St Michael's is now part of the Benefice of the Churn.

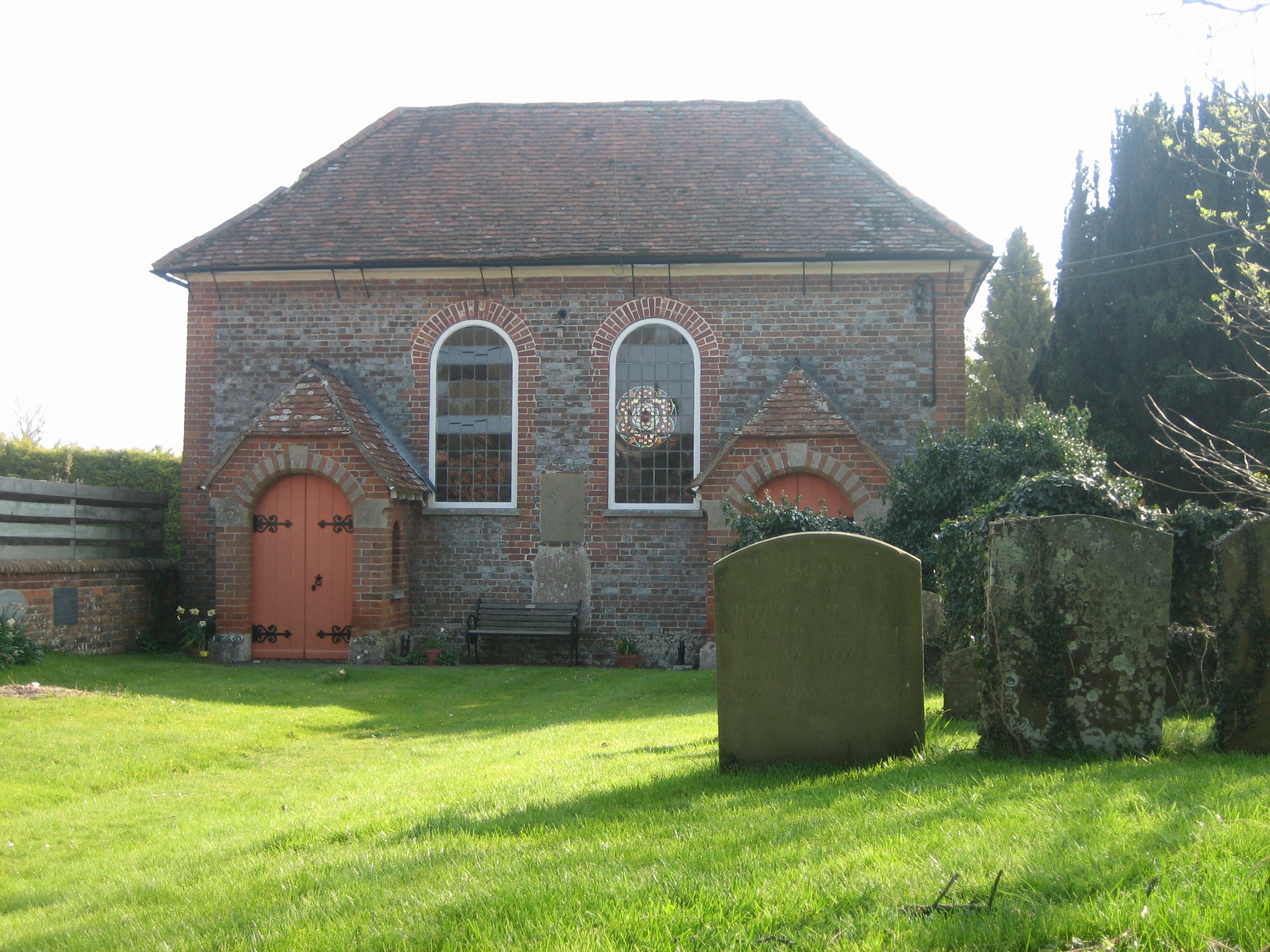
Aston Tirrold United Reformed Church

=== United Reformed Church ===
A Presbyterian congregation was established in the area shortly after the Act of Uniformity 1662, from which date two local dissenting clergymen, Thomas Cheesman, formerly vicar of East Garston, and Richard Comyns, formerly vicar of Cholsey, preached to congregations meeting in barns and in the open air. A Society of Dissenters had been founded at Aston Tirrold by 1670. Aston Tirrold Presbyterian chapel is a Grade II listed Georgian building of 1728. It is built of blue and red brick, has two arched windows and a hipped roof. From 1841 until 1845 its minister was Thomas Keyworth, author of Principia Hebraica. It is now Aston Tirrold United Reformed Church

== Amenities ==
The former public house in the village, the Chequers Inn, is now The Sweet Olive gastropub.

== Notable people ==
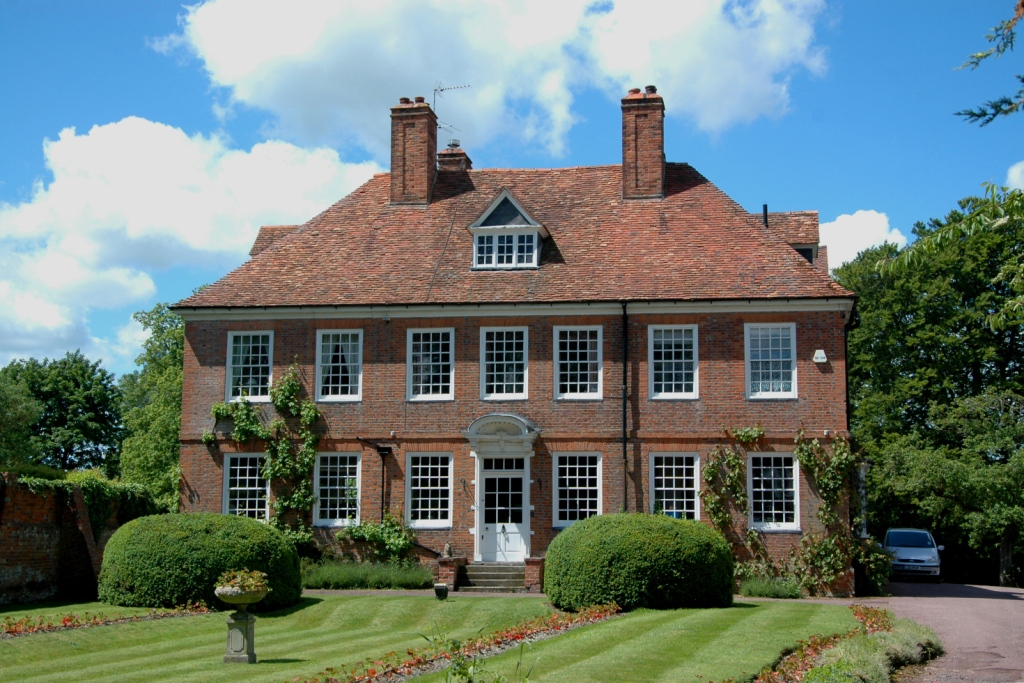
Aston Tirrold's 17th-century manor house

The musician Steve Winwood and the other members of his rock band Traffic (Jim Capaldi, Dave Mason, and Chris Wood) lived at a country cottage near Aston Tirrold in the late 1960s and wrote much of the Mr. Fantasy album there. Other visitors included Stephen Stills and Pete Townshend. Subsequently the guitarist Eric Clapton and drummer Ginger Baker, previously of Cream, visited, which led to the formation of the short-lived rock band Blind Faith. Steve Winwood left the cottage in 1969, but returned for a BBC Four documentary screened in June 2010 and June 2013. In 2003 the tennis player Tim Henman bought a property valued at £2 million at the edge of the village.

== Sources ==
- Clapton, Eric; Sykes, Christopher Simon (2007). Eric Clapton: The Autobiography. London: Century. pp. 114–115. ISBN 978-1-84605-160-9.
- McDonald, Frances (1978). Monument to Faith: A history of Aston Tirrold Reformed Church. Aston Tirrold.
- Page, W.H.; Ditchfield, P.H., eds. (1923). A History of the County of Berkshire. Victoria County History. Vol. 3. assisted by John Hautenville Cope. London: The St Katherine Press. pp. 280–291.
- Pevsner, Nikolaus (1966). Berkshire. The Buildings of England. Harmondsworth: Penguin Books. pp. 73–74.
