= Church of St Leonard, Bledington =

Church in Gloucestershire, England

Coordinates: 51.9009°N 1.6453°W

Church of St Leonard
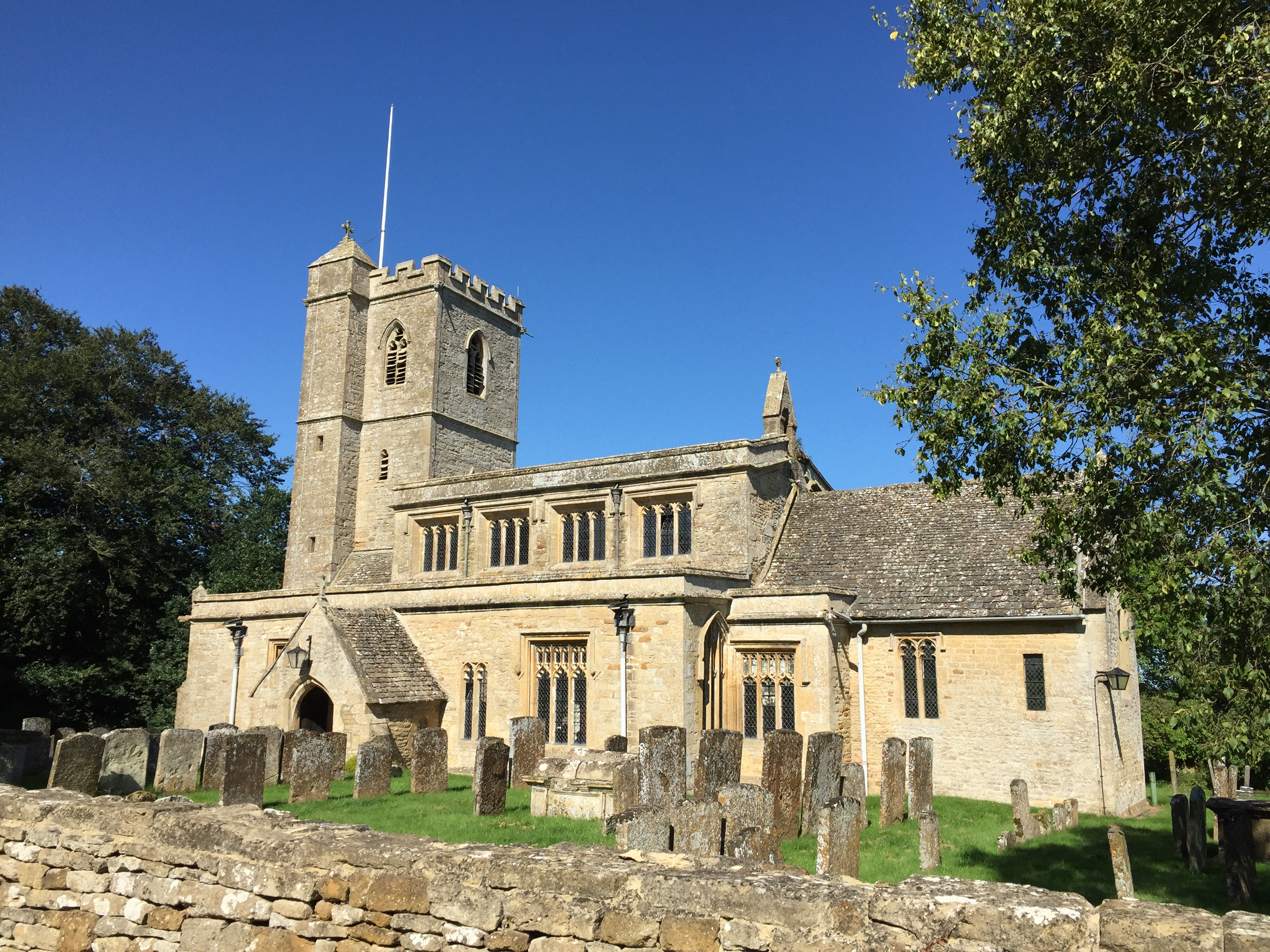

- Location within Gloucestershire
- Denomination: Church of England

Architecture
- Heritage designation: Grade I listed building
- Designated: 25 August 1960

Administration
- Province: Canterbury
- Diocese: Gloucester
- Parish: Bledington

The Anglican Church of St Leonard at Bledington in the Cotswold District of Gloucestershire, England, was built in 12th century. It is a grade I listed building.

== History ==
The church was built in the 12th century and lavishly rebuilt in the 15th century, though it retains earlier parts, and the 15th-century painted glass surviving in some of the windows is a notable feature.

The earliest known reference to a church in Bledington is in a confirmation dated 1175 by Pope Alexander III to Winchcombe Abbey of all its churches. The east and west walls of the nave are said to be from this era.

The main rebuilding in the late 15th century included the raising of the nave roof, the insertion of a clerestory and parapets, and the refenestration of the nave and aisle. Most of the new windows were square-headed, with Perpendicular tracery, and five have canopied image brackets in each reveal. A recess with a three-light window was built leading from the south-west corner of the chancel into an archway to the south aisle. The 15th-century south doorway, with moulded arch and head stops, retains part of its early door. In 1548 Somerset, the Lord Protector, acting on behalf of the boy king Edward VI, ordered that all imagery should be removed from churches, and by 1650 St Leonards had lost its rood screen and window statues. The hidden remains of the earlier wall decorations are now partially visible, including a stretch of masonry pattern enriched with rosettes and heart-shaped petals dating from the 14th century on the west wall of the chancel and a late medieval figure, in black outline, of a crowned female saint with long hair on the east wall of the nave.

The building was in a very poor state by the mid-19th century. It was restored in 1881 by J. E. K. Cutts and again by F.E. Howard c.1923. The pews were replaced in 1904, but some 15th-century bench ends with decorative blind tracery were retained.

The ecclesiastical parish includes both Bledington and the hamlet of Foscot in Oxfordshire and forms part of the Evenlode Vale benefice of the Anglican Church, within the Diocese of Gloucester. The patronage remains with the Dean and Chapter of Christ Church.

== Architecture ==
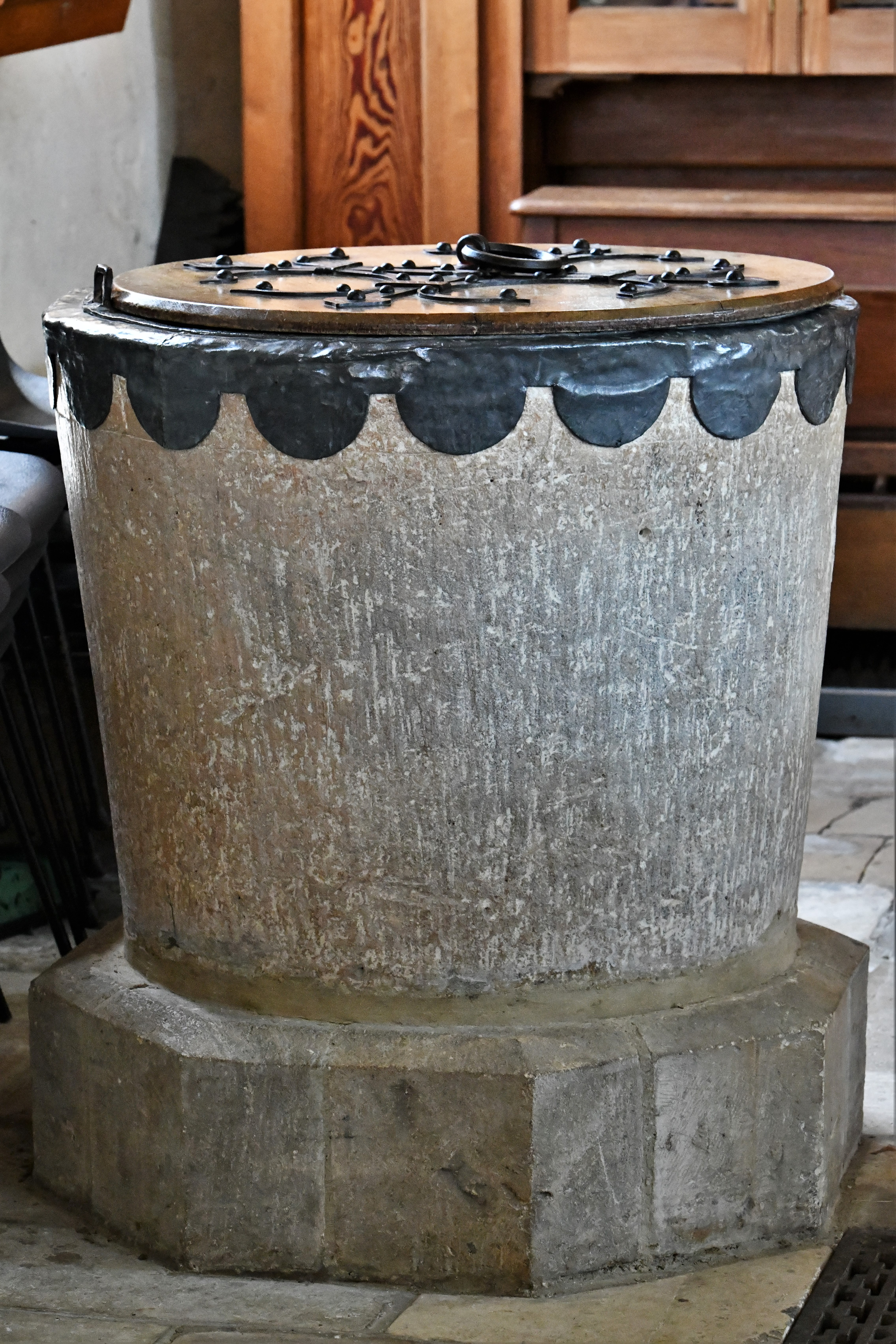
12th-century tub-shaped font

The building is of stone, with roofs of lead and of Cotswold stone, and comprises a chancel with a sanctus bell-cot, clerestoried nave, south aisle, south porch, and embattled west tower.

The chancel, the nave arcade of three bays, and the south porch were built in the 13th century, and some new windows were added in the 14th century. Subsequently, a three-stage tower with an external vice was erected: the west wall of the nave serves as the base of the west wall of the tower and arches within the nave support the other walls of the tower. There are five 17th-century bells and a sixth dated 1811. One bell cast in 1639 bears the inscription We are the bells of Bledington and Charles is our King.

The eight windows of the north wall of the nave and the recessed window in the south wall of the chancel were filled with contemporary painted glass. The glass survives, in some cases as fragments pieced together, but in others as nearly complete panels. It has been suggested that it was made by John Prudde of Westminster, glazier of the similar windows in the Beauchamp chapel in Warwick. Some of the inscriptions and names of donors can still be seen, one dated 1470.

The tub-shaped font is 12th-century, the communion rails and altar table are 17th-century, and beside the 20th-century pulpit is an ancient wrought-iron hourglass stand.

In the churchyard is a war memorial to soldiers from the village.
