= Murder of James Young =

1848 murder case in Scotland

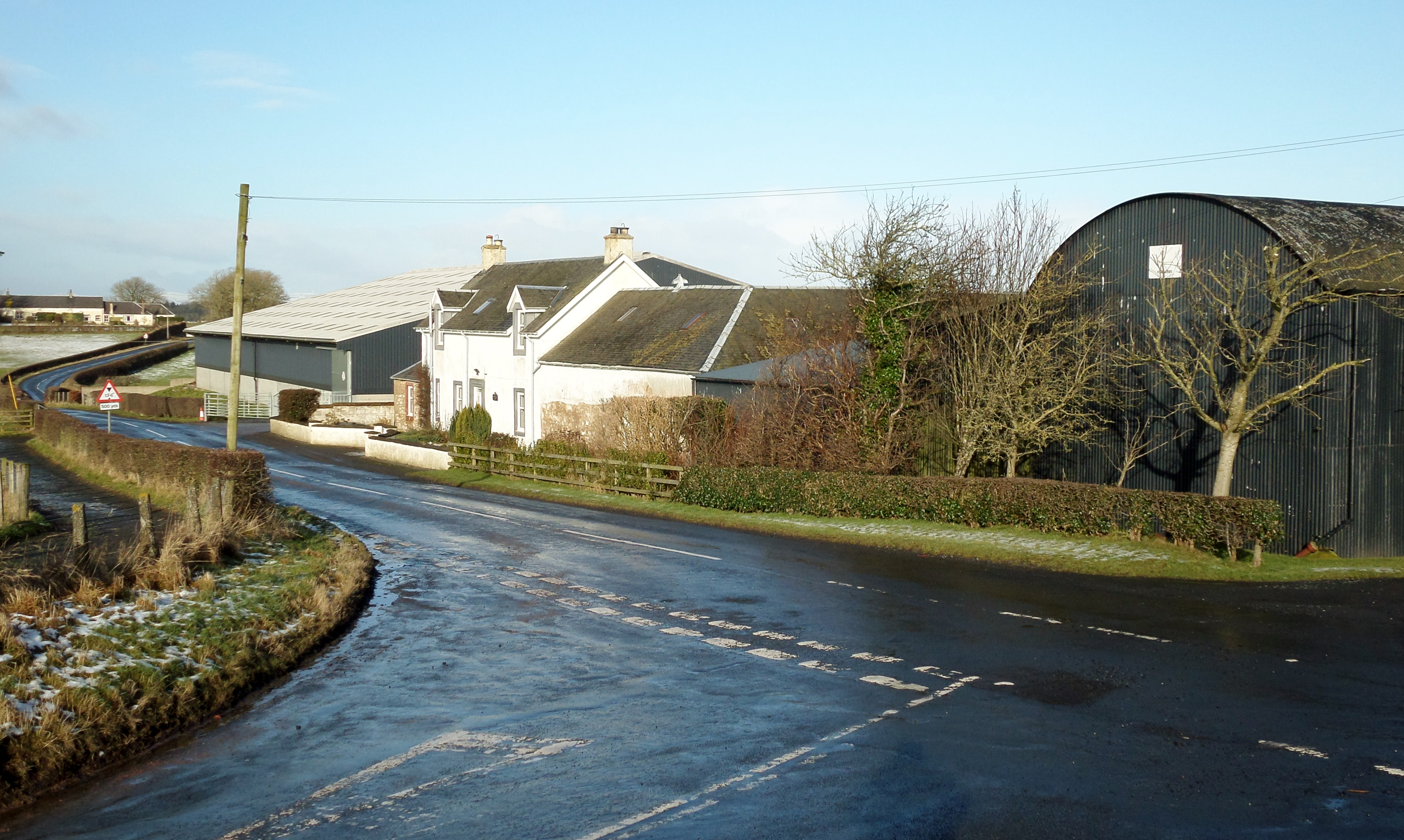
- Fort Acres Farm where James Young worked
- Born: Riccarton, Ayrshire, Scotland
- Died: Quoted as 16 or 18; Country lane near Fortacres Farm, Riccarton, Ayrshire
- Cause of death: Blood loss due to stab wound
- Body discovered: At 4am by two young men
- Occupation: Farm labourer

Notes
- Murdered by James McWeelan or McQueen

The teenager James Young was murdered on or near Blackhill Road close to Fortacres Farm (NS 39820 34337), Gatehead, Parish of Dundonald in Ayrshire by James McWheelan also recorded as James McQueen on Friday 26 or the early hours of Saturday 27 May 1848. The site is recorded in one report as being "on or near" the Toll Road leading from the Fortacres Farm Toll Bar. The parishes boundaries of Symington, Dundonald and Riccarton, Ayrshire meet in this area.

The name James McWheelan will be used for the sake of consistency.

== The suspect ==
James McWheelan (probably aged 32) was Irish, from Dublin, a gardener at Ardrossan for several years, later an employee at the Glengarnock Iron Works and described at the trial as a "...rather good looking, stoutly built man.." who firmly declared himself to be 'Not Guilty' at the trial.

== The murder ==
=== The site ===
The old Fortacres bar and toll house stood close to the junction of the road that leads to Symington and Dundonald. The road takes a right-angled bend and a track ran off towards the nearby Simon's Burn. The site of the murder is known locally as McWheelan's Corner.

=== The act ===
James Young was struck repeatedly "on or near the head" with a stone or similar object by James WcWheelan and then stabbed in the neck with a carpenter's chisel or similar object resulting in his bleeding to death. He was reported to have both hands filled with grass and earth that he had clutched in his death throes. His body had been found by two young men, John Gebbie and John Scott, at about 4am on the Saturday, lying in a pool of blood, with a wound in the neck that had been inflicted with the carpenter's chisel which was found in a nearby field, together with an unusual pink and patterned napkin or handkerchief that was shown to have been recently in the possession of James McWheelan. The men quickly informed the Fortacres farmer (who identified the victim) and Robert Hendry, the toll keeper.

A Mr Robert Thom is recorded as having encountered McWheelan who overtook him at a time that would have allowed for him to have been near Fortacres at the time of the murder.

=== Manhunt and other crimes ===
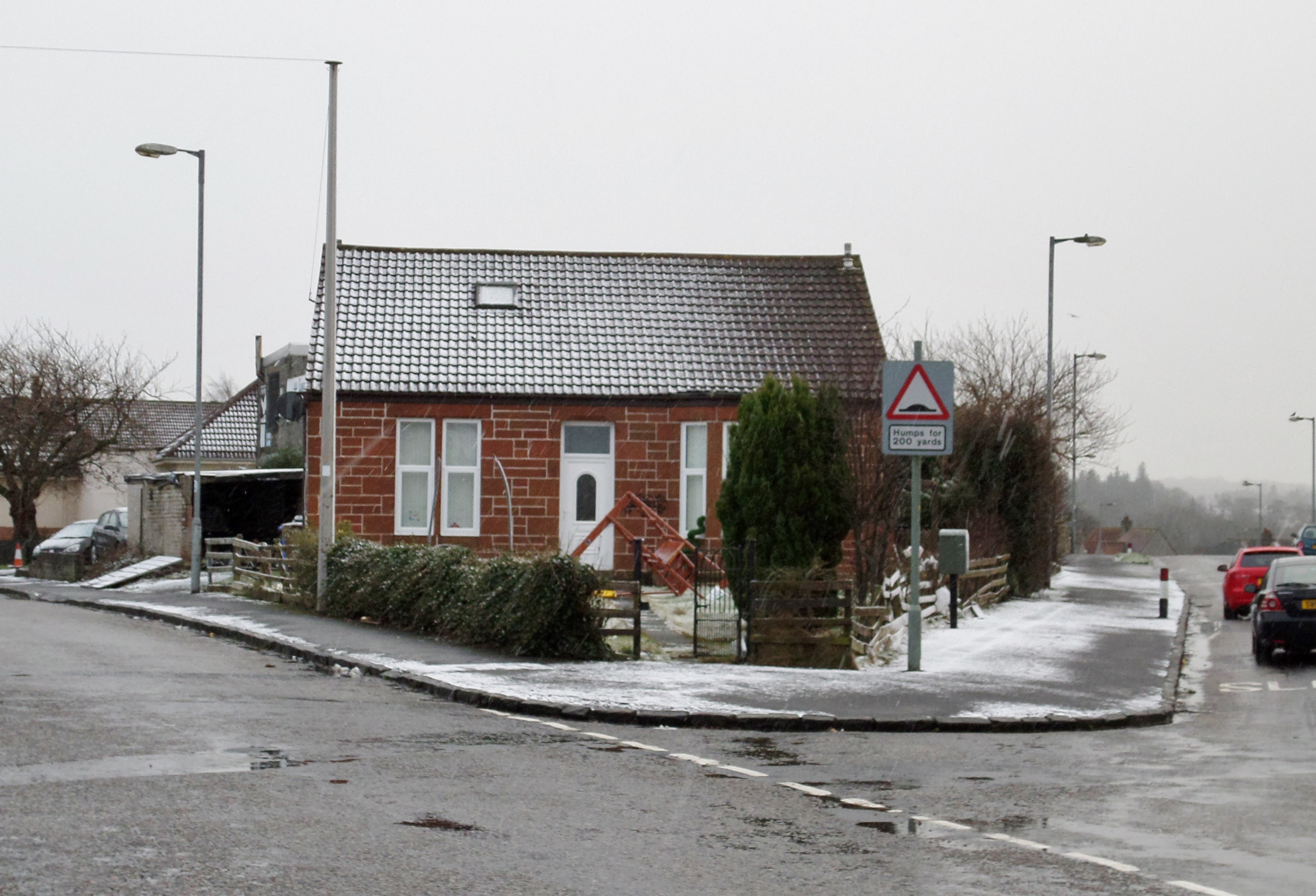
Knowehead Farm site in 2015.

James McWheelan had been seen acting suspiciously in the area the afternoon of the day before the murder and having suddenly disappeared he was a logical suspect. McWheelan's description was circulated to the various police stations throughout the country. McWheelan in the meantime had travelled to Beith, arriving on the Saturday after the murder. He gave a (stolen) silver watch to an acquaintance to pawn, drank the proceeds and the next day set off towards Paisley.

A farmer, William Orr, whilst riding passing a toll-bar between Paisley and Beith on the Sunday, saw McWheelan hurriedly leaving the toll-house having, so it transpired, stolen £35 and a silver watch. Having had his suspicions raised the farmer made enquiries and discovering that a murder and thefts had taken place, turned back, caught up with McWheelan near Paisley and apprehended him, passing him to the police there who quickly discovered his true identity and took him to Kilmarnock. McWheelan was charged with these crimes, the murder and also charged with taking James Young's silver watch, chain, key, etc. and fifteen shillings in silver money (worth at least £73.97 in 2019).

== Background ==
A James Young, son of John Young and Jean Gemmell was born on the 21 July 1831 in the Parish of Riccarton and was baptised on 24 July by the Rev. Moody. He would have been 17 years old in May 1848.

James Young was employed as farm servant by Joseph Smith .at Fortacres Farm, recorded as 'Forty acres' in at least one report. On 'Dudd's-day' the hiring fair was taking place at Kilmarnock and James had gained permission to visit his home at Knowehead in Riccarton. After walking the few miles he arrived at 7am and stayed with John, his father, his mother and family members until around 10.30pm that evening when he set off to return to Fortacres Farm. James however never made it back to his place of work.

It is not recorded exactly why James was carrying as much as '15 shillings in silver', a relatively large sum of money or if the robbery and murder were premeditated or occurred as a result of a random act. Being the Kilmarnock Dudd's-day Fair when hiring etc. of farm labourers etc. took place it would certainly have been a prime opportunity to commit acts of robbery.

The 'Ayr Advertiser' in 1820 stated that "Friday was the “Dudsday” fair in Kilmarnock, that is, the fair at which the country servants spend their former half year's wages in new clothes."

== Trial, sentence and execution ==
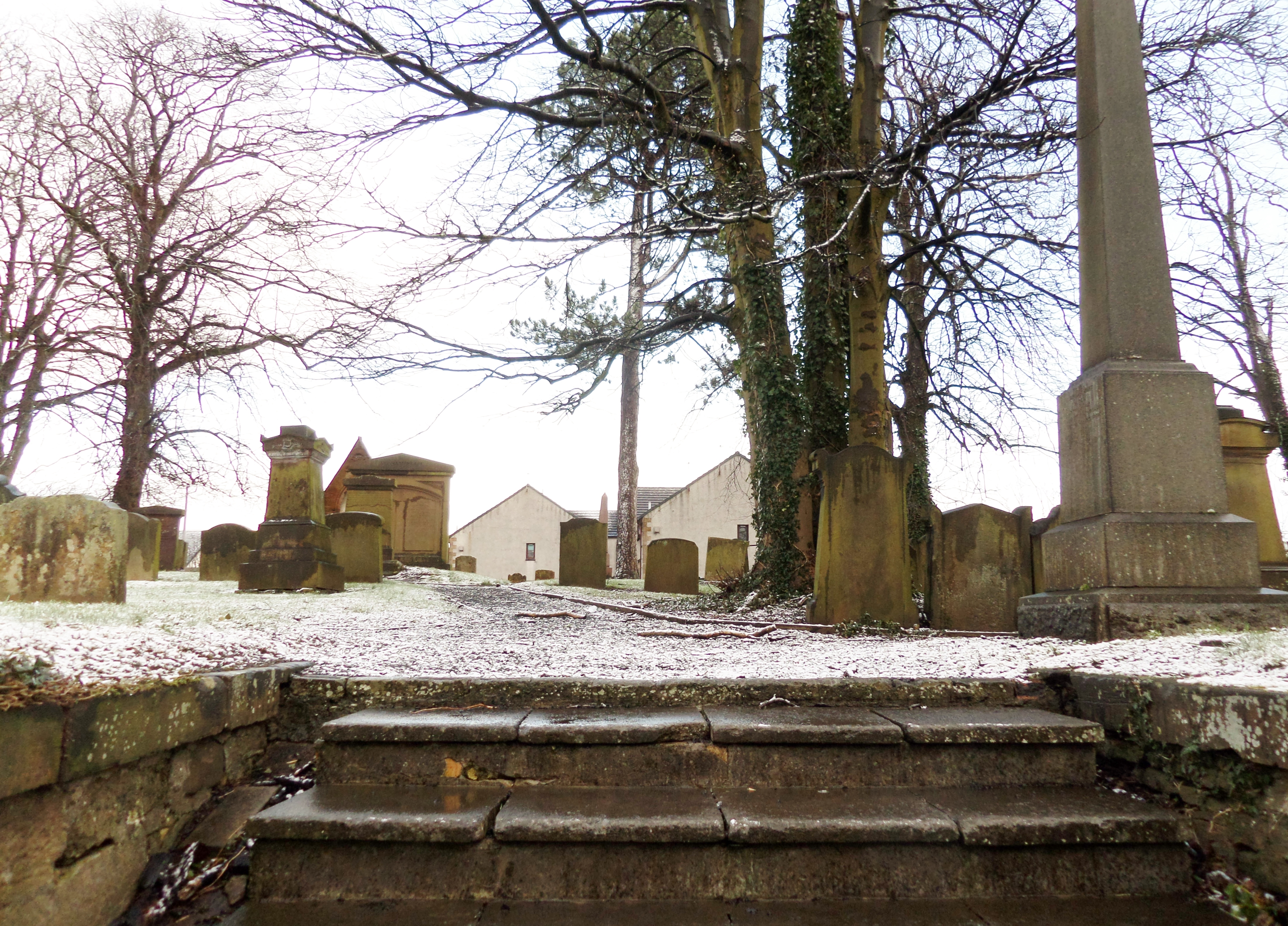
Riccarton parish cemetery.

James McWheelan firmly declared himself to be 'Not Guilty' at the trial held in Ayr and no fewer than 93 witnesses were cited. Great interest had been created due to the "...peculiar barbarity and wantonness of the crime." The chisel, a napkin found on the road and the silver watch belonging to the murdered man were all known to have been in the possession of the accused man. It took the jury only half an hour to return a unanimous verdict of guilty.

John Crawford, a barber in Beith related how James had forced his way to the front of the queue of waiting customers to have his beard shaved off as if to disguise himself.

James McWheelan, aged 32, was sentenced to be hanged in Ayr at 7am on Thursday, 26 October 1848. He repeatedly admitted and retracted his guilt and tried to commit suicide several times.

Two days before the sentence was to be carried out McWheelan became very religious and on the day itself, upon his head being covered with the hood and the rope around his neck, he stood praying beneath the gallows for 15 minutes with no one being quite sure if he should be interrupted as he was supposed to drop a handkerchief to signal that he was ready. The Provost of Ayr finally lost patience and shouted, "Do your duty, executioner." John Murdoch, the hangman, then pulled the lever. He maintained his innocence and died without an admission of guilt for his crimes.

== Aftermath ==
Such was the notoriety of the murder and sympathy for the victim that passers by took to leaving a stone at the spot to create a cairn (NS 39979 34140) that grew to a fairly considerable size. The cairn is no longer apparent as the site has attracted random dumping of various materials over the years.

Adamson's comment in his 'Rambles Round Kilmarnock' was that the cairn ".. marks the spot where one of the most cold-blooded and heartless murders that ever stained the annals of our country."

== See also ==
- Beith
