= Foscote =

Foscote may refer to several places in England:

- Foscott, Buckinghamshire, also known as Foscote
- Foscote, Northamptonshire
- Foscote, Wiltshire

== See also ==
Foscot, Oxfordshire
