= Countryman (magazine) =

British magazine

The Countryman
- The cover of the Spring 1958 edition. Until the late 1950s the cover was green, print-only. The size remained octavo until the 2000s.
- Frequency: Monthly
- Circulation: 23,000
- Founder: J. W. Robertson Scott
- Founded: 1927
- Final issue: November 2023
- Company: Country Publications
- Country: United Kingdom
- Based in: Skipton, North Yorkshire
- Language: English
- Website: www.dalesman.co.uk/magazines/the-countryman-magazine
- ISSN: 0011-0272

The Countryman magazine was published in England from 1927 to 2023.

The magazine was founded in 1927 by J. W. Robertson Scott, who edited it from his office in Idbury in rural Oxfordshire for the first 21 years. He was succeeded as editor by John Cripps, son of Stafford Cripps. The last editor was Lorraine Connolly, at offices in Skipton Castle, North Yorkshire. It was published quarterly until the 1990s, when it became a bimonthly. Finally it was a monthly, with a circulation at its peak of about 23,000.

In the 1950s, it described itself as "A quarterly non-party review and miscellany of rural life and work for the English-speaking world". In 2020 its website said: "The Countryman focuses on the rural issues of today and tomorrow, as well as including features on the people, places, history and wildlife that make the British countryside so special."

In the Winter 1948 issue Field Marshal Wavell wrote a tribute in verse to the magazine's eclecticism, one stanza of which reads:

The ethics of "bundling", the methods of trundling
A wheelbarrow, trolley or pram,
Dogs, badgers and sheep, a girl chimney-sweep,
The way to make strawberry jam;
Dunmow and its flitches, the trial of witches,
The somnambulation of wigeon,
You'll find them all here, with discourses on beer
And maternal lactation in pigeon.

To mark the magazine's 80th birthday, Words from the Countryman, edited by Valerie Porter, a selection of writing from the magazine, along with brief historical notes, was published in 2007. Porter notes that, whereas The Countryman had begun as a magazine principally for and about the farmer and others who live in the country, from the early 1980s until the 2000s it often tended to favour the views of urban-dwellers who take their leisure in the country, many of whom are antagonistic to farmers.

In October 2023 the magazine ceased publication, with November 2023 being the final issue.
