= Parish ale =

Feast in an English parish

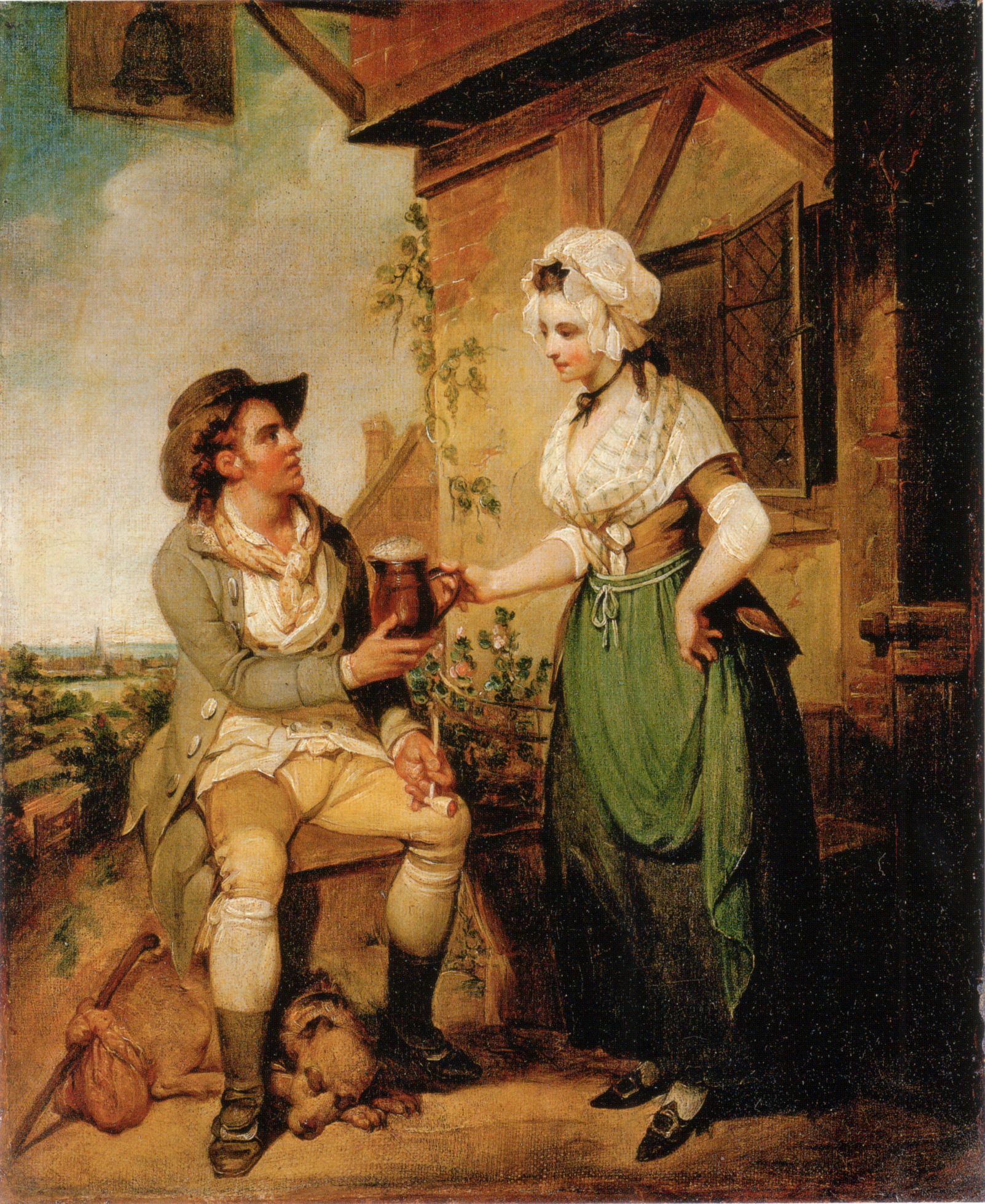
"The Ale-House Door" (Henry Singleton, c. 1790)

The Parish ale or church ale is a party or festivity in an English parish at which ale is the chief drink. It is typically a fundraising occasion for the parish that might include music and dancing. Very common in the later Middle Ages, parish ales encountered some opposition after the English Reformation, and some have survived into modern times in some form.

== Types ==
The word "ale", in the sense of an ale-drinking party, was part of many compound terms for types of party or festivity based on the consumption of ale or beer. Thus there was the leet-ale (held on "leet", the manorial court day); the lamb-ale (held at lamb-shearing); the Whitsun-ale (held at Whitsun), the clerk-ale, the church-ale etc. The word "bridal" originally derives from bride-ale, the wedding feast organised to raise money for the couple. The bid-ale, once very common throughout England, was a benefit feast to which a general invitation was given, and all those attending were expected to make some contribution to help the object of the benefit, usually a poor person or family or some other charitable cause. Morris dancing used to be common entertainment at parish ales, and some groups of Morris dancers still hold an annual feast, called a Morris Ale.

== Significance ==
These parish festivals were of much ecclesiastical and social importance in medieval England. The chief purpose of the church-ale (which was originally instituted to honour the church saint) and the clerk-ale, was to facilitate the collection of parish dues and to make a profit for the church from the sale of ale by the church wardens. These profits kept the parish church in repair, or were distributed as alms to the poor.

The churches must owe, as we all do know,
For when they be drooping and ready to fall,
By a Whitsun or Church-ale up again they shall go
And owe their repairing to a pot of good ale

— "Exaltation of Ale", by Francis Beaumont

In the gallery of the tower arch of St Agnes, Cawston in Norfolk is inscribed:

God speed the plough
And give us good ale enow ...
Be merry and glade,
With good ale was this work made.

On the beam of a screen in the church of Thorpe-le-Soken, Essex, is the following inscription in raised blackletter on a scroll held by two angels: "This cost is the bachelers made by ales thesn be ther med." The date is about 1480.

== Description ==
The feast was usually held in a barn near the church or in the churchyard. In Tudor times church-ales were held on Sundays; gradually the parish-ales were limited to the Whitsun season, and these still have local survivals. The colleges of the universities used to brew their own ales and hold festivals known as college-ales; some of these ales are still brewed and famous, like "chancellor" at Queen's College, and "archdeacon" at Merton College, Oxford, and "audit ale" at Trinity, Cambridge.

A short piece printed in the Manchester Times in 1870 quoted from Jefferson's Book about the Clergy:

Of the Church-ale, often called the Whitsun-ale, from being generally held at Whitsuntide, it is necessary to speak at greater length, for it is a far more important institution than the bid-ale or clerk-ale. The ordinary official givers of the church-ale were two wardens who, after collecting subscriptions in money or kind from every one of their fairly well-to-do parishioners, provided a revel that not infrequently passed the wake in costliness and diversity of amusements. The board, at which everyone received a welcome who could pay for his entertainment, was loaded with good cheer; and after the feasters had eaten and drunk to contentment, if not to excess, they took part in sport on the turf of the churchyard, or on the sward of the village green. The athletes of the parish distinguished themselves in wrestling, boxing, quoit throwing; the children cheered the mummers and the morris dancers; and round a maypole decorated with ribbons, the lads and lasses plied their nimble feet to the music of the fifes, bagpipes, drums and fiddles. When they had wearied themselves by exercise, the revellers returned to the replenished board; and not seldom the feast, designed to begin and end in a day, was protracted into a demoralising debauch of a week's or even a month's duration. The Manchester Times

== See also ==
- Carnival
- Charter fair
- Dudsday - traditional Scottish festival day
- Kermesse
- Merry England#Origins and themes – further historical context and legacy
- Patronal festival
- Whitsun - traditional English day of fairs/festivals
- Frühschoppen - beer-drinking session for the church-goers in Germany and Austria
