= J. W. Robertson Scott =

British journalist and author (1866–1962)

J.W. Robertson Scott in 1947

John William Robertson Scott CH (born in Wigton, Cumberland on 20 April 1866, died Idbury, Oxfordshire on 21 December 1962) was a British journalist and author, best known for his writings on rural affairs, and a Member of the Order of the Companions of Honour.

== Family ==
His father was David Young Crozier Scott (1844–1887), a commercial traveller and advocate of temperance, and his mother was Janet Robertson (1843–1905). He was partly educated in Quaker schools and his parents attended Quaker and non-conformist worship.

When a child, his family moved to Carlisle and then Birmingham, when his father became head of the Independent Order of Good Templars.

He married Elspet Keith, a writer and oriental scholar, in 1906. They had no children.

== Career ==
After freelancing for various publications including the Manchester Guardian, he received a staff position on the Birmingham Gazette but left when he indicated he would not write any articles supporting the Conservative Party or its causes.

In 1887 he started work at the Pall Mall Gazette under W. T. Stead and later Edward T. Cook, following Cook to the Westminster Gazette in 1893. In 1899 he moved to the Daily Chronicle but resigned over his opposition to the Boer War, which his proprietors supported.

As a result, he moved to the country, Great Canfield in Essex, and began to write on rural matters for the Country Gentleman, World's Work and The Field. He produced numerous books and articles, setting out country life for readers in towns and cities.

He moved to Japan for a few years after the outbreak of World War I. He returned in 1922 and becoming involved with the National Federation of Women's Institutes.

In 1923 he moved to Idbury, Oxfordshire, in the Cotswolds. There he founded the journal The Countryman, which he edited until 1947, despite selling it in 1943. He aimed to inform towns people of the realities about rural life, believing knowledge of these topics was fundamental to living a good life. He was also involved in local government and housing policy. He was a magistrate and a county councillor and for many years a committee member of the advisory committee of the Ministry of Health.

== Books ==
His best-selling book was England's Green and Pleasant Land (1925) "a scorching condemnation of the agricultural workers' conditions of life" which described problems with rural housing. Despite its harsh portrait, it did much to promote an idea of rural life as idyll in England. There was a second edition in 1931 and a revised and extended edition in 1947.

He also wrote The Foundations of Japan based on his travels to the Orient.

== Awards ==
He was made a Member of the Order of the Companions of Honour in 1947 and received an honorary MA from Oxford University in 1949.
