= Bould =

Hamlet in Oxfordshire, England

Coordinates: 51.887°N 01.647°W

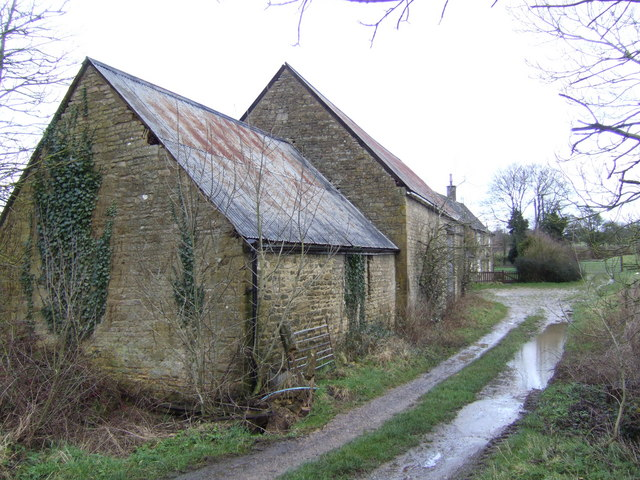
- Lower Farm, Bould

- Location within Oxfordshire
- OS grid reference: SP2420
- Civil parish: Idbury
- District: West Oxfordshire
- Shire county: Oxfordshire
- Region: South East
- Country: England
- Sovereign state: United Kingdom
- Post town: Chipping Norton
- Postcode district: OX7
- Police: Thames Valley
- Fire: Oxfordshire
- Ambulance: South Central
- UK Parliament: Witney

Bould is a hamlet in Idbury civil parish, Oxfordshire, about 4.5 miles (7.2 km) southeast of Stow-on-the-Wold in neighbouring Gloucestershire. The hamlet is near the Bould Wood.
