= John Prudde =

English glass painter

John Prudde (died 1460 or 1461) was the leading English glass painter of the mid 15th century. He held the office of King's Glazier from 1440 until his death. He worked on a variety of high-profile projects, both public and private, but the only work of his now known to survive is in the Beauchamp Chapel of St Mary's Church, Warwick. This has been described as having "a glittering effect unmatched within the British Isles", the result of his mastery of the technically demanding art of inserting brightly-coloured "jewels" of painted glass into the middle of panes of glass.

== Life ==
Prudde first appears in the historical record in 1426/7; at that point he was employed at Westminster Abbey, and Westminster was to remain his home for the rest of his life. In September 1440 he was named as King's Glazier, a post which gave him the use of the "glasiers logge" or "shedde" in Westminster Palace, a gown at Christmas, and wages of 12 pence a day. It also raised his profile, attracting prestigious and well-paying commissions he could fulfil in a private capacity. It is known that he worked at Eton parish church, Eton College, Greenwich Palace, Shene Palace, and the Beauchamp Chapel at St Mary's Church, Warwick, while payments to his servants by All Souls College, Oxford and Winchester College suggest that Prudde himself was involved there. He died in 1460 or 1461. His widow, Elizabeth, took the veil as an Augustinian nun at Holywell Priory, Shoreditch, and in 1472 became prioress there.

== The Beauchamp Chapel ==
The windows for the Beauchamp Chapel were Prudde's best-documented and now most acclaimed work; it is also believed to have been the most expensive glazing project in 15th-century England. The chapel was intended to be the mausoleum of Richard Beauchamp, 13th Earl of Warwick (1382–1439), and the Earl's executors drew up in 1447 a contract, a transcript of which still survives, defining the lines on which the glazing was to be conducted. This contract makes it clear that Prudde was to work from small-scale designs provided for him, from which larger copies would need to be made before being recopied onto glass. It also specified that he should use high-quality European glass, not English, and that the colours should be rich and varied rather than soft-hued, as was more normal in English painted glass of the period. Prudde accordingly used "jewels" of richly coloured glass, some of which were separately leaded while others were inserted into holes which had been carefully drilled through the glass – a difficult and time-consuming operation – and then leaded in. He used this technique on a larger scale than can be found in any other English glass of the period, giving the Beauchamp Chapel windows, according to the art historian Richard Marks, "a glittering effect unmatched within the British Isles". It influenced much Midland painted glass of later date, where the jewelling technique became especially common. One particularly notable feature of the designs is the array of angelic musicians, showing perhaps the largest and most varied collection of musical instruments on English medieval glass; another is the scrolls in the north window bearing 15th-century musical notation. Prudde's glass originally filled all of the windows, but only some have survived to the present day, and of these the main lights have been moved to the east window. The tracery of the west window is filled with fragments of glass recovered from windows that were destroyed by fire in 1694. The tracery of the south window has been heavily restored, but that of the north window and all of the east window is in something very close to its original condition.

== Other possible surviving works ==
No other extant windows can be attributed to Prudde with any certainty. It has been suggested that the saints under canopies in the antechapel at All Souls College, Oxford, and some fragments at Fromond's Chantry, Winchester College may be by him. Prudde can be connected to both of those locations by contemporary documents, but in others the attribution rests purely on stylistic evidence. Richard Marks considers the heraldic glass at Ockwells Manor, near Cox Green, Berkshire, to be probably his work. St Leonard's Church, Bledington, Gloucestershire has windows containing the pieced together remains of medieval painted glass, including some complete panels, which have been tentatively attributed to Prudde. Nathaniel Westlake proposed that the Tree of Jesse window in St Margaret's Church, Margaretting, Essex was by Prudde, but more recently it has been suggested in the Buildings of England series that it was probably the work of some local craftsman. Prudde has also been named as possibly responsible for the "Royal" window in the north-west transept of Canterbury Cathedral on the basis of supposed similarities to the Beauchamp Chapel windows, though Madeline H. Caviness found this argument unconvincing.

== Gallery ==
Details from the north and east windows of the Beauchamp Chapel

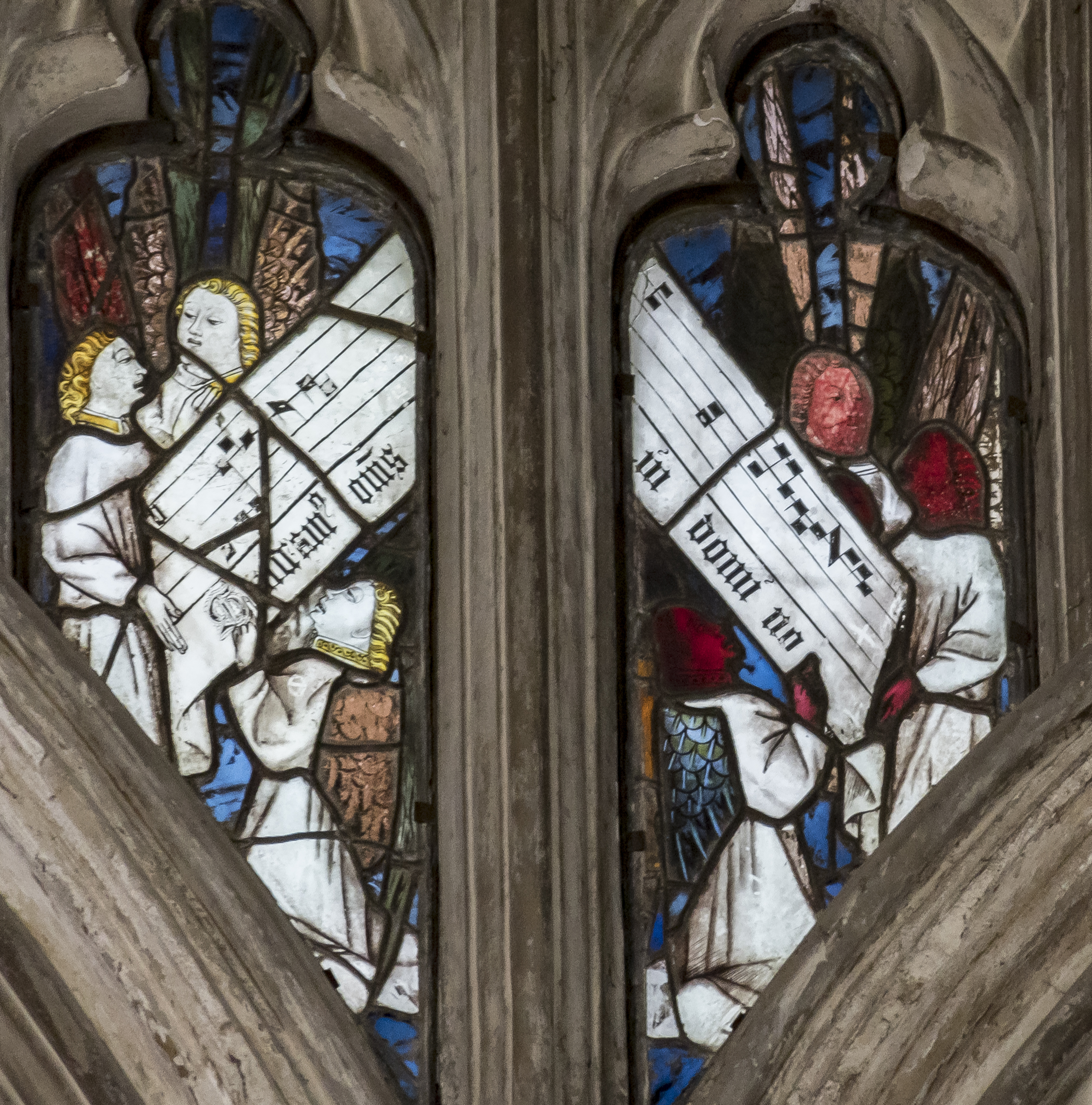

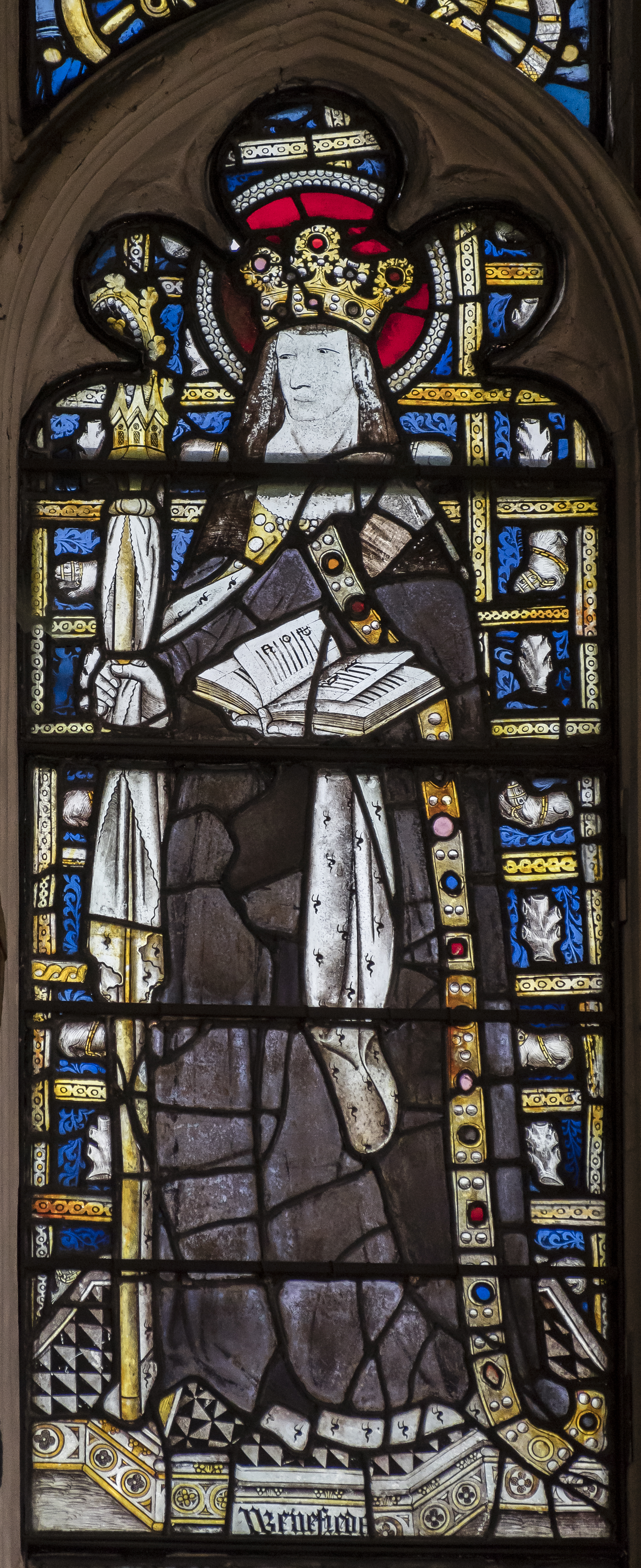

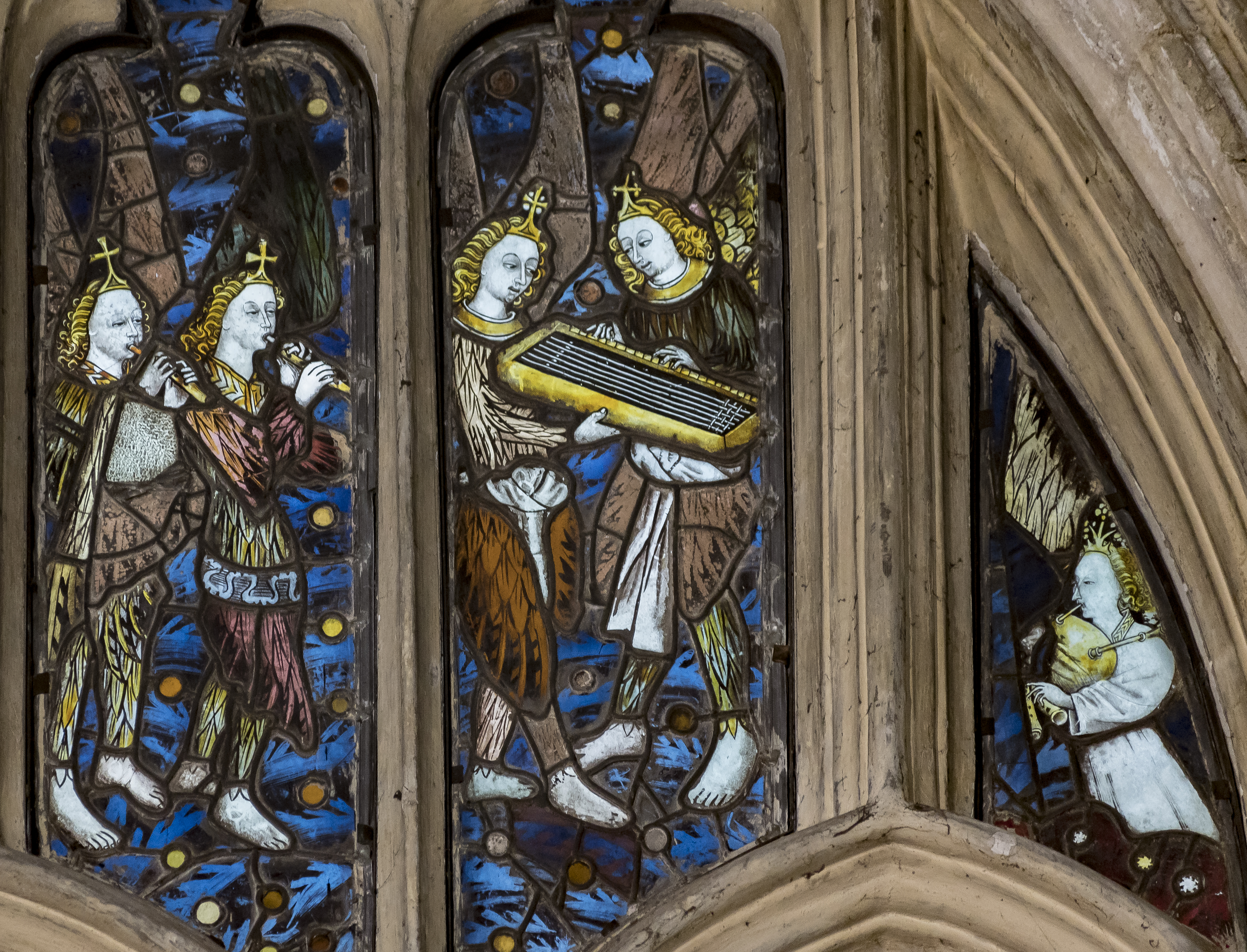

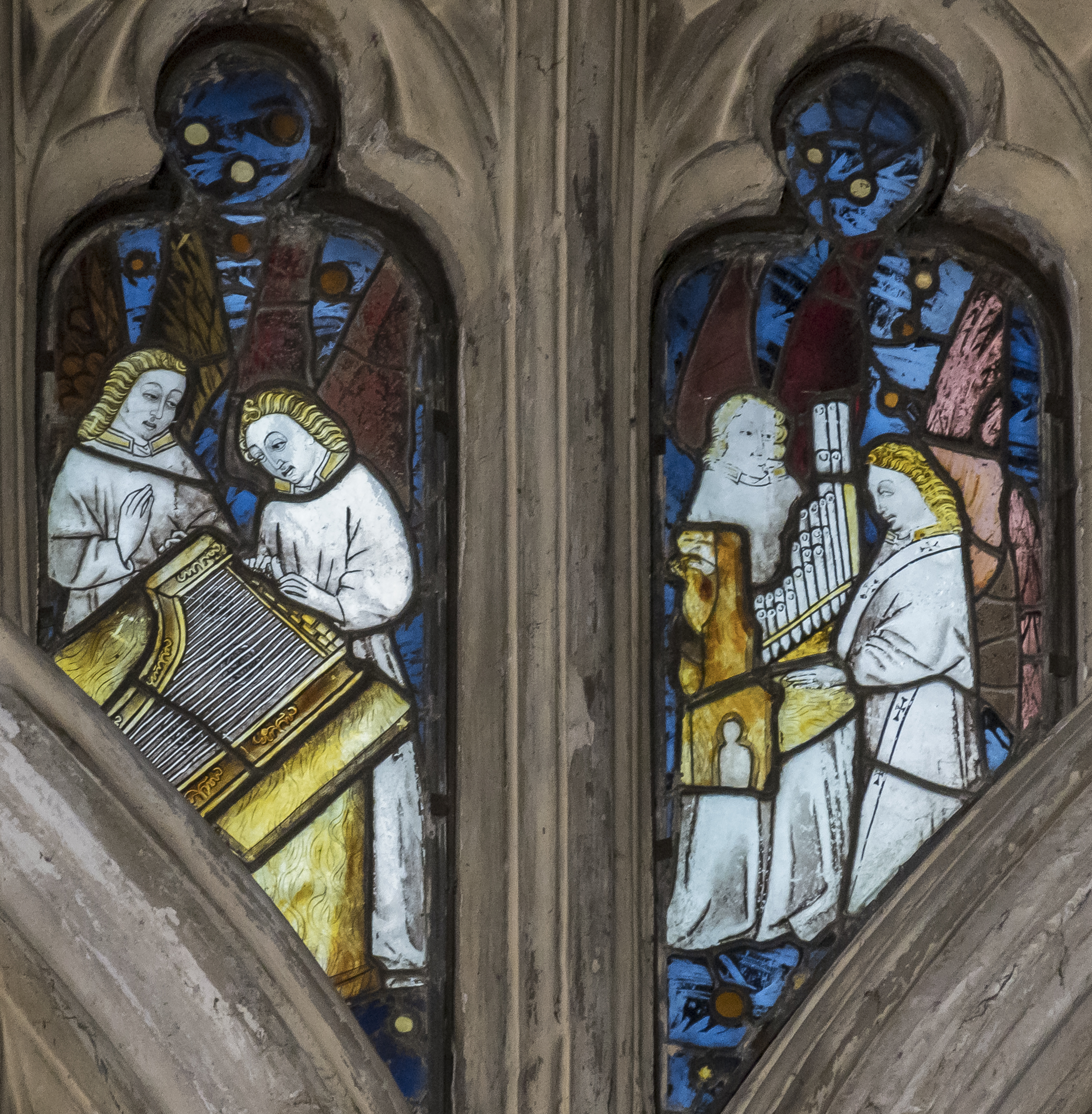

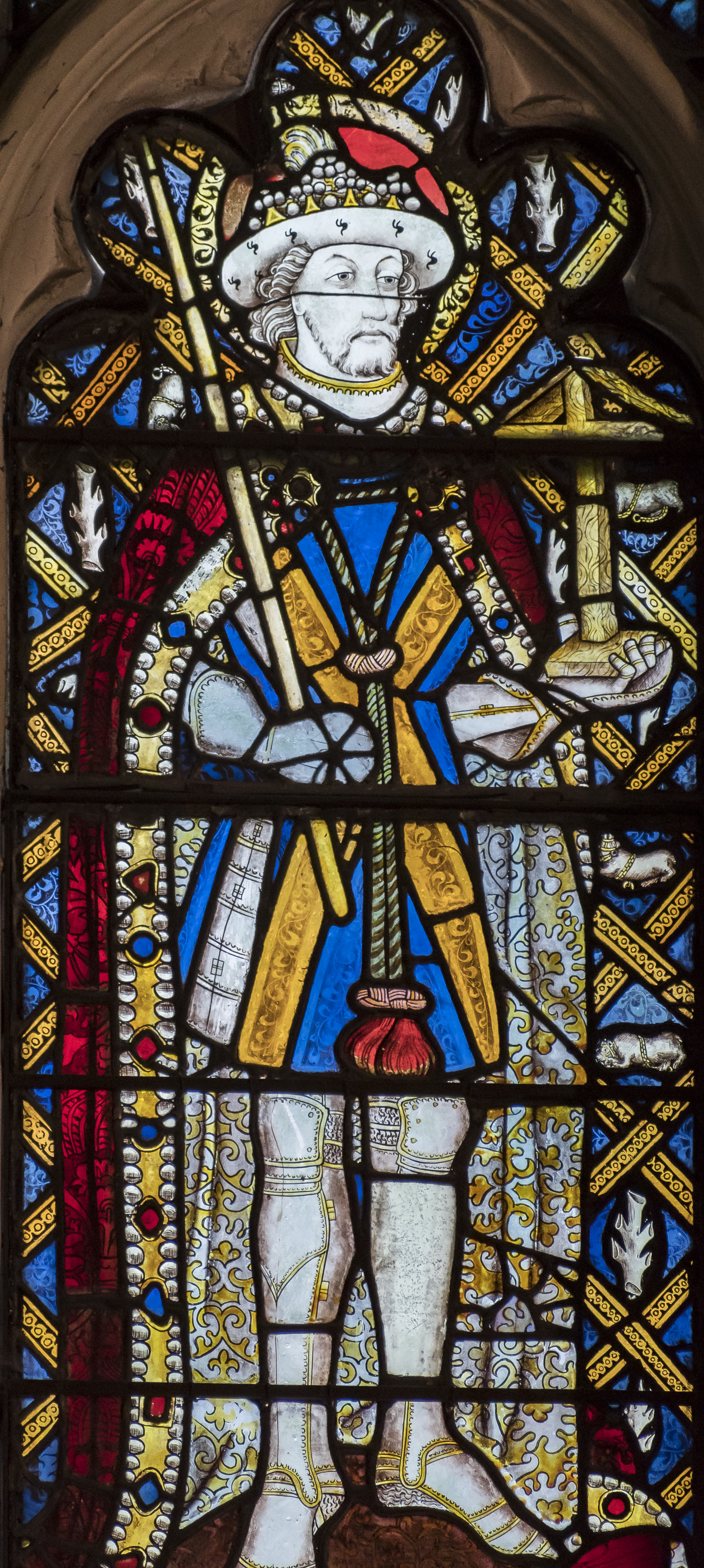

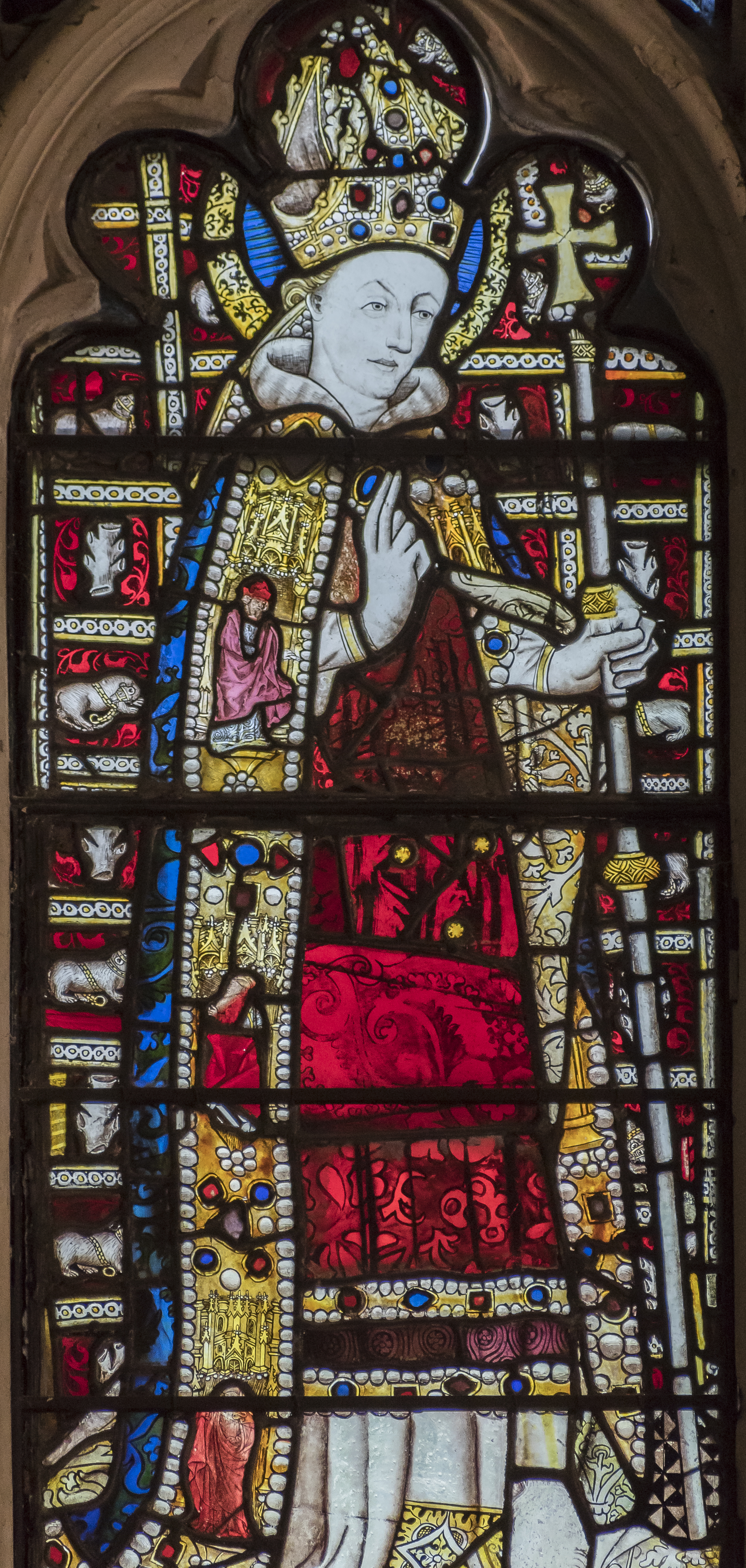

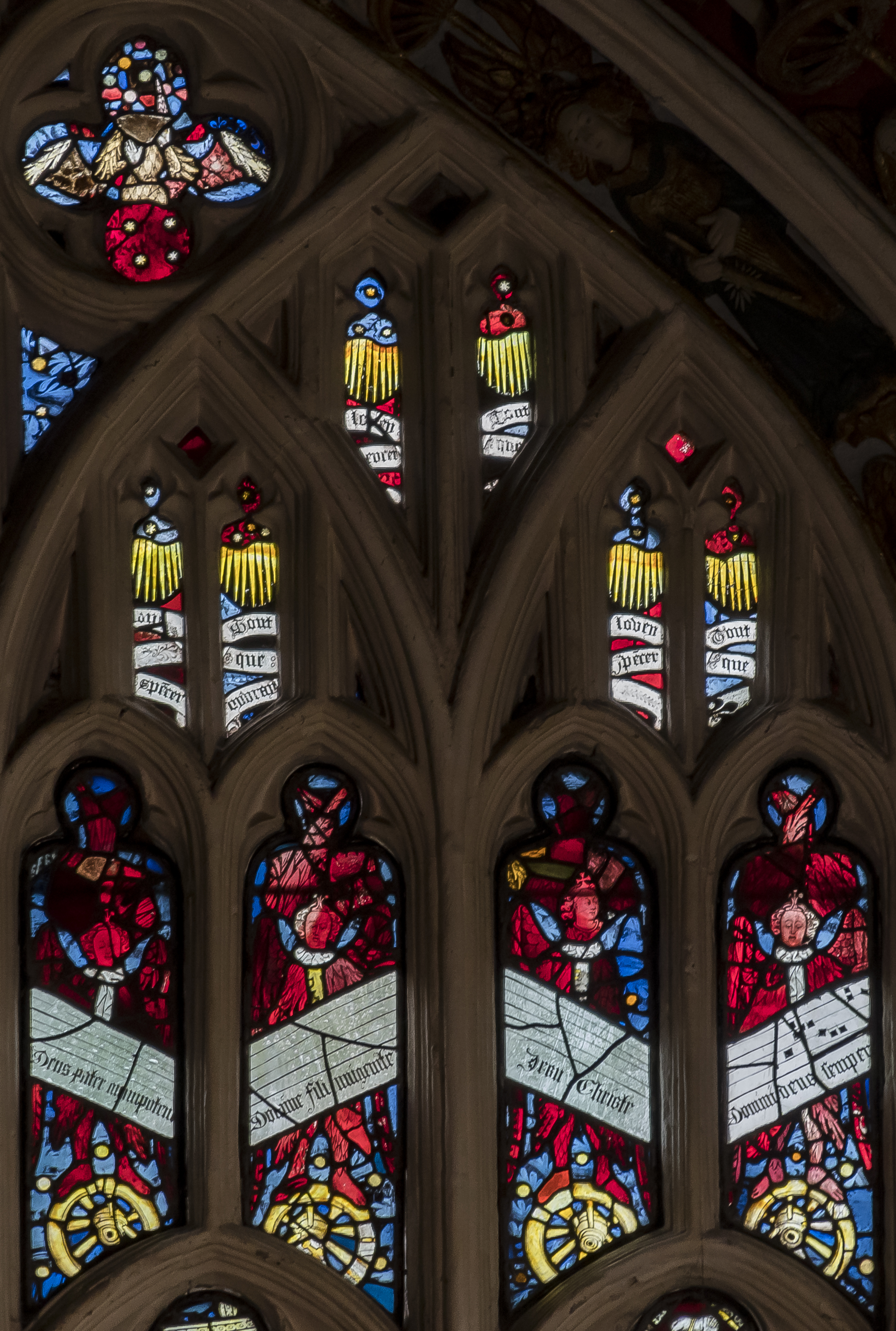

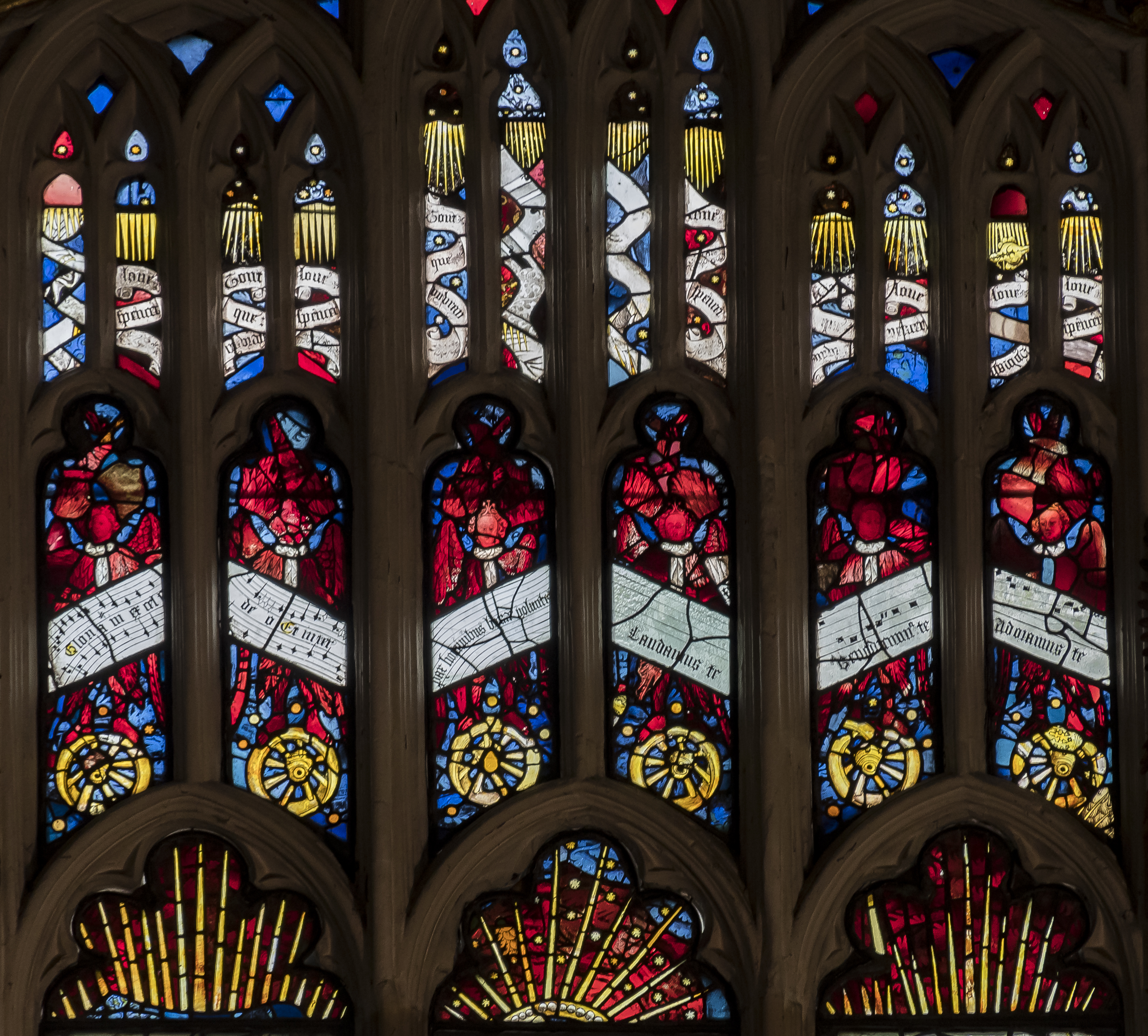
