= Idbury =

Village in Oxfordshire, England

Coordinates: 51.881°N 01.661°W

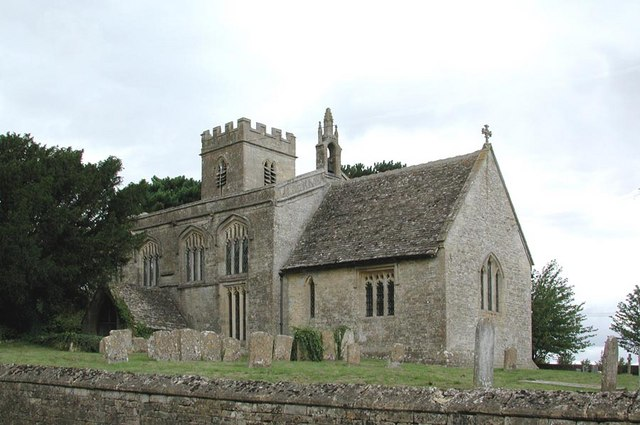
- St. Nicholas' parish church

- Location within Oxfordshire
- Population: 240 (parish, including Bould and Foscot) (2011 Census)
- OS grid reference: SP2319
- Civil parish: Idbury
- District: West Oxfordshire
- Shire county: Oxfordshire
- Region: South East
- Country: England
- Sovereign state: United Kingdom
- Post town: Chipping Norton
- Postcode district: OX7
- Dialling code: 01993
- Police: Thames Valley
- Fire: Oxfordshire
- Ambulance: South Central
- UK Parliament: Witney

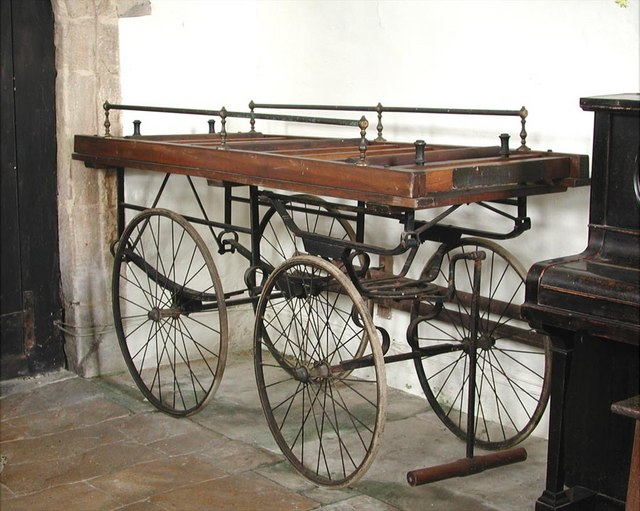
Historic hearse displayed inside St Nicholas' parish church

Idbury is a village and civil parish in the Cotswold Hills in Oxfordshire, about 4 1/2 miles (7 km) southeast of Stow-on-the-Wold in neighbouring Gloucestershire. The parish includes the hamlets of Bould and Foscot. The 2011 Census recorded the parish's population as 240.

== Archaeology ==
About 1/3 mile (540 m) west of the village is a hillfort, Idbury Camp. It was used in the Iron Age, Roman occupation and Saxon era, and possibly earlier. The village's toponym is derived from the Old English for "Ida's burh", further attesting to the fort's continued use in the Saxon era. The remains of its rampart are about 33 feet (10 m) wide, up to 16 inches (0.4 m) high and enclose an area of about 9 acres (3.6 ha). The fort is a scheduled monument.

== Parish church ==
The Church of England parish church of St Nicholas was originally Norman, but little survives from this period except the ornate north doorway. Early in the 14th century the bell-turret, north aisle, south porch and south doorway were added, new windows were inserted in the chancel and the chancel arch was altered. The east window is Decorated Gothic. The bell tower was added shortly afterwards. Later a clerestory was added to the nave and other windows were added to the nave and north aisle, all of them Perpendicular Gothic. The church is a Grade I listed building.

The tower has three bells, two of which are medieval. The second and tenor bells were cast in about 1420 by an unknown bellfounder, and the treble was cast in 1749 by Abel Rudhall of Gloucester. There is also a Sanctus bell that was cast in about 1320 and hangs in a bellcote on the gable end of the nave above the chancel arch. The tower also has an early turret clock of a type that is unusual for this part of England. It has a wooden frame more characteristic of the Midlands. Early in the 18th century, the clock was modified with the addition of a new escapement of unusual design, but the clock itself is considerably older. St Nicholas' parish is part of the Benefice of Shipton-under-Wychwood with Milton-under-Wychwood, Fifield and Idbury.

== Social history ==
Idbury had a Church of England school from 1845 until 1966. The building is now a private house. The engineer Sir Benjamin Baker, noted for his work on the Forth Bridge, London Victoria station and the first Aswan Dam, is buried in the churchyard.

== The Countryman ==
J. W. Robertson Scott moved to Idbury Manor in 1922 and founded The Countryman magazine there in 1927. In 1924 the novelist Sylvia Townsend Warner rented a cottage in Idbury from Robertson Scott. In 1934 the Canadian poet Frank Prewett moved to Idbury where he briefly worked as assistant editor of The Countryman. In 1949 Robertson Scott retired and the magazine moved to Burford, Oxfordshire. Apart from a short period in a London office, the magazine remained at Burford until 2003, when publication moved to Broughton Hall, North Yorkshire.

== Notable people ==
Idbury is the home of psychologist and psychotherapist Oliver James.

== Sources ==
- Beeson, C.F.C.; Northcote, L.S.; Simcock, A.V. (1989) [1962]. Clockmaking in Oxfordshire 1400–1850 (3rd ed.). Oxford: Museum of the History of Science. pp. 44, 166–170. ISBN 0-903364-06-9.
- Harden, D.B. (1954). "Scheduled Monuments in Oxfordshire" (PDF). Oxoniensia. XIX. Oxford Architectural and Historical Society: 137–145.
- Kerrigan, Michael (1998). Who Lies Where – A guide to famous graves. London: Fourth Estate. p. 123. ISBN 1-85702-258-0.
- Sherwood, Jennifer; Pevsner, Nikolaus (1974). Oxfordshire. The Buildings of England. Harmondsworth: Penguin Books. pp. 657–658. ISBN 0-14-071045-0.
- VCH (2014). "VCH Oxfordshire Texts in Progress: Idbury". Oxfordshire (PDF). Victoria County History. Vol. XIX.
