= Frank Ernest Howard =

English architect

Frank Ernest Howard (1888, Headington, Oxfordshire – 1934, Oxford) was an English architect who worked exclusively in the area of ecclesiastical furnishings and fittings.

He was a pupil of Sir Ninian Comper and carried out much of his work under the auspices of the Warham Guild. He published several books and articles on medieval ecclesiastical architecture and church furnishings which continue to be regarded as authoritative.

== Biographical summary ==
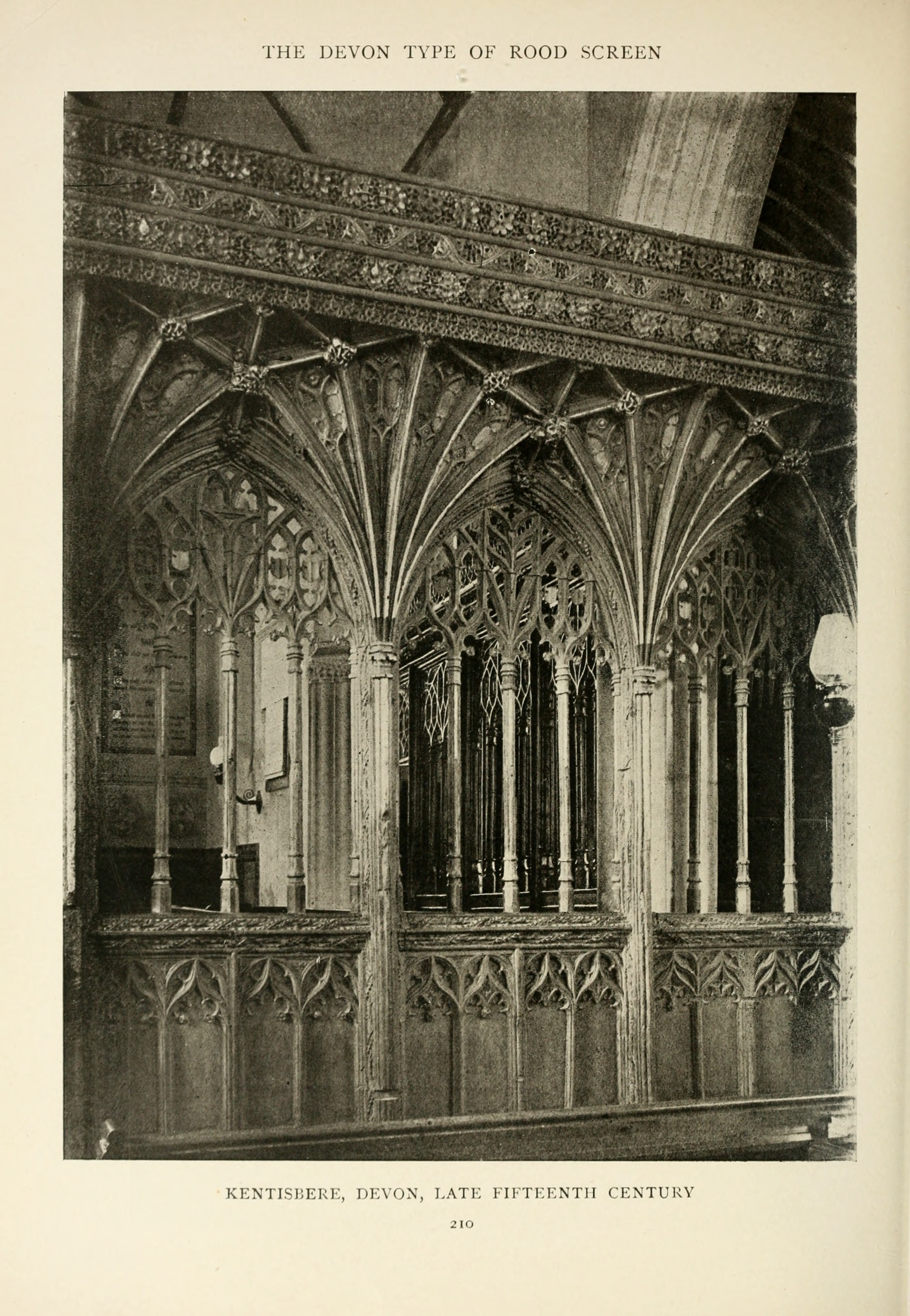
Kentisbeare rood screen. From English Church Woodwork (1917)

Frank Ernest Howard (1888–1934), commonly referred to as F.E. Howard, was a prolific designer of church furnishings based on his deep knowledge of ecclesiastical art and architecture in the Middle Ages. His work can be found throughout Great Britain but especially within the south of England close to his home base of Oxford where he lived for all his adult life. He also carried out commissions outside the British Isles as a result of his connection with the Warham Guild. His particular expertise and interest was in medieval church woodwork and he was the author, with F.H. Crossley, of an extensive and authoritative work on the subject, English church woodwork : a study in craftsmanship during the mediaeval period A.D. 1250–1550 (1917), a lavishly illustrated volume which was produced to a remarkably high standard, considering its date of publication during the depths of the Great War. Howard was responsible for all of the text and for the majority of the drawings. A second edition appeared in 1927 and was reissued in 1933. A facsimile reprint appeared in 2007, the work still being regarded as an authoritative source on the subject. His other major published work was Mediaeval styles of the English parish church, which was published posthumously in 1936. It is a wide-ranging and detailed guide to the ways in which church architecture evolved during the Middle Ages and is still frequently cited as an authority; a facsimile reprint of this work too appeared in 2007. He was an active member of the Royal Archaeological Institute of Great Britain and Ireland from 1909 until his death; he contributed several weighty articles to its transactions, the Archaeological Journal, and presented papers on similar subjects at meetings of the Institute which were not subsequently published.

Howard was a pupil of Sir Ninian Comper whose style and teachings had a strong influence on his own work. He was connected with the Warham Guild following its establishment in 1912 and under its auspices he designed many altars and altar screens (i.e. reredoses), all of which were examples of the English altar favoured by Comper. Further work was carried out for the church fitters, A.R. Mowbray, or was commissioned directly by the churches concerned. His work was always in a medieval style, within which he was capable of producing work that was both historically correct and aesthetically satisfying. As well as designing church furnishings and fittings he was also responsible for the restoration or extension of several churches, work which was always done sensitively and with a feel for the original structure, although by the time he was in a position to undertake such work the opportunities were rare.

Howard died in a nursing home in Oxford at the age of 46 on 15 April 1934. His funeral took place in St Margaret's church, Oxford and he is buried in Abingdon cemetery. Many of his design and working drawings of interior fittings are now held by the English Heritage Archive.

== Publications ==
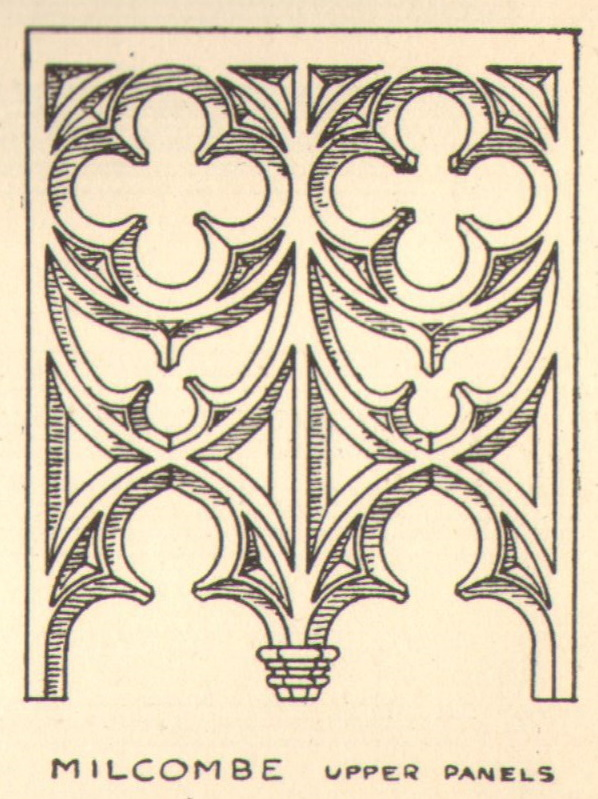
Detail of Chancel Screen, Milcombe. from Screens and rood-lofts of Oxfordshire (1910)

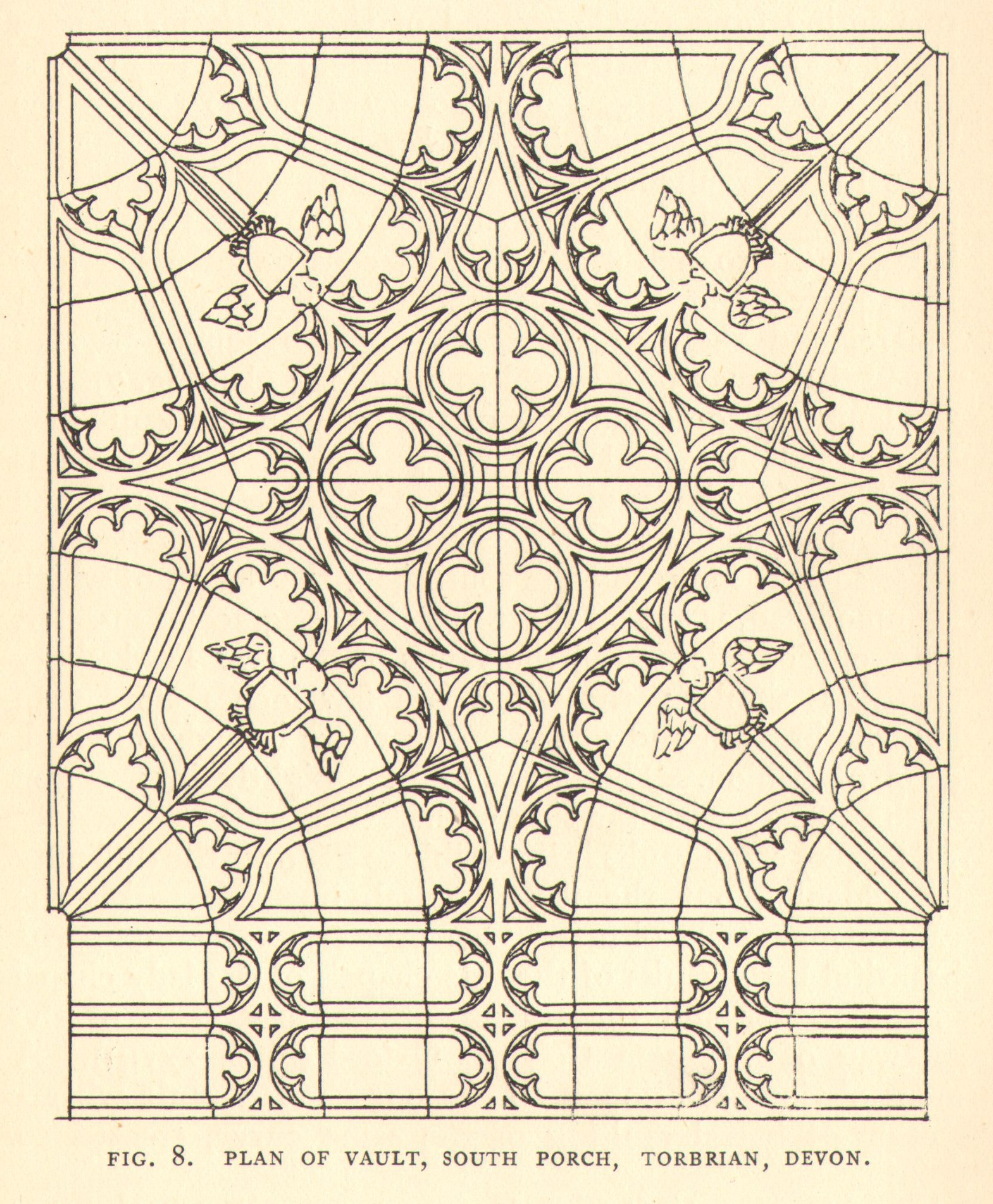
Vault of the south porch of Torbryan church. From Fan Vaults (1911)

- 'Les chantry-chapels anglaises' (with Paul Biver), Bulletin Monumental, 72 (1908), 314–47
- 'Chantry chapels in England' (with Paul Biver), Archaeological Journal, 66 (1909), 1–32
- 'Screens and rood-lofts in the parish churches of Oxfordshire', Archaeological Journal, 67 (1910), 151–201
- 'Fan Vaults', Archaeological Journal, 68 (1911), 1–42
- 'On the construction of mediaeval roofs', Archaeological Journal, 71 (1914), 293–352
- Old houses in Oxford; architectural notes and illustrations by F.E. Howard; and historical notes by H.E. Salter (Oxford : Oxford Architectural and Historical Society, 1914; 2nd ed 1920). pp 16
- English church woodwork : a study in craftsmanship during the mediaeval period A.D. 1250–1550 (with F.H. Crossley) (London : Batsford, 1917; 2nd ed 1927. Facsimile repr., Huddersfield : Jeremy Mills Publishing, 2007). pp xxxiii, 370
- The Chancel screen (London : Warham Guild, 1919) pp 20
- A Guide to Campden parish church, Glos. (London : S.P.C.K., 1929)
- The Parish church, West Hanney : a short description of its features (Wantage : Nichols, c1925)
- The Mediaeval styles of the English parish church : a survey of their development, design and features (London : Batsford, 1936. Facsimile repr., Huddersfield : Jeremy Mills Publishing, 2007). pp xi, 99

== Architectural work ==
No complete corpus of Howard's work is known to exist. The following list is derived from searches of published works in the fields of church history and architecture (e.g. The Buildings of England and related series) and of the internet. It is very likely that it can be enlarged to a considerable extent from descriptions of his work in local parish histories and similar works. It is also likely that work attributed generically to the Warham Guild, e.g. in Anson's Fashions in church furnishings 1840–1940, p. 312 are in fact by Howard.

=== England ===
==== Berkshire ====
- Clewer, St Andrew. Reredos in the Brocas chapel, c1920

==== Cambridgeshire ====
- Balsham. Font cover (very lofty and ornate), undated.
- Balsham. War Memorial, 1919.

==== Gloucestershire ====
Unless shown otherwise, details are from the appropriate entries in Pevsner or the Gloucester diocesan archives (Gloucestershire Archives. GDR/F1/1)

- Abenhall. Stone and slate memorial tablet, 1924
- Adelstrop. Marble war memorial tablet, 1920
- Bishop's Cleeve. Choir stalls, 1928. Oak doors, 1929
- Bledington. Restoration, 1928 (described by John Betjeman as "light and unspoiled") including the design of the sanctuary
- Bourton-on-Water. Oak screen and rood, 1924. Altar with carved and painted reredos, 1928. Painted chancel ceiling, 1929 (described by Goodhart-Rendel as one of the most beautiful coopered ceilings he had ever seen)
- Gloucester, St Michael. Oak credence table, processional cross, cross and candlesticks, 1927
- Lower Swell. Wooden screen and pulpit, 1925
- Minchinhampton. Alterations to chancel (with G. Webb), 1911
- Miserden. Chancel refurbishment, including altar and reredos, 1928
- Mitcheldean. Pulpit, 1922.
- Newent. Candlesticks, 1920
- Northleach. High altar with riddel posts, 1923
- South Cerney. Priest's seat, 1929
- Welford. Oak screen and brass tablet as war memorial, 1921
- Weston-on-Avon. Oak furniture, 1927
- Wyck Rissington. Oak reredos, 1918. Pulpit, 1925–6

==== Hertfordshire ====
- Lemsford. Chapel for Hall-Cain family, 1930
- Tring. High altar with reredos and riddel posts

==== Lancashire ====
- Bury, St Mary. Reredos and memorial to son of vicar, 1916
- Golborne, St Thomas. Vestry

==== London ====
- Streatham, St Peter. Pulpit, 1930

==== Nottinghamshire ====
- Nottingham, St Catharine. Polychromatic rood cross, 1925 (This church has been declared redundant and many of the fittings have been transferred to other churches.)

==== Oxfordshire ====
- Cuddesdon. Riddel posts, 1921
- Northmoor. War memorial, 1919
- Oxford, St Barnabas. Various fittings and vestments, c1929
- Oxford, St Hilda's College. College chapel, 1925
- Oxford, St Margaret. Reredos in north aisle, c1930
- Stanton Harcourt. War Memorial, 1921

==== Somerset ====
- High Ham. Font cover.

==== Suffolk ====
- Bungay, St Mary. Chancel, 1926
- Bury St Edmunds cathedral. Font cover (war memorial), c1920
- Lavenham. Illustrated report on the condition of the roofs and other woodwork, 1925
- Southwold, St Edmund. Restoration, including painting of pulpit and provision of font cover, c1930
- Stowlangtoft. War memorial, c1920

==== Sussex ====
- Bognor Regis, St Wilfrid. Reredos, 1919 (originally in St John's church, Bognor Regis, now demolished)
- Egdean. Alterations, 1928
- Henfield. Reredos in Parham chapel

==== Warwickshire ====
- Atherstone. High altar with reredos and riddel posts

==== Wiltshire ====
- Chippenham, St Andrew. Rood screen, 1921

=== Wales ===
- Disserth, Radnorshire. Restoration, undated
- Llansannor, Glamorgan. Reredos, 1926
- Swansea, Home of the Good Shepherd, Eastmoor (former children's home). Unspecified architectural work, 1925
- Swansea, St Gabriel. Altar with carved and painted reredos, screen enclosing Lady chapel, 1920. Choir stalls, 1928. Font, 1931

=== Scotland ===
- North Berwick, East Lothian, St Baldred's Episcopal church. Conversion of south apse to Lady chapel, 1921

=== Canada ===
- Halifax cathedral, Nova Scotia. Altar and reredos in St Stephen's chapel, c1929 and perhaps other work in this cathedral

=== South Africa ===
- Cape Town cathedral. Hanging rood above the high altar

== Other sources ==
- Directory of British architects, 1834–1914. Updated and expanded ed. / by Antonia Brodie [et al.] (London: Continuum, 2001) v 2, p 81. ISBN 0-8264-4963-8
