= Warham Guild =

Anglican organization of craftsmen

The Warham Guild was an Anglican organization of craftsmen and artisans, founded to "augment the studies of the Alcuin Club and the directives of The Parson's Handbook" with "the making of all the 'Ornaments of the Church and of the Ministers thereof' according to the standard of the Ornaments Rubric, and under fair conditions of labour." It was named for William Warham, who served as Archbishop of Canterbury in the period leading up to the break with papal authority.

The guild was founded in London in 1912. It was headed by Percy Dearmer until his death in 1936. After that point the guild became closely associated with AR Mowbray, a business producing church vestments. This business was acquired by ecclesiastic retailer J. Wippell & Co. in 1969, which today owns the guild's vestment patterns.

The guild published a number of works detailing the design of church building and their ornaments, and outlining how the guild approached producing new ornaments and vestments. The guild published their Handbook for the first time in 1932, described as "a condensed and up-to-date version" of The Glossary of Ecclesiastical Ornament by Augustus Pugin. Architectural historian James Bettley noted that it promoted the "Primrose" aesthetic of white church walls and coloured vestments, in contrast to the plainer vestments and brighter walls advocated by Richard Frederick Littledale decades previous.

Extant works by the guild include the altar of St Mary's Church, Badley in Suffolk and several components of the Parish Church of St James the Great, High Wych in Hertfordshire, a Grade II* listed building.

== See also ==
- Sarum rite
