= Dudsday =

Annual festival in Kilmarnock, Scotland

Dudsday, also Duds' day, or Dud's day was a hiring fair, a holiday, held at Kilmarnock in East Ayrshire, Scotland. Originally held at Martinmas that falls on November 11 it was later also held at Whitsun. At this fair farm labourers would be hired.

== History ==
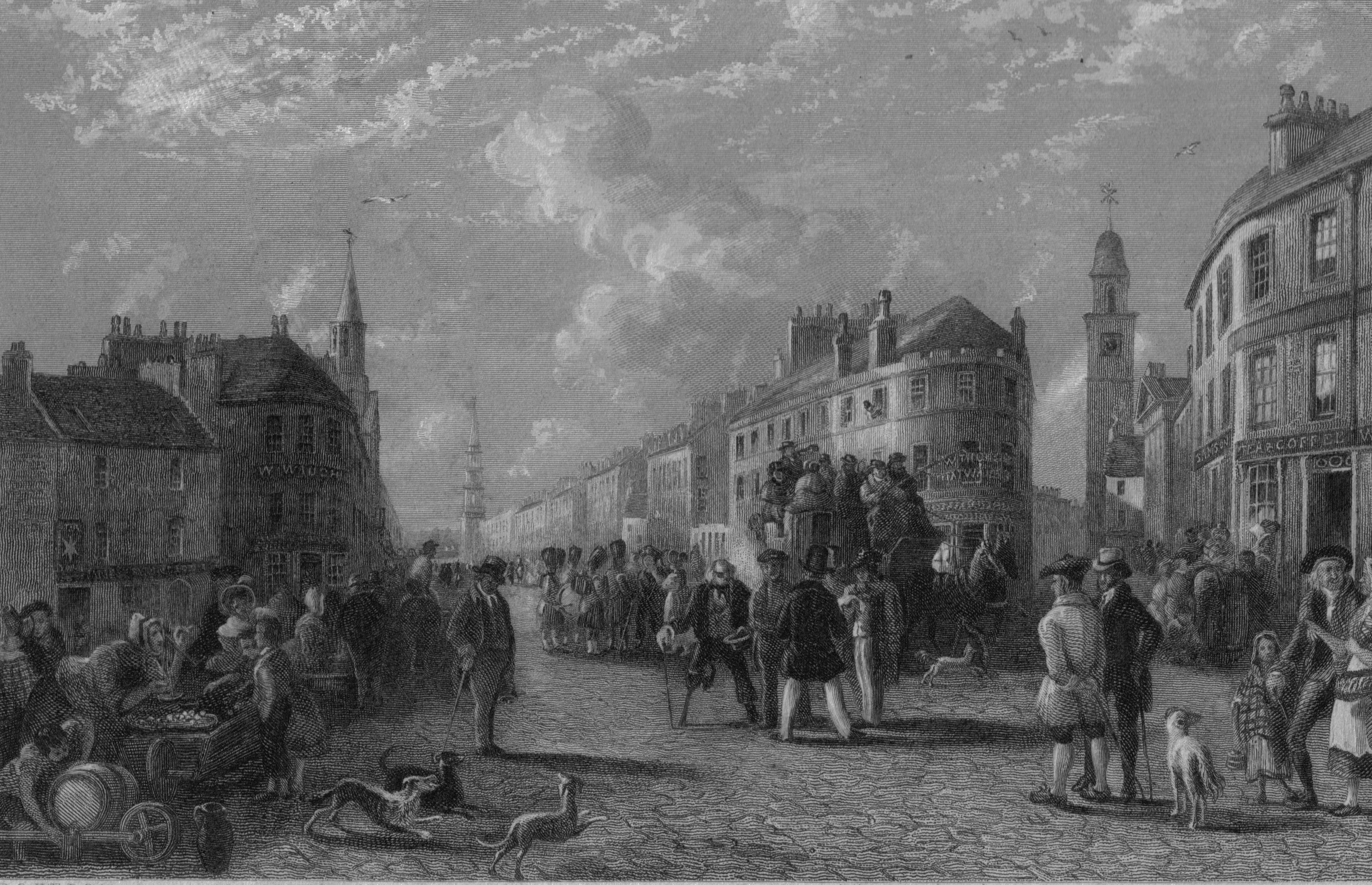
Kilmarnock Cross in 1840.

The fair's name comes from the custom of farm Labourers purchasing new clothes or duds (from the Middle English word dudde, a cloak) having been paid their wages for the previous half-year.

Later the name was applied to the spring hiring fair at Whitsun in Kilmarnock also and to other similar fairs held in other parts of Ayrshire for the same purpose. The Kilmarnock Dudsday ceased to be held after 1939, the name previously becoming also attached to hiring markets set at other dates than the traditional Dudsday.

These fairs were eagerly looked forward to by merchants and were especially busy for the shopkeepers and the taverns. Farm labourers hoped to either renew or gain better employment at these Dudsday fairs. The 'Ayr Advertiser' for 21 October 1920 records of a hiring event that "There were not a great many single men engaged, a large proportion of them preferring to wait till Dudd's Day."

Archibald McKay in his 1880 'History of Kilmarnock' makes mention of several fairs such as 'Fastern's E'en' (Shrove Tuesday) but gives no reference to Dudsday or any tradition of hiring fairs.

=== Hirings ===
One general report for hiring fairs states that

Prospective workers would gather in the street or market place, often sporting some sort of badge or tool to denote their speciality: shepherds held a crook or a tuft of wool, cowmen brought wisps of straw, dairymaids carried a milking stool or pail and housemaids held brooms or mops, this is why some hiring fairs were known as mop fairs. Employers would look them over and, if they were thought fit, hire them for the coming year, handing over a shilling to seal the arrangement. Both male and female agricultural servants would gather in order to bargain with prospective employers and, hopefully, secure a position for the coming year. The yearly hiring included board and lodging for single employees for the whole year with wages being paid at the end of the year's service.

=== The Murder of James Young ===
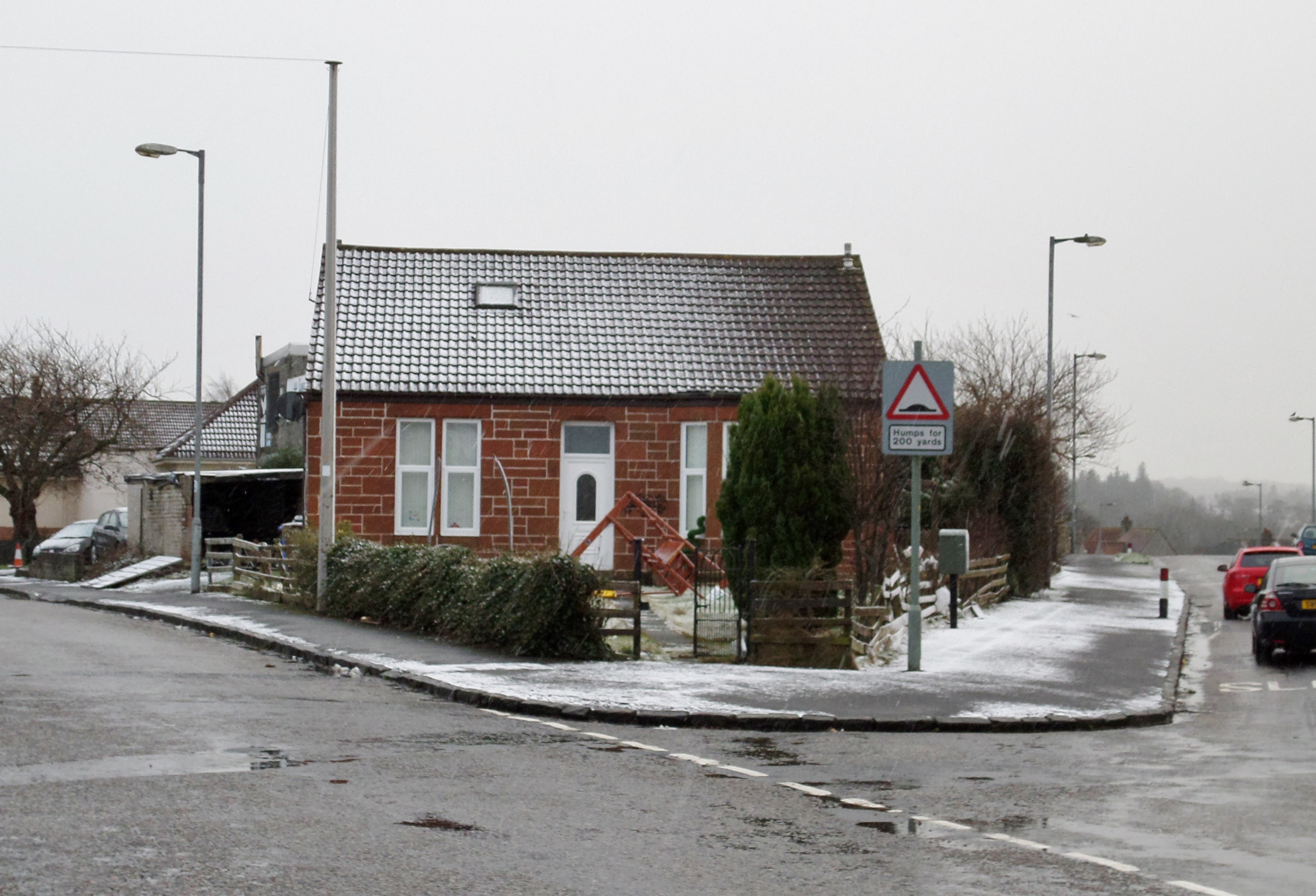
Knowehead Cottage, James Young's home in Riccarton near Kilmarnock.

The fact that Dudsday meant that farm labourers were guaranteed to be visiting Kilmarnock in large numbers with money in their pockets attracted pick-pockets and worse. In 1848 a young farm servant from Fortacres Farm near Gatehead was murdered by James McWheelan whilst returning from the Kilmarnock 'Dudd's-day' (sic). James had fifteen shillings in silver and a silver watch, both of which were stolen and the victim being knocked unconscious with a boulder and then stabbed in the neck with a carpenter's chisel. The murderer was caught near Paisley and hung after a trial at Ayr.

Such was the notoriety of the murder and sympathy for the victim that passers by took to leaving a stone at the spot to create a cairn (NS 39979 34140) that grew to a fairly considerable size. The cairn is no longer apparent as the site has attracted random dumping of various materials over the years.

Adamson's comment in his 'Rambles Round Kilmarnock' was that the ".. marks the spot where one of the most cold-blooded and heartless murders that ever stained the annals of our country."

== See also ==
- Riccarton, Ayrshire
- Kilmarnock
