= Foscot, Oxfordshire =

Hamlet in Oxfordshire, England

Coordinates: 51.896°N 01.639°W

Foscot
- Location within Oxfordshire
- OS grid reference: SP2421
- Civil parish: Idbury
- District: West Oxfordshire
- Shire county: Oxfordshire
- Region: South East
- Country: England
- Sovereign state: United Kingdom
- Post town: Chipping Norton
- Postcode district: OX7
- Police: Thames Valley
- Fire: Oxfordshire
- Ambulance: South Central
- UK Parliament: Witney

Foscot is a hamlet in the Cotswolds in the Evenlode valley. It falls within Idbury civil parish, in the West Oxfordshire District, about 5 miles (8.0 km) southeast of Stow-on-the-Wold in neighbouring Gloucestershire, and 1.7 miles (2.7 km) from Kingham. It is in a designated Area of Outstanding Natural Beauty. Foscot is in the ecclesiastical parish of St Leonard, Bledington and is socially integrated with the adjacent Bledington village. The major landowner is Loudham Estates, based at Foxcote Farm. Foxholes, a woodland nature reserve sloping down to the River Evenlode with year-round colour and wildlife interest, is adjacent to Foscot. It is noted for its spring bluebells and abundant bat and bird life and is managed by the Berkshire, Buckinghamshire and Oxfordshire Wildlife Trust.
