= Jope =

Jope is a given name, nickname and surname. It may refer to:

- Alan Jope, CEO-designate of Unilever
- Bernhard Jope (1914–1995), German World War II Luftwaffe bomber pilot
- Margaret Jope (1913–2004), Scottish biochemist, wife of Martyn Jope
- Martyn Jope (1915–1996), English archaeologist and chemist
- Jope Namawa (born 1974), Fijian footballer
- Jope Seniloli (1939–2015), Fijian chief and former Vice-President of Fiji
- Jorma Jope Ruonansuu (1964–2020), Finnish actor, impressionist, musician and stand-up comedian

== See also ==
- Joop (disambiguation)
