= Ascott d'Oyley =

Village in Oxfordshire, England

Coordinates: 51.86°N 01.56°W

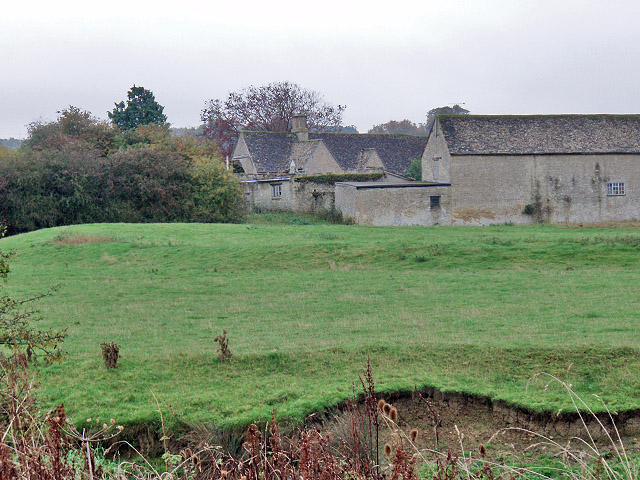
- The listed manor house behind the earthworks that remain of the castle

- Location within Oxfordshire
- OS grid reference: SP3018
- Civil parish: Ascott-under-Wychwood
- District: West Oxfordshire
- Shire county: Oxfordshire
- Region: South East
- Country: England
- Sovereign state: United Kingdom
- Police: Thames Valley
- Fire: Oxfordshire
- Ambulance: South Central
- UK Parliament: Witney

Ascott d'Oyley is a village in Oxfordshire, England. The name 'Ascott' is derived from the Old English ēast (east) and cot (cottage), whilst d’Oyley was appended because Wido de Oileo 'held the place in the late eleventh century.' Ascott d’Oyley with its sister village Ascott Earl together form the larger community of Ascott-under-Wychwood.

Ascott d’Oyley is recorded in the 1086 Domesday Book as having 14 households and a mill, under the lordship of Roger d'Oilly, and tenanted by Robert d’Oilly, whose family gives the village its name. This likely represented a population of around 100. An earth-mound marks the remains of Ascott d’Oyley Castle which is protected as a scheduled monument.

Today the village consists of stone-built houses and cottages grouped around the High Street and Mill Lane. Ascott d'Oyley is served by Windrush Valley School and Ascott-under-Wychwood railway station.

== See also ==
- Ascot d'Oilly Castle
