= Ascott Martyrs =

Women imprisoned for union activities in England in 1873

The Ascott Martyrs were 16 women from the village of Ascott-under-Wychwood in Oxfordshire, England who were imprisoned in 1873 for their role in founding a branch of the National Union of Agricultural Workers.

== Background ==
The National Union of Agricultural Workers was founded in Warwickshire in 1872, led by the Primitive Methodist preacher Joseph Arch. Support spread to other parts of the country, and in 1873 the men of Ascott-under-Wychwood formed a branch of the new union.

== The incident ==
Mr Hambidge of Crown Farm, Ascott sacked his men who had joined the union and employed men from the neighbouring village of Ramsden as strike breakers. The women of Ascott tried to persuade the Ramsden men to join the Union and deter them from working for Mr Hambidge. The women were arrested and taken to Chipping Norton where on 20 May 1873 they were charged with "obstructing and coercing John Hodgkins and John Miller with a view to inciting them to leave their employment". Revd T. Harris and Revd W. E. Carter, the two magistrates, heard the case. They asked Mr Hambidge, the farmer not to proceed with prosecution, but he insisted on pressing charges. The women considered to be ringleaders, not defended by counsel, were sentenced to imprisonment with hard labour, seven of them for 10 days, and nine of the women for 7 days. A newspaper in 1873 printed the story under the heading, "Rioting in Chipping Norton".

The seven women imprisoned for 10 days with hard labour were: Martha Maria Smith aged 45, Rebecca Smith aged 25, Mary Moss (alias Smith) aged 17, Charlotte Moss aged 39, Ann Susan Moss aged 25, Ann Moss aged 22 and Fanny Honeybone aged just 16.

The nine women sentenced to 7 days' imprisonment with hard labour were: Elizabeth Pratley, aged 29, Mary Pratley aged 33, Ellen Pratley aged 25, Lavinia Dring, aged 44, Amelia Moss aged 36, Martha Moss, aged 33, Caroline Moss, aged 18, Jane Moss aged 31 and Mary Moss aged 35.

By 9pm on 20 May 1873, a crowd of 1,000 people had surrounded the Police Court. They tried fruitlessly to free the women, breaking street lamps and windows. The violence continued for two hours.

The women were kept in two dark jails until 1am. When police were satisfied the crowds had scattered and reinforcements had arrived from Oxford the 16 women were taken on four horse-drawn drays to Oxford Prison. Two of the women had young children with them, Elizabeth Pratley had a child of 7 months and Mary Pratley had a child of 10 weeks. Being transported on a cold night with no warm clothing, the women did their best to protect the babies with umbrellas. The rest of the women's children were cared for by neighbours and the Milton-under-Wychwood branch of the Union, while the women were imprisoned.

== Aftermath ==
The local community remained furious at the treatment of the women, leading to questions being asked in Parliament and nationwide newspaper coverage of the events. A popular story later developed that Queen Victoria pardoned the women, and presented them each with a red-flannel petticoat and 5 shillings, but there is no evidence for this. The Home Secretary, however, agreed a 'conditional pardon' to remit the hard labour element of the sentence, sending a telegram to the Oxford prison governor. "I have advised Her Majesty to remit that part of the sentence of the women still in custody under committal by the Chadlington bench of magistrates which imposed hard labour in addition to imprisonment they are not therefore to be kept any longer at hard labour, an official authority will follow in due course." It was, however, received too late to be effective. On release, the women returned to their village as martyrs for the cause. The National Union of Agricultural Workers gave each of them £5 and enough blue silk to make a dress.

Following the Ascott Martyrs' time in prison, the Chairman of the Oxford District of the Union investigated the wages and conditions of Ascott farm workers and found that before the Union, wages had been 9 shillings a week in winter and 10 shillings in summer. Following the founding of the Union branch wages were raised by 2 shillings a week, so the women's efforts had clearly been successful.

Appointment of clerical magistrates: in spite of public indignation and widespread protest at the sentencing by the two magistrates, the position of clergymen as magistrates did not change as a result of this case. Revd Harris and Revd Carter continued as Oxfordshire magistrates for a further 23 and 30 years respectively, and local clergymen continued to be appointed as magistrates- as, indeed, they can be now.

== Commemoration ==
On the Ascott Martyrs' centenary in 1973 an octagonal wooden seat was installed encircling the trunk of a chestnut tree on Ascott-under-Wychwood village green with a memorial plaque stating:

This seat was erected to celebrate the centenary of the Ascott Martyrs, the 16 women who were sent to prison in 1873 for the part they played in the founding of the Agricultural Workers Union when they were sent "over the hills to glory".

The 1973 memorial has been replaced with four benches surrounding the tree listing the names of the martyrs and those who supported them.

The episode is explored more fully in the collection of essays The Ascott Martyrs: Why did the rural establishment imprison sixteen women and two babies in 1873?, published in 2023. seeThe Ascott Martyrs - From Tolpuddle to the Cotswolds - Oxfordshire

== Sources ==
- http://www.historic-uk.com/HistoryUK/England-History/AscotMartyrs.htm
- http://www.ascott-under-wychwood.org.uk/2002/02/01/ascott-under-wychwood-2002-kingsley/
- http://www.ascott-under-wychwood.org.uk/about/
- http://www.britainexpress.com/counties/oxfordshire/Ascott-under-Wychwood.htm
- https://web.archive.org/web/20091022211049/http://geocities.com/Heartland/Plains/6081/
