= Wychwood Way =

Long-distance footpath in Oxfordshire, England

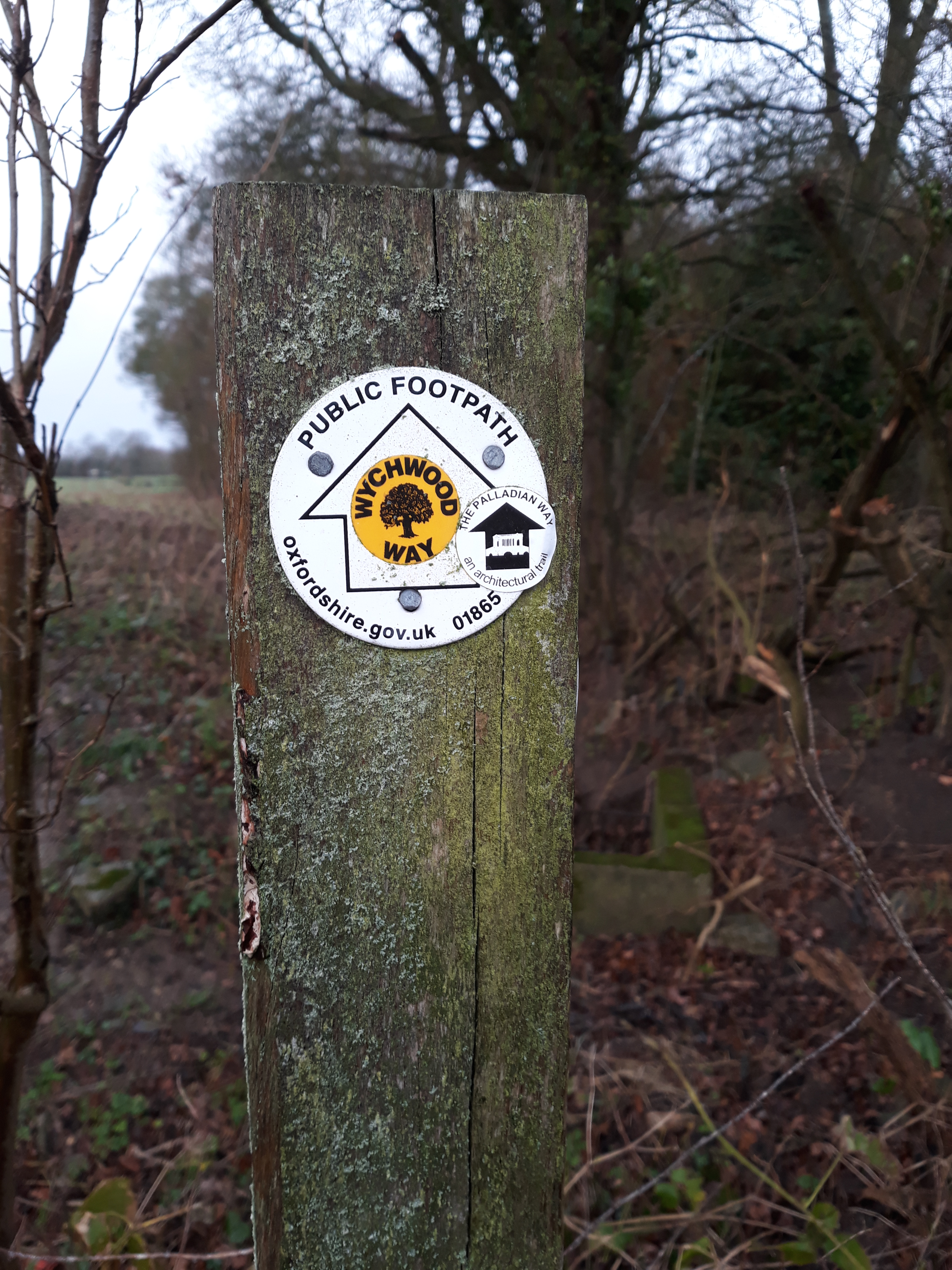
Wychwood Way footpath marker

The Wychwood Way is a waymarked long-distance footpath in southern England in the United Kingdom.

== Length of the Route ==
The route runs for 59.5 km (37 mi).

== The route ==
The Wychwood Way runs through the ancient Royal Forest of Wychwood in West Oxfordshire.

It is a circular walk and starts from Woodstock, Oxfordshire passing through Stonesfield, Chadlington, Ascott-under-Wychwood, Leafield, Ramsden, North Leigh, East End, Oxfordshire, incorporates part of the Roman road of Akeman Street and the older route of the Saltway crossing Blenheim Park and links in with the Oxfordshire Way.
