= Lyneham, Oxfordshire =

Village in Oxfordshire, England

Coordinates: 51.884°N 1.595°W

Lyneham
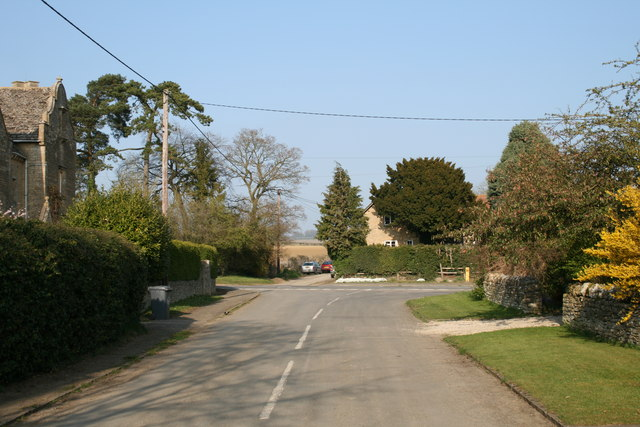

- Location within Oxfordshire
- Population: 153 (2011 Census)
- OS grid reference: SP2309
- Civil parish: Lyneham
- District: West Oxfordshire
- Shire county: Oxfordshire
- Region: South East
- Country: England
- Sovereign state: United Kingdom
- Post town: Chipping Norton
- Postcode district: OX7
- Dialling code: 01993
- Police: Thames Valley
- Fire: Oxfordshire
- Ambulance: South Central
- UK Parliament: Witney

Lyneham is a village and civil parish about 5 miles (8 km) southwest of Chipping Norton, Oxfordshire. It is bounded to the southwest by the River Evenlode, to the southeast by the A361 road linking Chipping Norton and Burford, and on other sides by field boundaries. The 2011 Census recorded the parish's population as 153.

== History ==
Lyneham Camp or the Roundabout is a former Iron Age hill fort about 1 1/2 miles (2.4 km) northeast of the village beside the A361 road. It was excavated in 1956. About 250 yards southwest of the hill fort is Lyneham Longbarrow, which was excavated in 1894. The barrow is of Cotswold-Severn type and contains two chambers. North-west of the barrow is a standing stone that it is believed was originally part of the barrow.

Lyneham was a chapelry of the Church of England parish of St Mary, Shipton-under-Wychwood until 1895. It was then transferred to the parish of St Simon and Jude, Milton-under-Wychwood. The church of St Michael and All Angels was built in Lyneham in 1907. It was a timber-framed building with a corrugated iron exterior, colloquially called a "tin tabernacle". It ceased to be used for worship early in the 1970s and was demolished in 1975.

In the 19th century the Oxford, Worcester and Wolverhampton Railway was built through the south of the parish along the Evenlode valley. The line was authorised in 1845 and completed in 1853. This part of the OW&W Railway is now the Cotswold Line. Its nearest station is Shipton, about 1 1/2 miles (2.4 km) south of Lyneham by road.

== Sources and further reading ==
- Benson, Don; Whittle, Alasdair, eds. (2007). Building Memories: The neolithic Cotswold long barrow at Ascott-under-Wychwood, Oxfordshire. Oxford: Oxbow Books. ISBN 9781842172360.
- Greenaway, Diana, ed. (1991). Fasti Ecclesiae Anglicanae 1066–1300. Vol. 4, Salisbury. London: Institute of Historical Research. pp. 97–98.
- Lobel, Mary D, ed. (1962). A History of the County of Oxford. Victoria County History. Vol. 7: Thame and Dorchester Hundreds. London: Oxford University Press for the Institute of Historical Research. pp. 117–146.
- Page, W.H., ed. (1907). A History of the County of Oxford. Victoria County History. Vol. 2: Ecclesiastical History, etc. Westminster: Archibald Constable & Co. pp. 1–63, 303–349.
- Salzman, L.F. (ed.); Page, William; Salter, Herbert E.; Lobel, Mary D; Crossley, Alan (1939). A History of the County of Oxford. Victoria County History. Vol. 1: Natural history, etc. London: Oxford University Press for the University of London Institute of Historical Research. pp. 238–241, 251–266, 346–372, 373–395.
