= Cornbury and Wychwood =

Civil parish in West Oxfordshire, England

Coordinates: 51.859°N 1.458°W

- Civil parish
- Location within Oxfordshire
- Civil parish: Cornbury and Wychwood
- District: West Oxfordshire
- Shire county: Oxfordshire
- Region: South East
- Country: England
- Sovereign state: United Kingdom
- Post town: Chipping Norton
- Postcode district: OX7
- Dialling code: 01608
- Police: Thames Valley
- Fire: Oxfordshire
- Ambulance: South Central
- UK Parliament: Banbury

Cornbury and Wychwood is a civil parish in West Oxfordshire. It includes the country estate of Cornbury Park (Ordnance Survey grid reference SP350181) and the ancient former Royal Forest of Wychwood, which covers several square miles between Cornbury Park, the village of Leafield (grid reference SP3215) and the hamlet of Mount Skippett (SP352159).
