= Leafield =

Village in Oxfordshire, England

Coordinates: 51.836°N 1.540°W

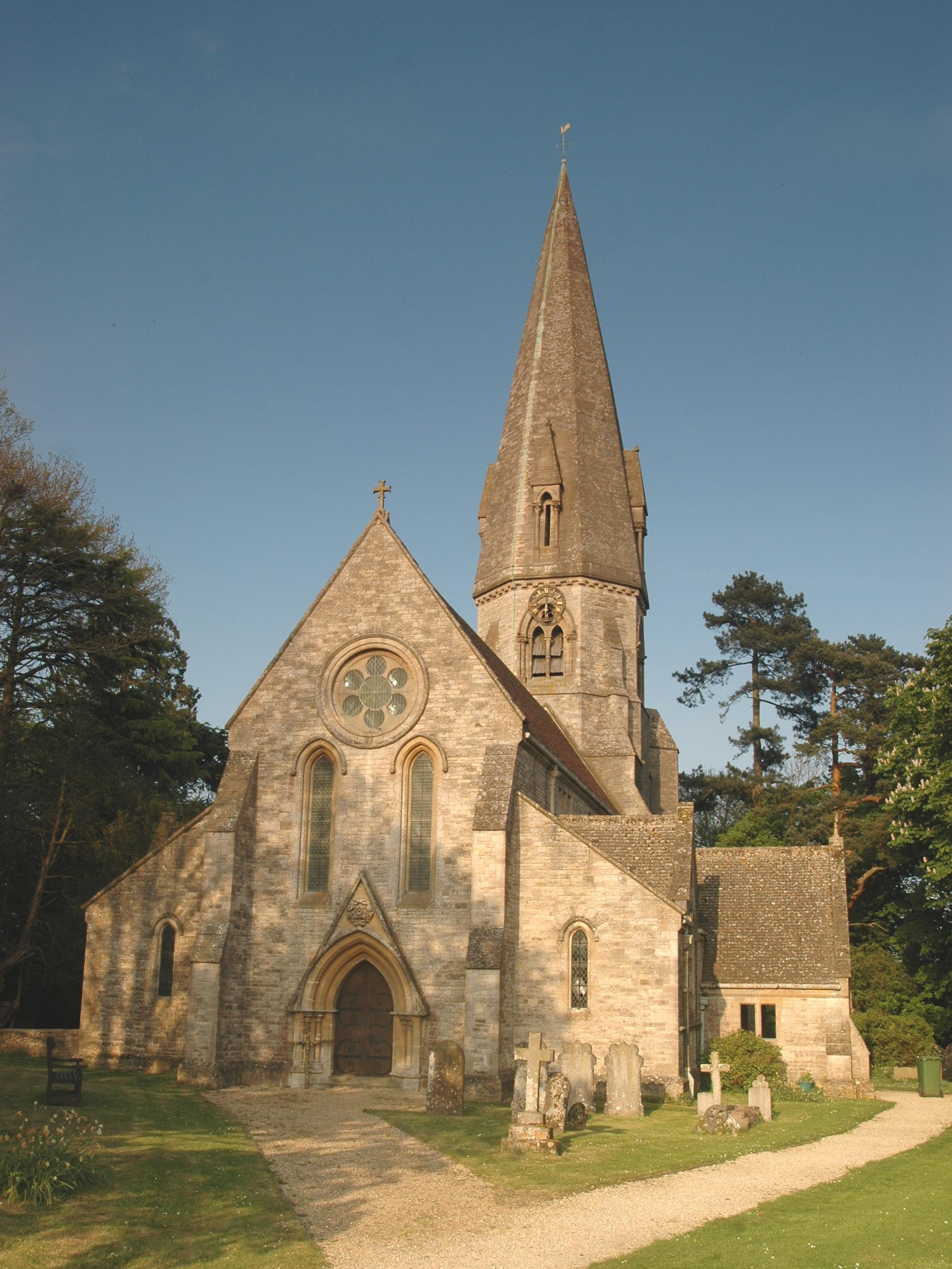
- St Michael's parish church

- Location within Oxfordshire
- Population: 945 (2011 Census)
- OS grid reference: SP318153
- Civil parish: Leafield
- District: West Oxfordshire
- Shire county: Oxfordshire
- Region: South East
- Country: England
- Sovereign state: United Kingdom
- Post town: Witney
- Postcode district: OX29
- Dialling code: 01993
- Police: Thames Valley
- Fire: Oxfordshire
- Ambulance: South Central
- UK Parliament: Witney
- Website: Parish Council

Leafield is a village and civil parish about 4 miles (6.4 km) northwest of Witney in West Oxfordshire, England. The parish includes the hamlet of Langley, 1 mile (1.6 km) west of Leafield village. The 2011 Census recorded the parish's population as 945. The village is 635 feet (194 m) above sea level in the Cotswold Hills. It was the highest point in Oxfordshire until the 1974 county boundary changes enlarged the county.

== Archaeology ==
There are a number of tumuli in the parish, including Leafield Barrow, locally called Barry's Hill Tump, on top of the hill just to the north of the village. Leafield Barrow also has archaeological evidence for being the site of a medieval motte-and-bailey castle called Leafield Castle. The castle would be situated at a position in the village which would have given it a commanding view of the settlement. There are visible earthworks present which would add to the castle's defensive capability. The castle is believed to form a similar shape to that of Ascot d'Oilly Castle.

== History ==
The parish is within the former limits of the Wychwood forest. The area of forest south of Langley was cleared in 1857–58, leaving straight, regular field boundaries typical of the 18th and 19th century enclosures. The village has the remains of a medieval preaching cross. The steps and lower part of its base are old. A new Gothic Revival shaft and top were added in 1873 in thanksgiving for the village escaping a smallpox epidemic. King James I stayed at Langley in August 1605.

Leafield was a dependent chapelry of the ecclesiastical parish of Shipton-under-Wychwood until the 19th century. Leafield's Church of England parish church of Saint Michael and All Angels was designed by Sir George Gilbert Scott, built in 1859 and consecrated in 1860. The bell tower was completed in 1874 and has a ring of six bells, all cast that year by John Taylor & Co of Loughborough. St. Michael's is now a member of the Forest Edge Benefice.

Leafield Church of England Primary School opened in 1839. It was expanded by the building of additional classrooms in 1871, 1897 and 1904. The 1871 classroom was designed by the architect C.C. Rolfe. Leafield's school district was expanded in 1873 to include Asthall, Langley and Wychwood. Leafield C of E School resisted Oxfordshire County Council's attempts to reorganise it as a junior school until after the Second World War. The school's catchment area was expanded in 1986 to include Ascott-under-Wychwood.

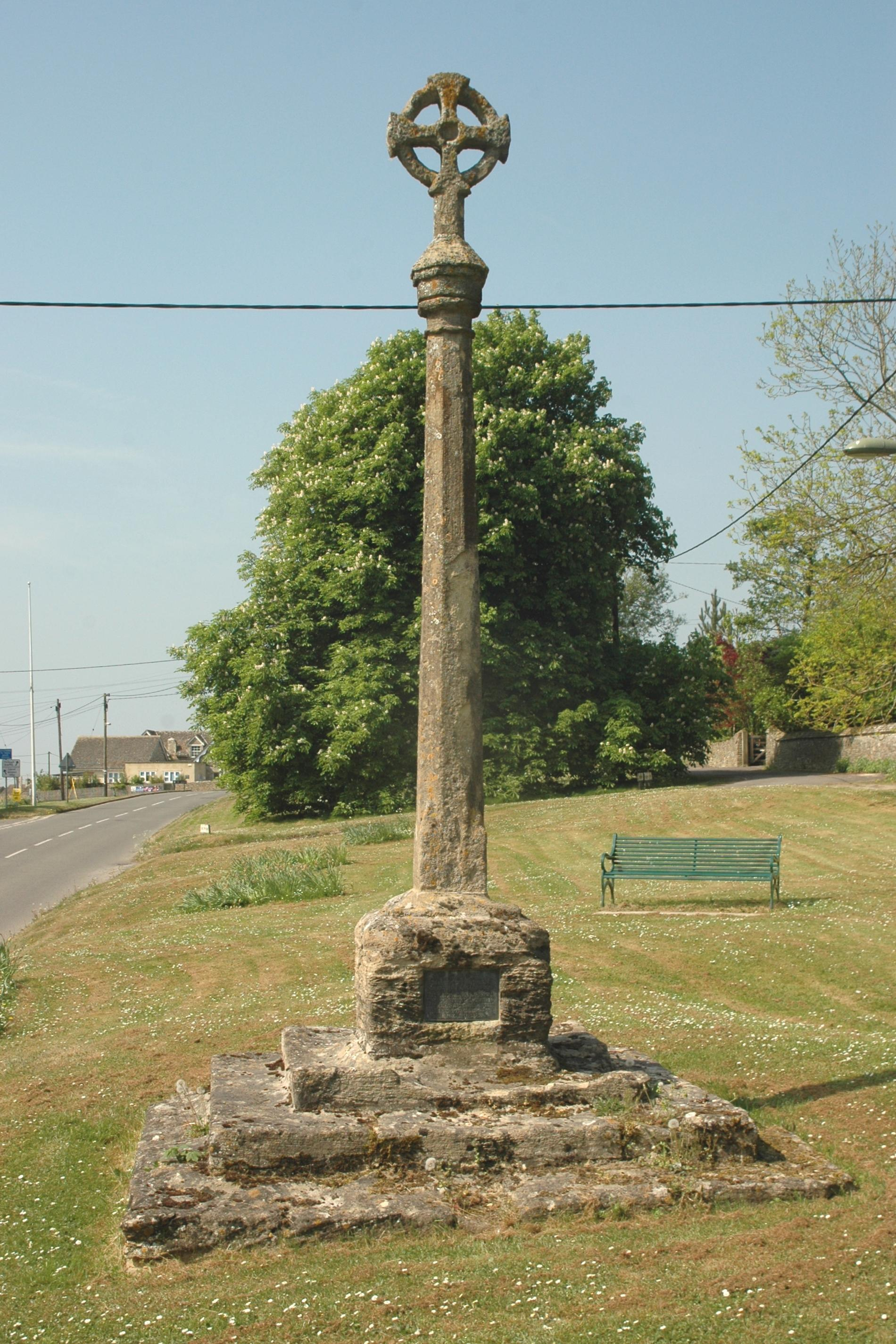
Gothic Revival preaching cross on medieval steps and base

== Leafield Technical Centre ==
A large radio transmission station was sited at Langley from 1912 until 1986. British Telecom redeveloped the site as a training college, but then closed the site in 1993. It was then used by Tom Walkinshaw Racing (TWR) as a motorsport development centre for the Arrows Formula One team, until the team's demise in the 2002 season. From the 2006 season until the 2008 season Leafield Technical Centre was the headquarters of the now-defunct Super Aguri F1 team. Menard Competition Technologies was based at Leafield Technical Centre in 2011. MCT has made the engines for Norton Motorcycles' range of Commando 961 models since 2009. In January 2012 Caterham F1 announced that they would be moving to Leafield from their original base at Hingham, Norfolk. Caterham F1 subsequently went bankrupt and the Technical Centre is now experiencing redevelopment into holiday homes.

== Amenities ==
Leafield has one public house:s The Fox. The Fox was closed for 15 months after Greene King Brewery shut it in January 2010. An independent lessee reopened it in April 2011 and it is now a free house..The Wychwood Way, a 37 miles (60 km) circular walking trail, passes through Leafield Lower End.

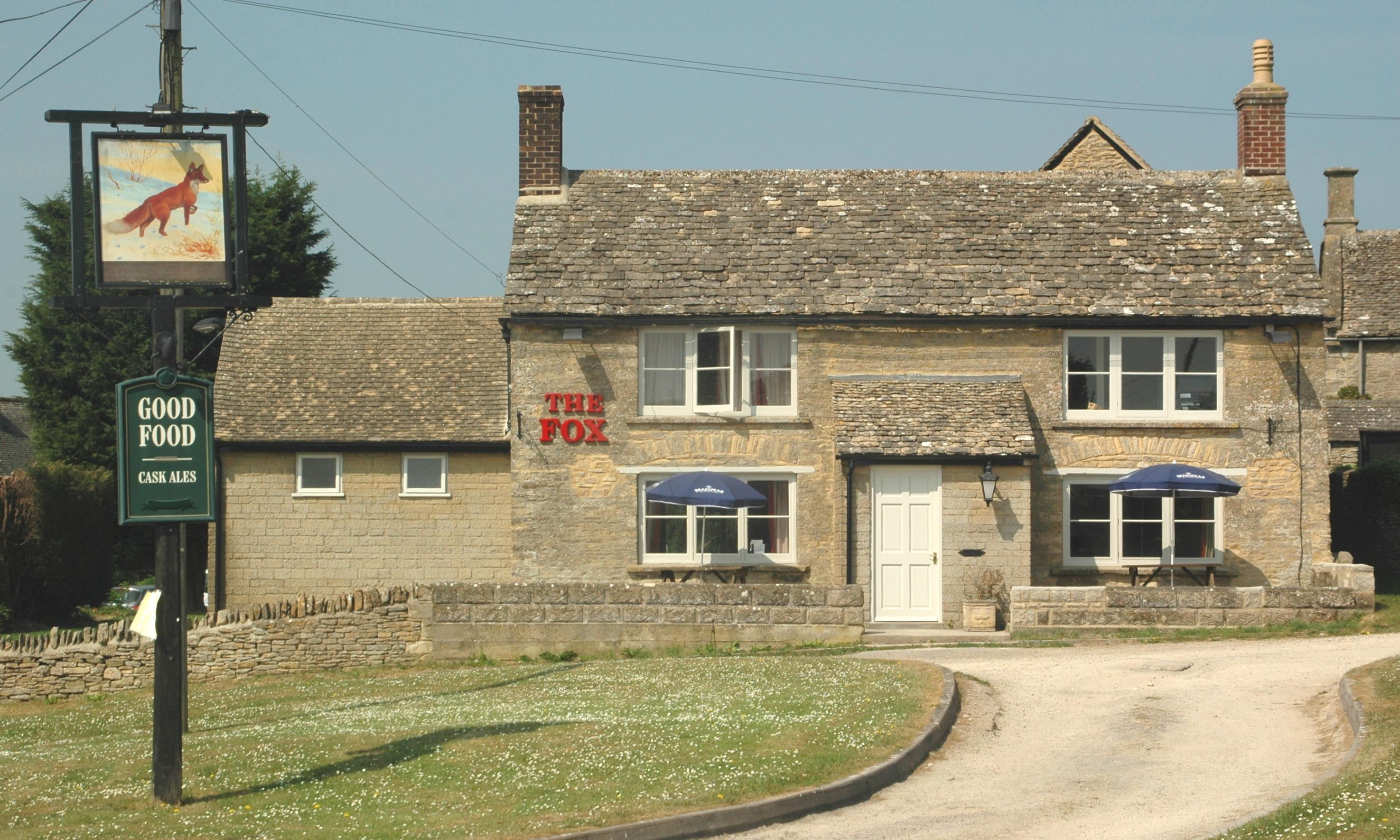
The Fox public house

== Sources ==
- Marples, B.J. (1973). "The Medieval Crosses of Oxfordshire". Oxoniensia. XXXVIII. Oxfordshire Architectural and Historical Society: 307.
- Saint, Andrew (1970). "Three Oxford Architects". Oxoniensia. XXXV. Oxford Architectural and Historical Society: 98.
- Sherwood, Jennifer; Pevsner, Nikolaus (1974). Oxfordshire. The Buildings of England. Harmondsworth: Penguin Books. p. 682. ISBN 0-14-071045-0.
- Taylor, Christopher (1982) [1975]. Fields in the English Landscape. Archaeology in the Field Series. London: J.M. Dent & Sons Ltd. pp. 145–146. ISBN 0-460-02232-6.
