= Lyneham Longbarrow =

Long barrow in Oxfordshire, England

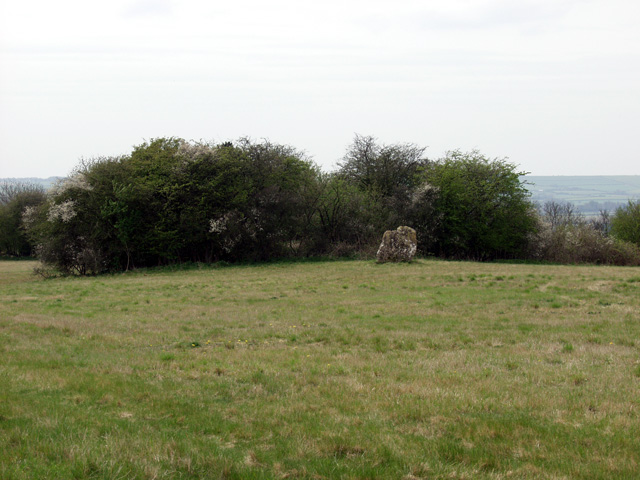

- Location in Oxfordshire
- 51.88721°N 1.56914°W
- Type: Long barrow
- Periods: Neolithic
- Location: Lyneham, Oxfordshire

Lyneham Longbarrow (grid reference SP297210) is a long barrow near Lyneham, Oxfordshire. It is beside the A361 road, between Shipton-under-Wychwood and Chipping Norton. Just nine metres from the barrow mound stands a 1.8-metre-tall (5.9 ft) standing stone.

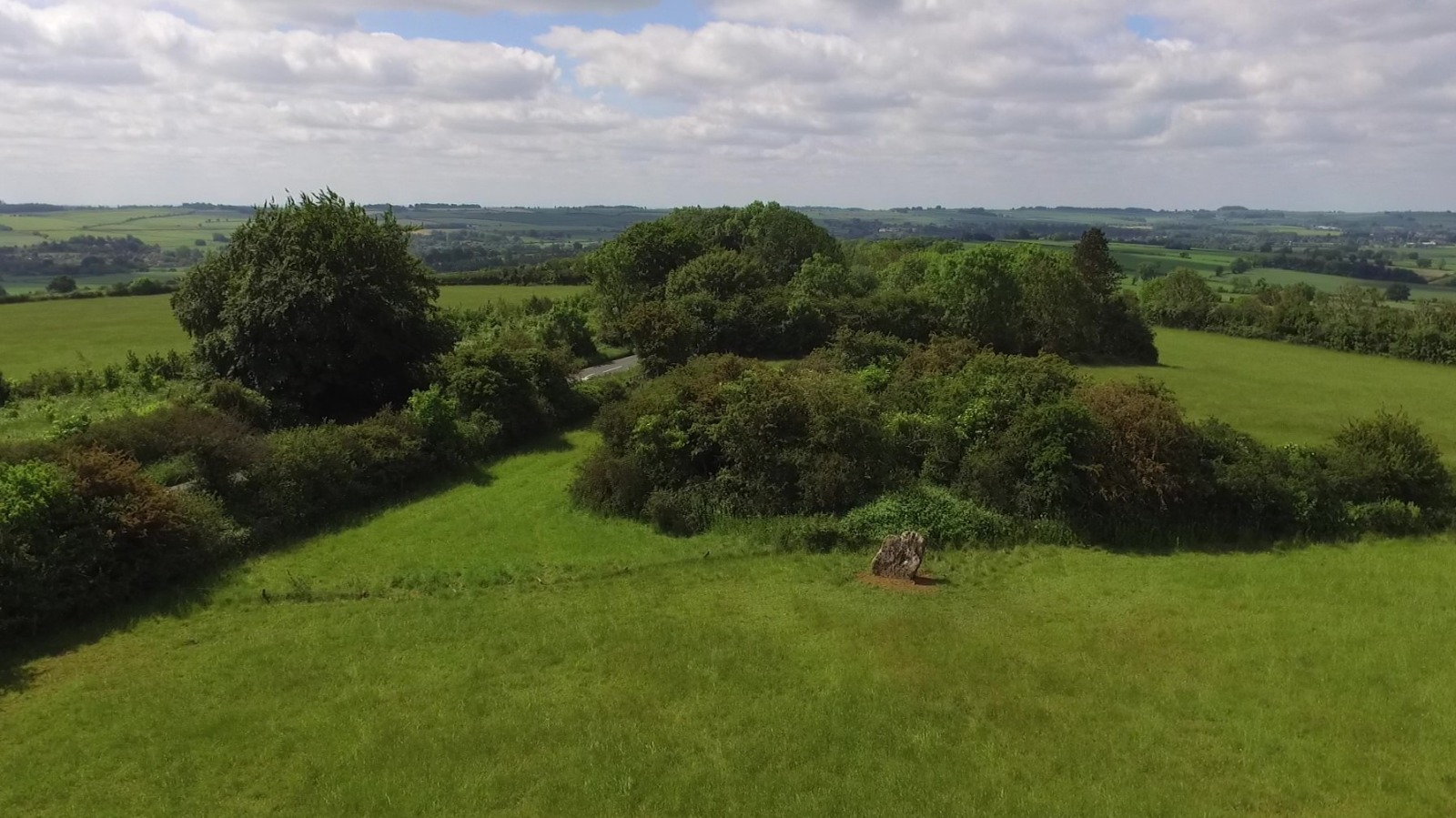
Drone's eye view of the Lyneham Barrow standing stone

== Description ==
Lyneham barrow stands on a ridge overlooking valleys to the northwest and southeast. The long barrow mound is 52 metres long, 19 metres wide and stands up to 1.75 metres high. Next to it is a weathered sandstone megalith 1.8 metres in height above ground level, 2.0 metres in width and 0.5 metres thick. The stone may have been part of a facade of standing stones.

== Excavations ==
The barrow was excavated in 1894. The excavations located two chambers on the southeast side of the mound and at least one of these contained bone fragments, pottery and charcoal. Also found were two Anglo-Saxon burials which had been cut into the top of the existing mound.
