= Leafield Castle =

Castle in Oxfordshire, England

- Leafield, Oxfordshire, England

Site information
- Condition: Earthworks only

Location
- Shown within Oxfordshire
- Coordinates: 51.83641°N 1.54262°W
- Grid reference: grid reference SP31611541

Leafield Castle (also known as Leafield Barrow) is a motte castle in the village of Leafield in the north west region of Oxfordshire. All that is left of the castle are the earthworks and the earth mound that formed the centre of the castle. It has a commanding view and is 220 metres (720 ft) north west of the Church of St Michael and All Angels. The castle is similar in size and shape to the nearby Ascot d'Oilly Castle.

The motte measures 38 metres (125 ft) across and stands up to 4 metres (13 ft) high. It has a flat, oval summit which measures 19.9 metres (65 ft) from north west to south east and 12 metres (39 ft) from south west to north east. A square feature measuring 10.9 metres (36 ft) across with an internal depression 7.5 metres (25 ft) square and 0.3 metres (1 ft 0 in) deep is believed to indicate the remains of the stone keep building. On the opening of a barrow in 1828, some ancient coins were dug up.

The village of Leafield itself is very old and was established by at least the 11th century, but there are few medieval remains and these are limited to features in houses that were later extensively rebuilt. This would mean that there could have been a castle guarding over the village from the 11th century onwards. This castle would have influence over the royal forest of Wychwood, a key centre for hunting as well as royal visits.

== See also ==
- Castles in Great Britain and Ireland
- List of Castles in England
