= Ascott Earl Castle =

Castle in Ascott-under-Wychwood, Oxfordshire, England

- Ascott Earl, Oxfordshire, England
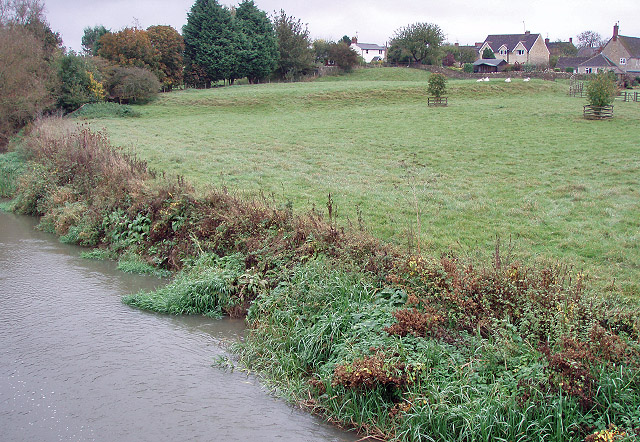
- Motte and bailey remains of the castle in the background

Site information
- Condition: Earthworks only

Location
- Shown within Oxfordshire
- Location within Oxfordshire
- Coordinates: 51.8634°N 1.5701°W
- Grid reference: grid reference SP297184

Ascott Earl Castle was a castle in the village of Ascott Earl, Oxfordshire, England.

== Details ==
Ascott Earl Castle was built in the village of Ascott Earl, to a motte-and-bailey design. The castle is very close to the fortification of Ascot d'Oilly Castle, built on an adjacent estate at the other end of the village. Ascott Earl Castle lies on former Iron Age fortifications; its motte is 56m wide and 3.5m high; the surrounding bailey is in the shape of a crescent, approximately 70m by 30m wide.

Today the castle is a scheduled monument.

== Bibliography ==
- Creighton, Oliver Hamilton. (2005) Castles and Landscapes: Power, Community and Fortification in Medieval England. London: Equinox. ISBN 978-1-904768-67-8.

== See also ==
- Castles in Great Britain and Ireland
- List of castles in England
