= Ramsden, Oxfordshire =

Village in Oxfordshire, England

Coordinates: 51.837°N 1.437°W

Ramsden
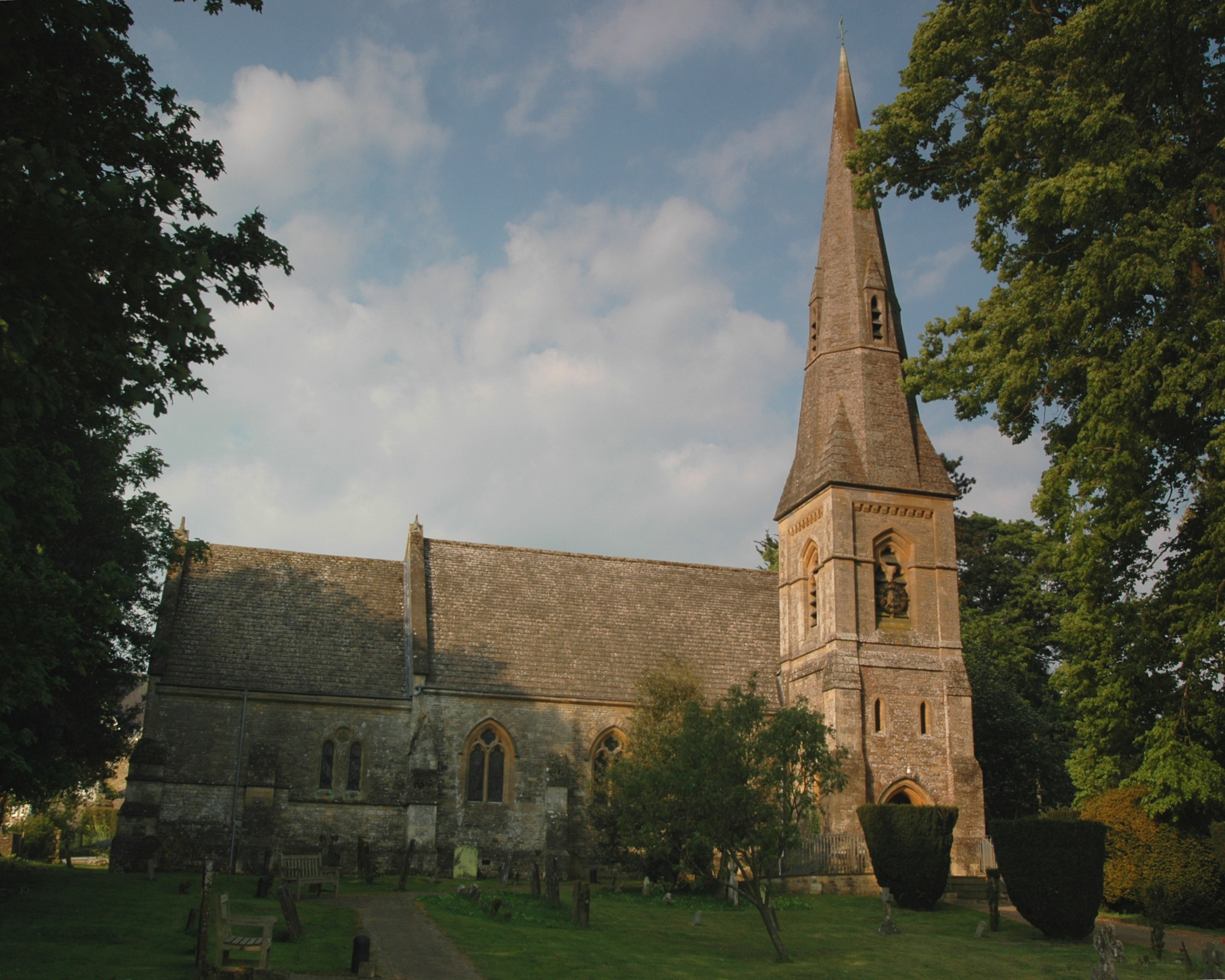
- St James' parish church

- Location within Oxfordshire
- Population: 342 (2011 census)
- OS grid reference: SP3515
- Civil parish: Ramsden
- District: West Oxfordshire
- Shire county: Oxfordshire
- Region: South East
- Country: England
- Sovereign state: United Kingdom
- Post town: Chipping Norton
- Postcode district: OX7
- Dialling code: 01993
- Police: Thames Valley
- Fire: Oxfordshire
- Ambulance: South Central
- UK Parliament: Witney
- Website: Ramsden in the Oxfordshire Cotswolds

Ramsden is a village and civil parish about 3 1/2 miles (5.6 km) north of Witney in West Oxfordshire. The 2011 census recorded the parish's population as 342.

== Archaeology ==
In the western part of the parish, about 1 mile (1.6 km) west of the village and just off the road to Leafield, is a bowl barrow. It is about 22 metres (72 ft) wide and 0.5 metres (1 ft 8 in) high, and is surrounded by the remains of a ditch that would originally have been about 2 metres (6 ft 7 in) wide. The barrow is either Bronze Age or late Neolithic, and therefore dating from between 2400 and 1500 BC. It is a Scheduled Ancient Monument.

There is a 440-yard (400 m) length of Grim's Ditch on a north–south axis just west of Ramsden village. It may be Iron Age or post-Roman. The course of Akeman Street Roman Road linking Cirencester with London passes through the parish, bisecting the village. It is now part of the Wychwood Way long-distance path. The site of a Roman villa or bath house has been found at Brize Lodge Farm, west of the village and just west of the bowl barrow. Artefacts recovered include a bronze figurine of a dove-like bird.

== Chapels and church ==
Ramsden Methodist chapel in the High Street was built in 1804. It is now a private house. In the Church of England, Ramsden used to be a dependent chapelry of the parish of Shipton-under-Wychwood. In 1848 the Anglican chapel was described as being "of recent date". The architect William Wilkinson designed Ramsden parsonage, which was built in 1862. It is now Ramsden House. In 1872 the Church of England chapel was replaced by the present parish church of St James. It was designed by the Gothic Revival architect Arthur Blomfield in an Early English Gothic style. Its bell tower has a broach spire and a set of three bells.

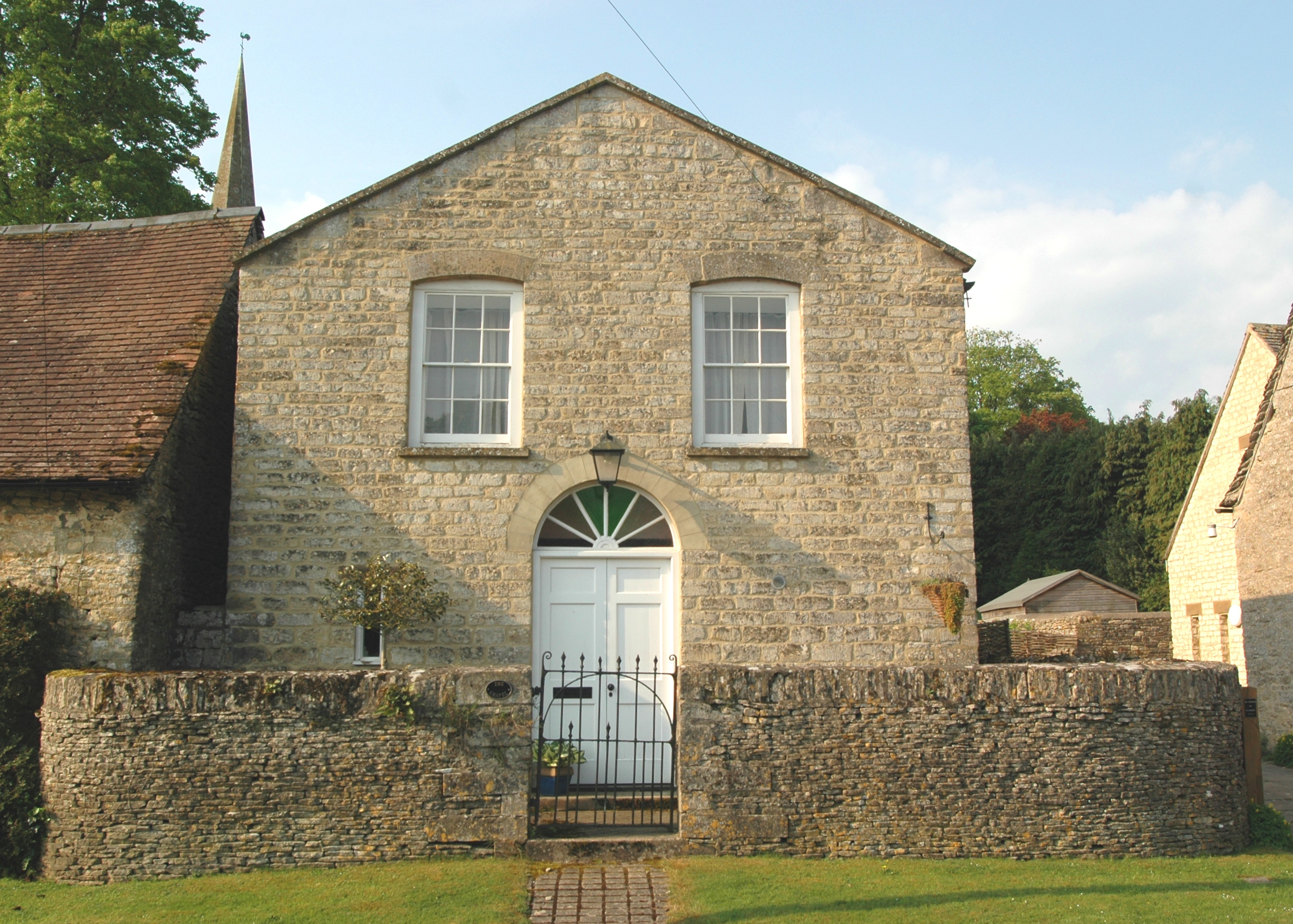
Former Methodist chapel, built 1804

== Economic and social history ==
Ramsden is a linear village, lying east–west along an old road that intersects Akeman Street. Wychwood Lodge in the High Street was built late in the 16th century and had been extended by the middle of the 17th century. It is built of coursed Cotswold stone rubble with ashlar dressings and has a Stonesfield slate roof. The front doorway and the main ground floor fireplace are Tudor. The house is a Grade II* listed building. Trades in Ramsden included a forge and attached cottage that were built in the middle of the 18th century. The forge is no longer trading, and has been converted into part of the attached cottage.

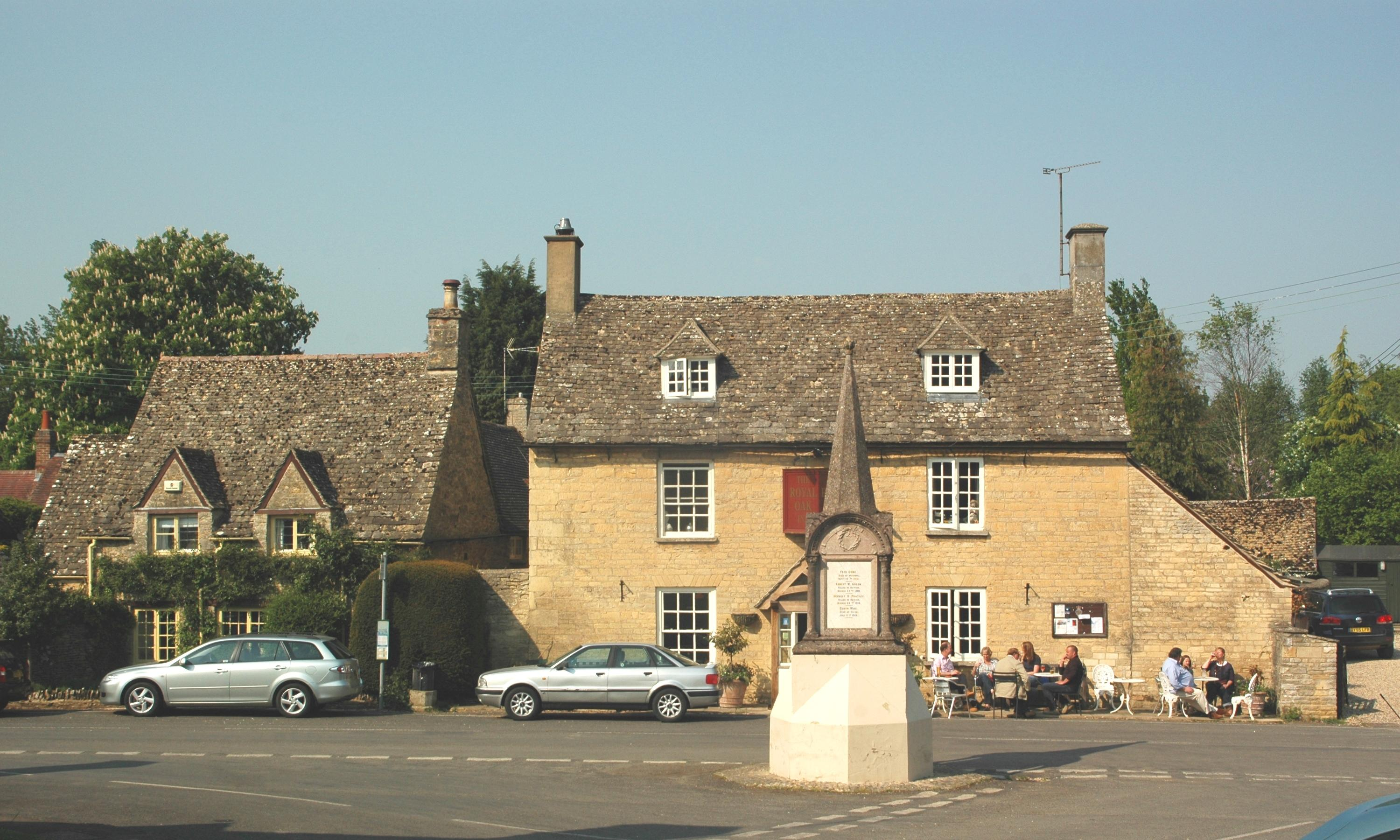
Akeman cottage (left), the Royal Oak public house (right) and parish war memorial (foreground)

== Amenities ==
The Memorial Hall is Ramsden's village hall. It is converted from a former barn in the High Street and commemorates the men of the parish who died in the First and Second World Wars. There is also a war memorial in the form of a stone obelisk in the centre of the village in front of the Royal Oak. Ramsden has a public house, the Royal Oak, that was built in 1660. In 2019 it was purchased by a local resident. It was closed to undergo a complete refurbishment which is now fully open with five bedrooms and serves meals.

== Sources ==
- Henig, Martin; Chambers, R.A. (1984). "Two Roman Bronze Birds from Oxfordshire". Oxoniensia. XLVIII. Oxfordshire Architectural and Historical Society: 19–21. ISSN 0308-5562.
- Lewis, Samuel, ed. (1931) [1848]. A Topographical Dictionary of England (Seventh ed.). London: Samuel Lewis. pp. 633–638.
- Sherwood, Jennifer; Pevsner, Nikolaus (1974). Oxfordshire. The Buildings of England. Harmondsworth: Penguin Books. p. 734. ISBN 0-14-071045-0.
