= Margaret Jope =

British biochemist and archaeologist

- Born: Henrietta Margaret Halliday; 1913; Peterhead, Scotland
- Died: 2004 (aged 90–91)
- Education: University of Aberdeen; Somerville College, Oxford
- Scientific career
- Workplaces: Dyson Perrins Laboratory; Queens University

Margaret Jope (1913–2004) was a Scottish biochemist, born Henrietta Margaret Halliday in Peterhead, Scotland. She carried out research into brachiopods.

== Biography ==
She took her degree in chemistry at the University of Aberdeen, and her DPhil at Somerville College, Oxford. She met her future husband Martyn Jope while working at the Dyson Perrins Laboratory at University of Oxford. After their marriage she accompanied him to Belfast, where he later became Professor of Archaeology at Queen's University.

Margaret continued her research while at Belfast, in the Geology Department, where she worked primarily on brachiopods, especially on their shell protein. Her other research interests included the crystallisation of haemoglobin, and working with Martyn, made studies of animal bones, especially bird bones, at archaeological sites mainly in Northern Ireland and Oxfordshire.

== Papers on brachiopods ==
- H M Jope, "Composition of Brachiopod Shell", "Treatise on Invertebrate Palaeontology", ed. R C Moore, Brachiopoda, vol H, University of Kansas Press?, 1965, p H156–H164.
- H M Jope, "The Protein of Brachiopod Shell I: Amino acid composition and implied protein taxonomy", Comp. Biochem. Physiol., 20 (1967), p 593–600.
- H M Jope, "The protein of Brachiopod Shell II: Shell protein from fossil articulates: amino acid composition", Comp. Biochem. Physiol., 20 (1967), p 601–605.
- H M Jope, "The Protein of Brachiopod Shell III: Comparison with structural protein of soft tissue", Comp. Biochem. Physiol., 30 (1969), p 209–224.
- H M Jope, "The Protein of Brachiopod Shell IV: Shell protein from fossil inarticulates: amino acid composition and Disc Electrophoresis of fossil articulate shell protein", Comp. Biochem. Physiol., 30 (1969), p 225–232.
- H M Jope, "Constituents of Brachiopod Shells", Comprehensive Biochemistry, ed. M Florkin and E H Stotz, 26C (1971), p 749–784.
- H M Jope, "The Protein of Brachiopod Shell V: N-terminal End Groups", Comp. Biochem. Physiol., 45B (1973), p 17–24.
- H M Jope, "Brachiopod Shell Proteins: Their functions and taxonomic significance", American Zoology, 17 (1977), p 133–140.
- H M Jope, "The Protein of Brachiopod Shell VI: C Terminal end groups and sodium dodecyl sulphate-polyacrylamide gel electrophoresis: molecular constitution and structure of the protein", Comp. Biochem. Physiol., 63B (1979), p 163–173.
- H M Jope, "Phylogenetic Information derivable from Fossil Brachiopods", Biogeochemistry of Amino Acids, ed. P E Hare, Wiley, 1980, p 83–94.
- H M Jope, "Evolution of Brachiopods: The Molecular Approach", Les Brachiopoda, Fossils et Actuels, ed. P R Racheboeuf and C C Emig, Brest, 1985, p 103–111.
