= Martyn Jope =

English archaeologist and chemist

Edward Martyn Jope (28 December 1915 – 14 November 1996) was an English archaeologist and chemist. He worked temporarily during the Second World War as a biochemist. Following the war, he returned to working in archaeology, first as a medievalist and later as a prehistorian.

== Life and career ==
Martyn Jope studied at Oriel College, Oxford. While studying for his first degree in chemistry, he worked intensively on the archaeology of the city of Oxford. Soon he joined the Oxford University Archaeological Society and in due course became secretary and president.

His first appointment was in 1938 by the Royal Commission on the Ancient and Historical Monuments of Wales. Until the outbreak of World War II, he excavated the medieval settlement of Bere together with R. I. Threlfall, near the village of North Tawton on the River Taw in Devon and created one of the first recorded plans of an English medieval farmhouse.

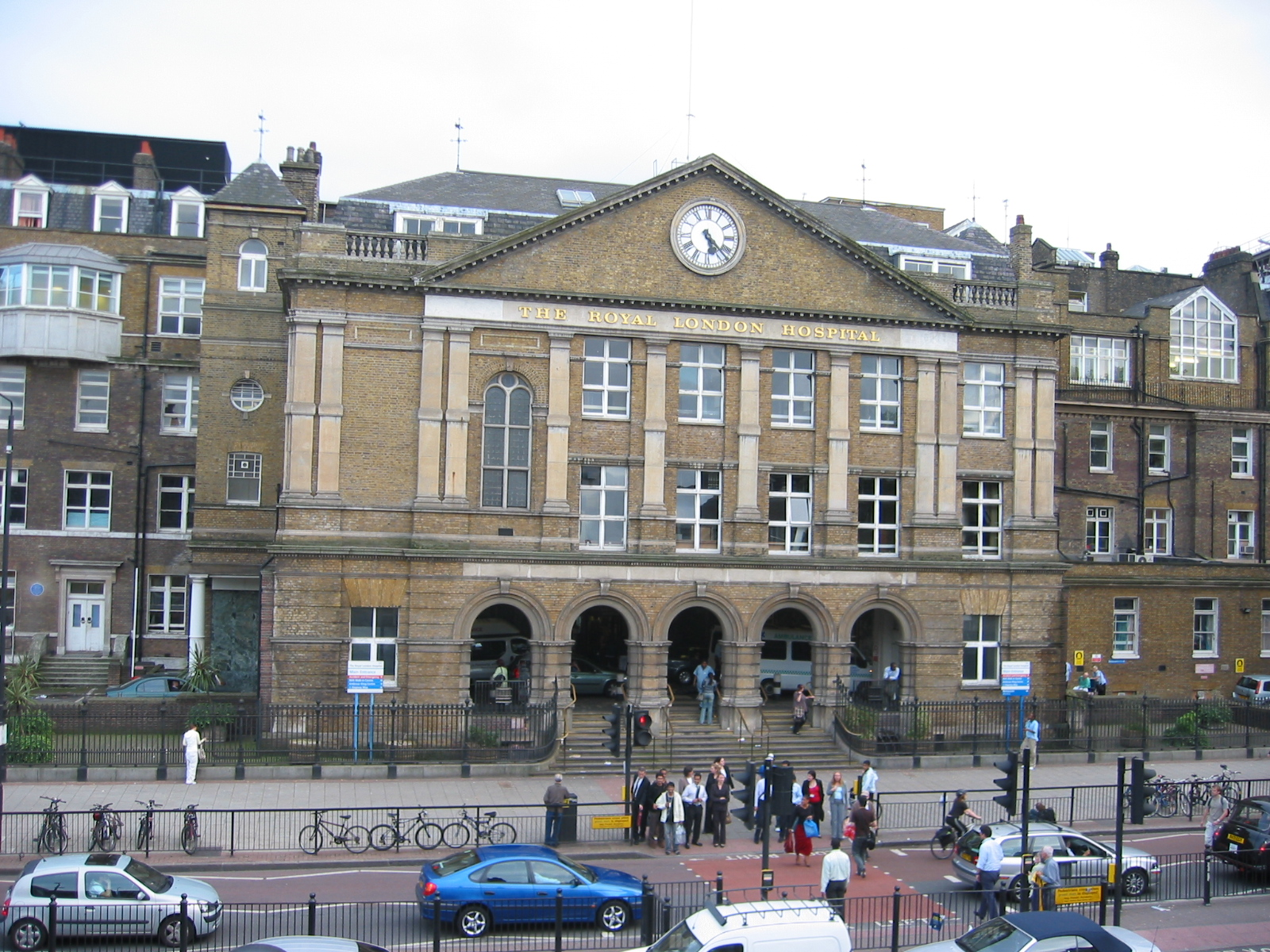
The London Hospital (now the Royal London Hospital) in Whitechapel

During World War II, he temporarily gave up the archaeology and received in 1940 a grant from the Nuffield Foundation for the study of haemoglobins in human blood at the London Hospital in Whitechapel. Later, the Medical Research Council supported his research on the application of spectroscopic methods and chemical-biological spectro-microscopy for biological studies, but later he moved back towards archaeology. In 1946, Jope was elected a Fellow of the Society of Antiquaries of London.

In 1949, Jope received a call for a new post as a lecturer of archaeology at Queen's University Belfast at the suggestion of geography Professor Emyr Estyn Evans. This lectureship has evolved into a department under Jope, first as a lecturer from 1954 to 1963, and then as professor from 1963 until his retirement in 1981.

Jope maintained a house in Oxford for his holidays and later retirement. He used this as the basis for his English field work, especially on the subject of medieval pottery in the southwest of England. From there, he has excavated Ascot d'Oilly Castle, Deddington Castle, the medieval pottery kilns at Brill and some medieval sites in Oxford.

He devoted himself to various parts of the provincial archaeology publications on topics such as the Neolithic Axe trade, metalwork from the Iron Age, the raths and earthworks of the early Christian period, such as the fort of Dunglady, medieval castles and the houses of the plantations of the 18th century.

The result was the publication of the magisterial archaeological survey of County Down in 1966. This was the first systematic examination of the entire Archaeology of an Irish county.

In 1963 he became a Fellow of the British Academy. Until the early 1960s he was one of the main actors in the development of the archaeology of the Middle Ages either by the survey of buildings, by the study of ceramics or by being one of the first teams excavating a medieval city. His attention then turned to more research on the Iron Age, in particular the completion of a book on the art of this period in the British Isles. He published his preliminary studies on the subject, but unfortunately he did not survive the final release of the entire work.

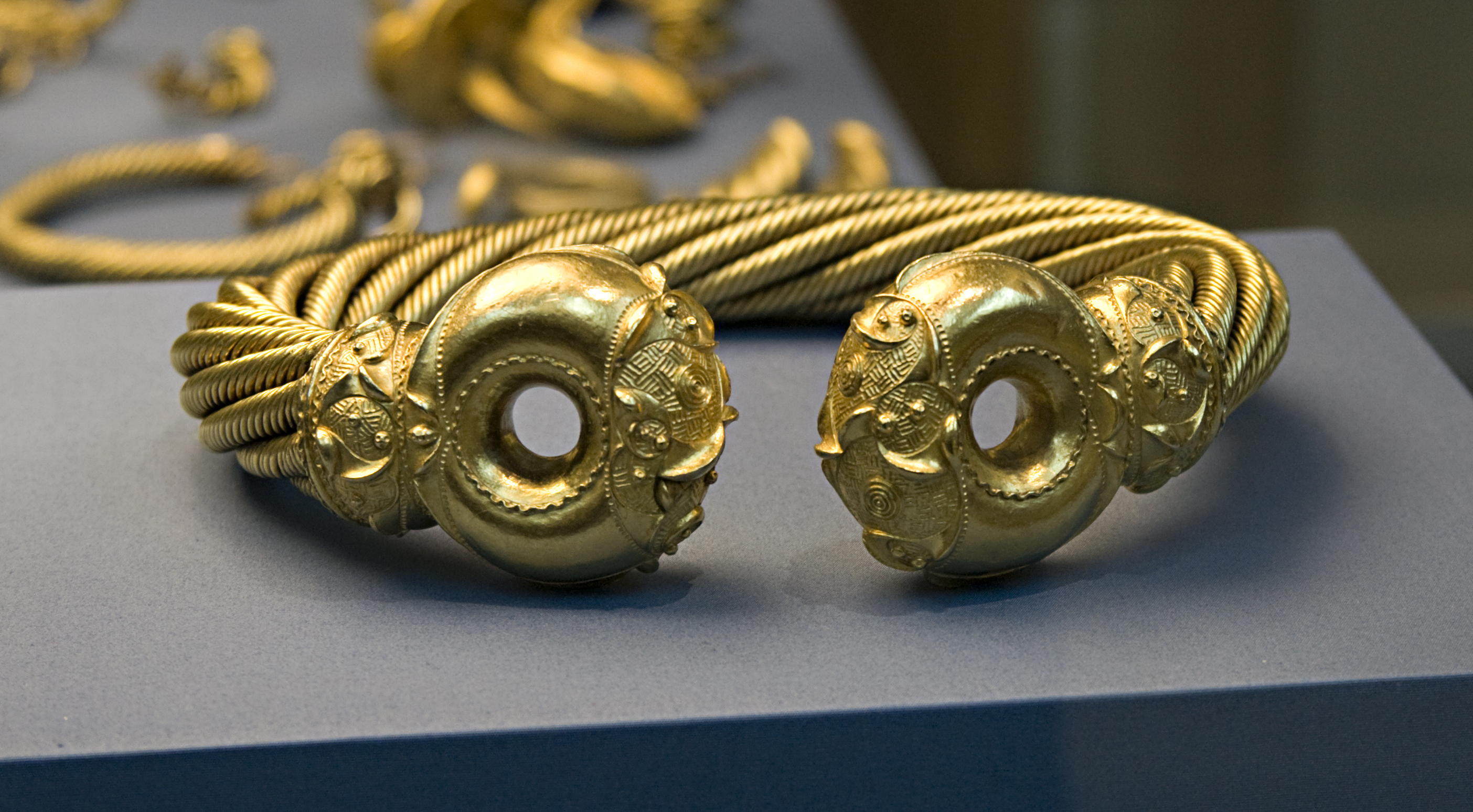
Celtic Art - The "Great Torc" from the Snettisham Hoard, 1st century BC.

The two-volume work, "Early Celtic Art in the British Isles" was published posthumously and provides a comprehensive analysis of the development of the Celtic designs from the 4th century BC to the beginnings of the British Romanization in the 1st century AD. Jope showed the unique traces of the origins of art on the islands of Great Britain by a variety of art objects, especially swords, scabbards and brooches, and examined the development of the decoration of ceremonial armour and shields. The use of gold in the 3rd century BC and images of humans, animals and plants are also discussed and compared in the whole work amongst each other and with Celtic artefacts. Weapons, armour, vessels, mirrors, jewellery and horse equipment illustrate the sophistication of Celtic designs. A large part of the study to take a single Celtic design elements, such as the use of S-shapes and spirals, the principles of design and metal working techniques and tools.

He led the campaign of the British Academy for a separate state funds for archaeological research since 1976 and served in its first science-based Archaeology Committee. The creation of the Department of Archaeological Sciences at the University of Bradford goes back to his inspiration. He was a visiting professor there 1974–81 and was an honorary visiting professor from 1982 to 1996. Jope's enormous contribution to medieval and modern Irish Archaeology earned him membership of the Royal Irish Academy in 1973. He was a member of the Royal Commission on the Ancient and Historical Monuments of Wales from 1963 to 1986 and the Royal Commission on the Historical Monuments of England from 1980 to 1984.

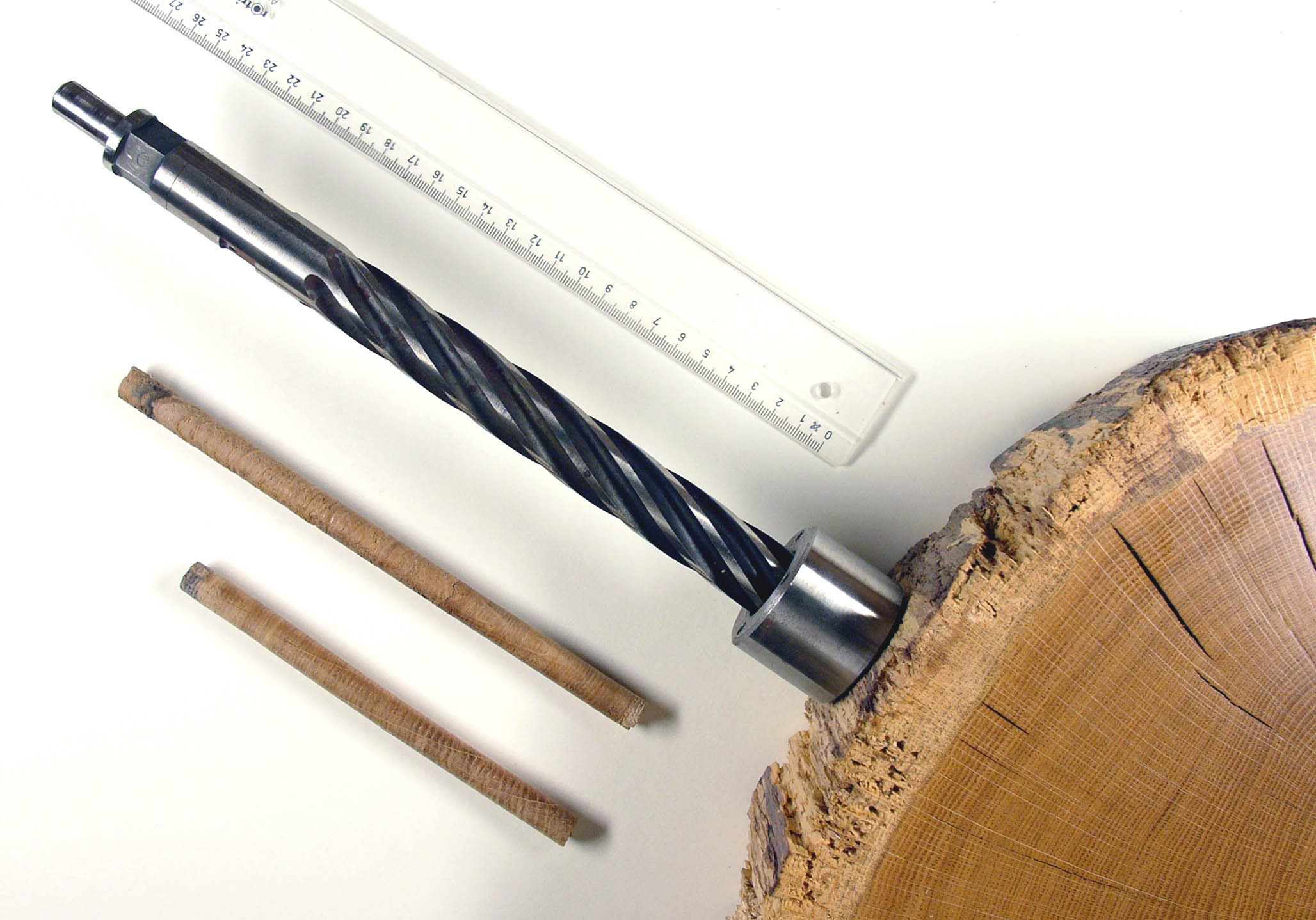
Dendrochronology sampling and growth ring counting

Jope used his archaeological and scientific knowledge to inspire the creation of the Institute of Archaeological Sciences at the University of Bradford, and as co-director of the palaeoecological Centre at Queen's University in Belfast, to motivate his staff in their work on dendrochronology and studies to guide the radiocarbon dating.

== Work ethos ==
His work always began with close observation of the individual sites or artefacts. He asked that any statement should be based on facts, regardless of whether this was a publication, a student work or the widespread beliefs. He expressed the conviction that the social and economic reasons why people have an artefact or a building or used, are an important part of the study.

== Family ==
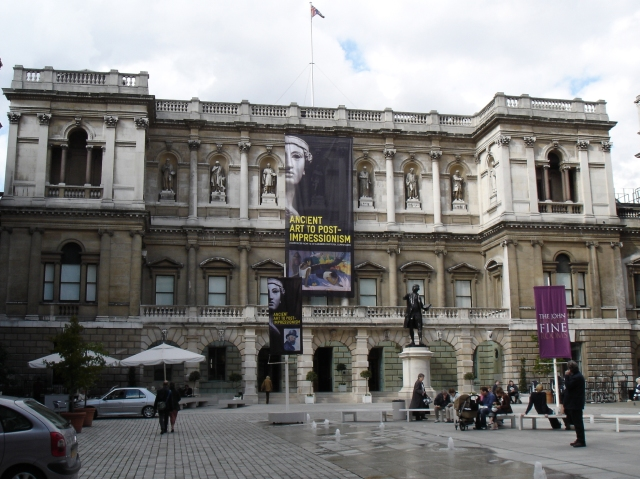
Burlington House in London

Martyn Jope married Margaret Halliday in 1941. They were closely linked together and shared all aspects of life, from biology to music. Margaret was a biochemist and an archaeologist, and like him a Fellow of the Society of Antiquaries. They were regular visitors at Burlington House together, both during the semester break of Queen's University and after retirement.

== Published works ==
- E. M. Jope and G. Huse: Blue Pigment of Roman date from Woodeaton, Oxoniensia, Vol V, Page 167, 1940.
- R. L. S. Bruce Mitford and E. M. Jope: Eleventh- and Twelfth- Century Pottery from the Oxford Region, Oxoniensia, Vol V, Page 42, 1940.
- Further publications in Oxoniensia
- E. M. Jope and R. I. Threlfall, Excavation of a medieval settlement at Beere, North Tawton, Devon, Med. Archaeol., 11 (1958), Pages 121–122.
- E. M. Jope: Ancient monuments of Northern Ireland. Northern Ireland Ministry, Nr. 2, 1969.
- J.Z. Young, Royal Society (Great Britain), British Academy, E. M. Jope and Kenneth Page Oakley: The Emergence of Man: A Joint Symposium of the Royal Society and the British Academy. January 1981, ISBN 0-85403-152-9
- E. M. Jope, D. Ellis Evans, John G. Griffith: Proceedings of the Seventh International Congress of Celtic Studies Held at Oxford, from 10th to 15th July, 1983, January 1986, ISBN 0-9511269-0-3

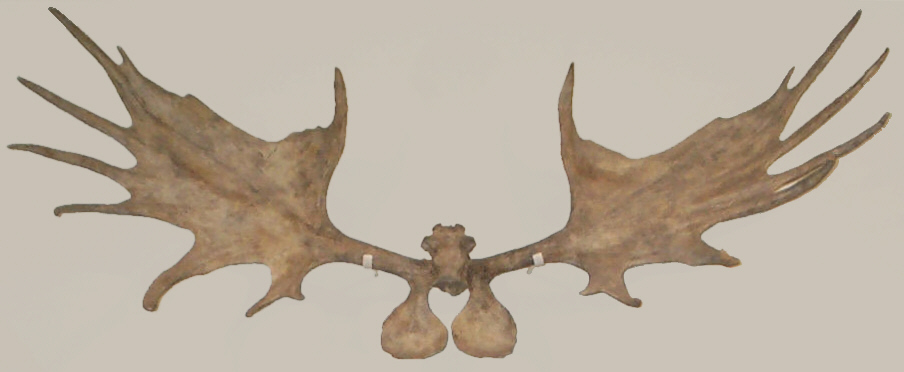
Antler of a giant deer, Megaloceros giganteus antecedens, width approx. 2.60 m

- E. M. Jope and H. M. Jope: Note on collagen molecular preservation in an 11 ka old Megaceros (Giant Deer) antler: solubilization in a non-aqueous medium (anhydrous formic acid). Applied Geochemistry, Band 4, Heft 3, Mai-Juni 1989, Seiten 301-302, First International Workshop on Fossil Bone.
- E. M. Jope: Bersu's Goldberg IV: A Petty Chief's Establishment of the 6th–5th Centuries, B.C.Oxford Journal of Archaeology, (1997), 16: 227–241. doi:10.1111/1468-0092.00037
- E. M. Jope: Early Celtic Art in the British Isles., Oxford University Press, 2000. ISBN 978-0-19-817318-2
