= Ascott Earl =

Village in Oxfordshire, England

Coordinates: 51.864°N 01.57°W

- Location within Oxfordshire
- OS grid reference: SP2918
- Civil parish: Ascott-under-Wychwood
- District: West Oxfordshire
- Shire county: Oxfordshire
- Region: South East
- Country: England
- Sovereign state: United Kingdom
- Police: Thames Valley
- Fire: Oxfordshire
- Ambulance: South Central
- UK Parliament: Witney

Ascott Earl is a village in Oxfordshire, England. There are the remains of a motte-and-bailey castle beside the river Evenlode.

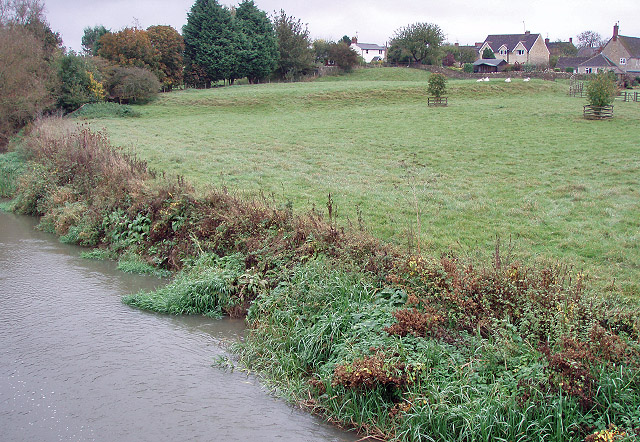
Motte and Bailey, Ascott Earl
