= Joop (disambiguation) =

Joop is a Dutch masculine given name. It may also refer to:

- JOOP!, a German fashion house
- Wolfgang Joop (born 1944), German fashion designer and founder of JOOP!
- Journal of Occupational and Organizational Psychology, an academic journal published on behalf of the British Psychological Society
- Journal of Object-Oriented Programming, a journal that ran from 1988 to 2001 and was then superseded by The Journal of Object Technology
