= Ascott-under-Wychwood =

Village in Oxfordshire, England

Coordinates: 51.872°N 1.565°W

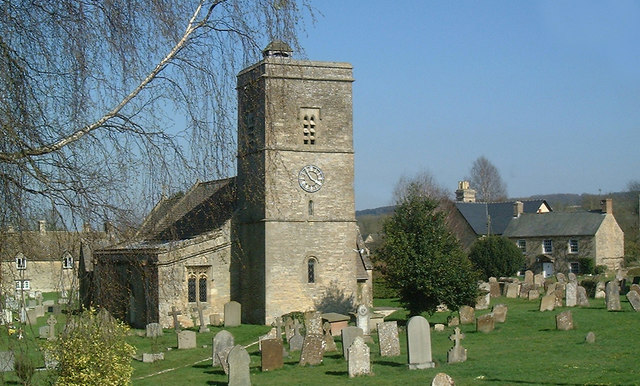
- Holy Trinity parish church

- Location within Oxfordshire
- Population: 560 (2011 Census)
- OS grid reference: SP3018
- Civil parish: Ascott-under-Wychwood
- District: West Oxfordshire
- Shire county: Oxfordshire
- Region: South East
- Country: England
- Sovereign state: United Kingdom
- Post town: Chipping Norton
- Postcode district: OX7
- Dialling code: 01993
- Police: Thames Valley
- Fire: Oxfordshire
- Ambulance: South Central
- UK Parliament: Witney
- Website: Ascott-under-Wychwood Community Website

Ascott-under-Wychwood is a village and civil parish in the West Oxfordshire district, in Oxfordshire, England, in the Evenlode valley about 4.5 miles (7 km) south of Chipping Norton, Oxfordshire. The 2011 Census recorded the parish's population as 560.

== Toponym ==
The village is one of three named after the historic forest of Wychwood; the others being Shipton-under-Wychwood and Milton-under-Wychwood. “Ascott” is derived from the Old English ēast (east) and cot (cottage).

== Manor and castle ==
Ascot d'Oilly Castle was built in about 1129–50 and a stone tower was added to it in the 13th century. The castle bailey is now occupied by the manor house, which is mainly 16th and 17th century but contains some 13th century buttressed and other stonework.

== Parish church ==
Holy Trinity Church of England parish church was built in about 1200 in a transitional style from Norman to Early English. Surviving transitional work includes the south porch, and the four-bay arcade between the nave and the north aisle. The chancel arch and the lancet windows along the side of the north aisle are Early English. Most of the present windows in the nave and chancel were inserted in the 14th and 15th centuries, including the Decorated Gothic east windows of the chancel and north aisle and the Perpendicular Gothic south windows of the chancel and west window of the aisle. Also Perpendicular Gothic are the chancel piscina and sedilia, the octagonal baptismal font and a small chapel next to the chancel.

The upper stages of the bell tower were built in the 15th century. The building was restored in 1857–59 under the direction of the Oxford Diocesan architect G.E. Street. Holy Trinity is a Grade II* listed building. The tower has a ring of six bells. Five of these including the tenor bell were cast in 1744 by Henry III Bagley of Chacombe, Northamptonshire, who at the time also had a bell-foundry at Witney. The treble was cast in 1905 by Mears and Stainbank of the Whitechapel Bell Foundry. There is also a Sanctus bell cast in 1797 by Thomas I Mears. In 2001 the Church of England Benefice of Ascott-under-Wychwood, Chadlington and Spelsbury merged with that of Enstone and Heythrop to form the Chase Benefice.

== Economic and social history ==
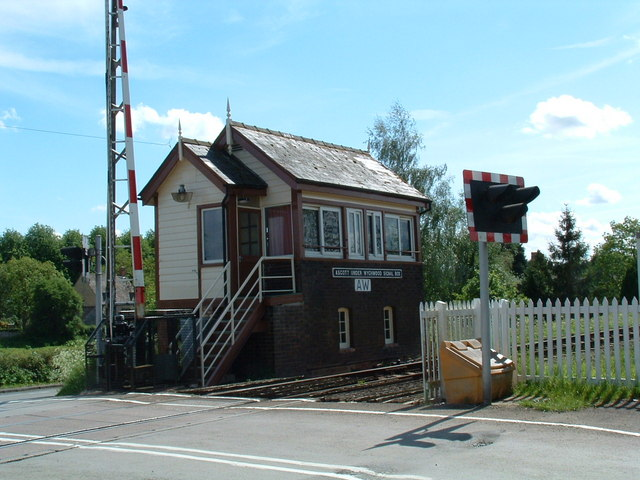
Ascott-under-Wychwood signal box, near Ascott d'Oyley

The Oxford, Worcester and Wolverhampton Railway was built in 1845 and opened Ascott-under-Wychwood railway station to serve the village. The OW&WR is now the Cotswold Line and the station is served by Great Western Railway trains. The village school was designed by the architect Clapton Rolfe and built in 1871.

In 1873 a farmer dismissed several men of Ascott-under-Wychwood because they had formed a branch of the National Union of Agricultural Workers. He hired labourers from the village of Ramsden to work as strikebreakers but a group of women from Ascott-under-Wychwood tried to dissuade the Ramsden labourers from working. Sixteen of the women were arrested, tried by magistrates in Chipping Norton and given short sentences of imprisonment in Oxford Castle. Their convictions were met with rioting in Chipping Norton, questions in Parliament and a royal pardon from Queen Victoria. The 16 are commemorated as the Ascott Martyrs.

In 1874 at least four of the women emigrated with their families to New Zealand, where they now have numerous descendants. In 1973 on the centenary of the women's ordeal a commemorative bench was erected in the village.

== Amenities ==
Ascott-under-Wychwood has a public house, The Swan. It was closed in 2010 but was re-opened in June 2013. It also has a community shop, which was opened in 2003. An art gallery and craft shop opened in 2022 owned by the Japanese artist Motoko Aritake-Wild. https://www.forgeatwychwood.co.uk The village has two schools, which are both privately funded. Ascott-under-Wychwood Pre-school which provides pre-school learning for children aged 2–5 years and Windrush Valley Private School which provides learning and education for children aged 3–11 years. The village has a cricket club, which plays on Memorial playing field, with a team in the Cherwell League on Saturdays, and friendly matches on Sundays.

== Sources ==
- Sherwood, Jennifer; Pevsner, Nikolaus (1974). Oxfordshire. The Buildings of England. Harmondsworth: Penguin Books. pp. 423–424. ISBN 0-14-071045-0.
