= Ascot d'Oilly Castle =

Castle in Oxfordshire, England

- Ascott-under-Wychwood, Oxfordshire, England
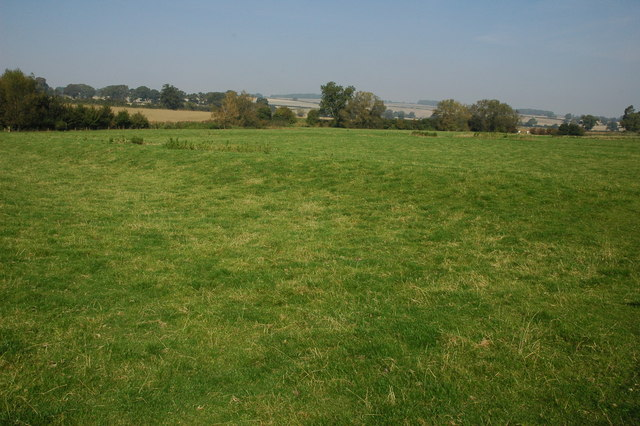
- Earthworks of the castle

Site information
- Condition: Earthworks only

Location
- Shown within Oxfordshire
- Coordinates: 51.8697°N 1.5599°W
- Grid reference: grid reference SP304191

Ascot d'Oilly Castle is situated north of the village of Ascott-under-Wychwood in north west Oxfordshire. The site is a scheduled ancient monument. It was named after Roger d'Oilly who was granted the land by William the Conqueror and whose brother built Oxford Castle. It is thought that the castle was built in the second quarter of the 12th century and it was demolished some time around 1180. The remains consist of raised ground surrounded by broad ditching, and part of a stone tower which is protected as a Grade II listed building.

Today the motte of the original castle survives as a mound, around 32 metres (105 ft) wide and 3 metres (9.8 ft) high. The ruins of the keep are situated on top of this mound in the central 20-metre (66 ft) area. It was excavated by Martyn Jope and R. I. Threlfall in 1946–1947 and then in 1959. Excavations carried out in 1946–1947 not only unearthed a number of important artefacts such as 12th-century shelly ware pottery, they also showed how earth was piled up around the outside of a square tower for fortification i.e the castle was built on ground level and then the clay mound, that survives to date, was built around it, instead of the castle being built on a raised mound from the start. Whilst an uncommon practise, similar examples of this style of construction can be found at Lydford, Caldicot, and Skenfrith, amongst others. Only traces of the tower remain and they suggest that it was about 11 square metres (120 sq ft) with walls 2 metres (6 ft 7 in) thick.

The castle is very close to the fortification of Ascott Earl Castle, built on an adjacent estate at the other end of the village. These two castles are unusual as they are in close proximity, being only 550 metres (1,800 ft) apart, yet they have never been used in armed struggle against each other. The castle is also very close to Leafield Castle with it only being 2.7 miles away. It is possible that these two fortifications are linked with the shared defence of West Oxfordshire.

== See also ==
- Castles in Great Britain and Ireland
- List of castles in England

== Bibliography ==
- Creighton, Oliver Hamilton. (2005) Castles and Landscapes: Power, Community and Fortification in Medieval England. London: Equinox. ISBN 978-1-904768-67-8.
