= Milton-under-Wychwood =

Village in Oxfordshire, England

Coordinates: 51.872°N 1.565°W

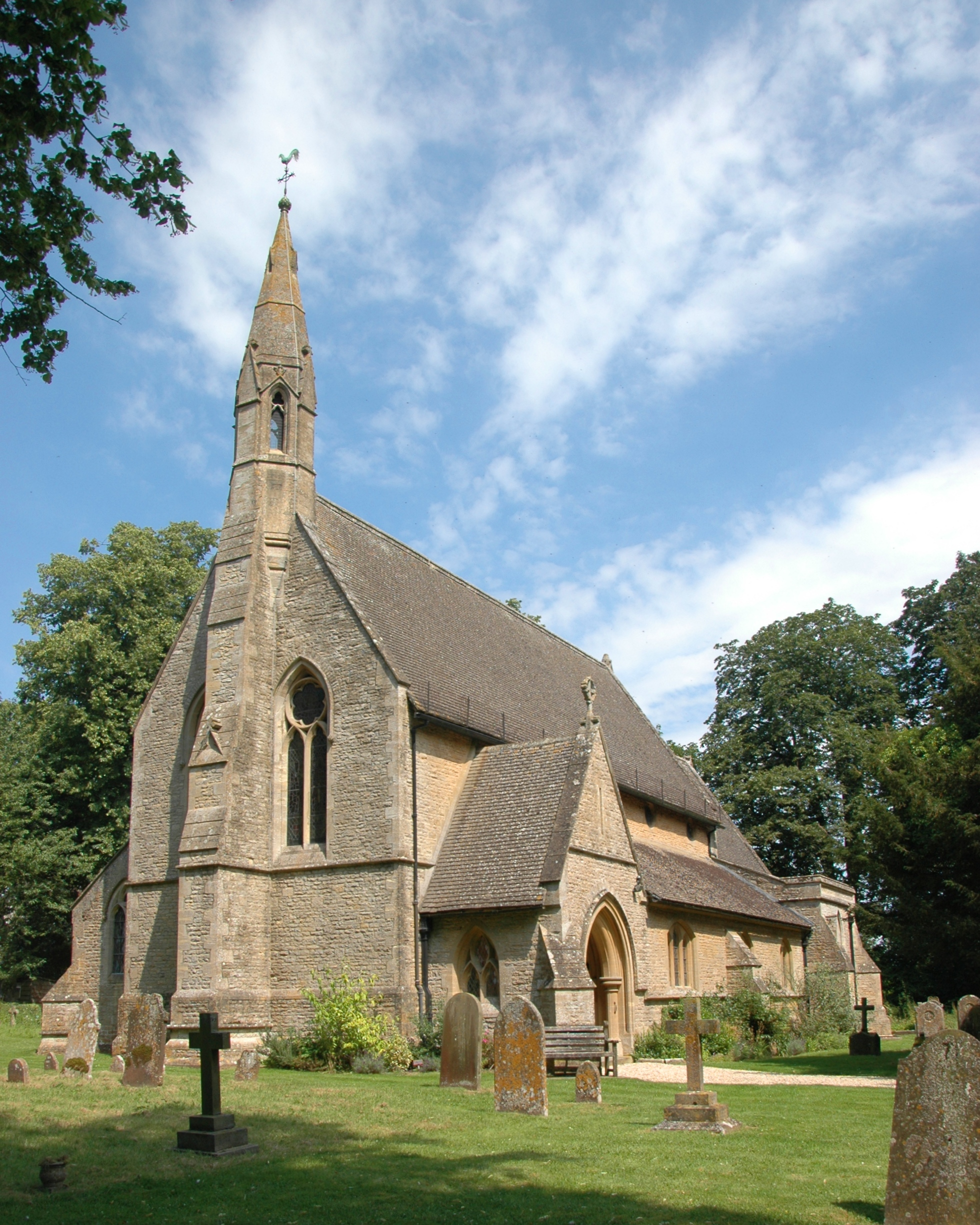
- Saints Simon and Jude parish church

- Location within Oxfordshire
- Population: 1,800 (2011 Census)
- OS grid reference: SP3018
- Civil parish: Milton-under-Wychwood
- District: West Oxfordshire
- Shire county: Oxfordshire
- Region: South East
- Country: England
- Sovereign state: United Kingdom
- Post town: CHIPPING NORTON
- Postcode district: OX7
- Dialling code: 01993
- Police: Thames Valley
- Fire: Oxfordshire
- Ambulance: South Central
- UK Parliament: Witney
- Website: Milton under Wychwood Online

Milton-under-Wychwood is an English village and civil parish in the West Oxfordshire district, in the county of Oxfordshire, England. It is about 4 miles (6.4 km) north of Burford, just off the A361 road between Burford and Chipping Norton. The 2011 Census recorded the parish's population as 1,648.

== History ==
The village is one of three named after the ancient forest of Wychwood. The others are Shipton-under-Wychwood immediately to the east of the village and Ascott-under-Wychwood about 2 miles (3 km) away. In the 18th century Milton had its own clockmaker, William Green (1722–70). The Church of England parish church of St. Simon and St. Jude was designed by the Gothic Revival architect G.E. Street and built in 1853–54. Street also designed the village school (now closed) and teacher's house, which were built at the same time.

== Amenities and economy ==
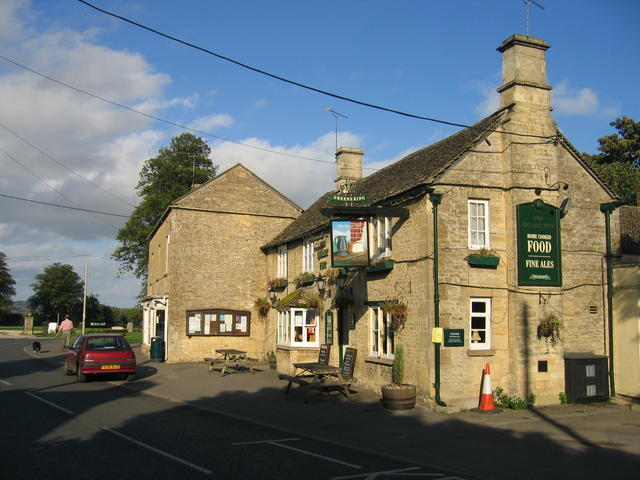
The Quart Pot public house in 2006

The village has one public house, The Hare, which is a gastropub. For many years it was the Quart Pot pub, latterly controlled by Greene King Brewery, which closed it in 2010. The brewery sold the pub, and Acres Developments of Bournemouth, Dorset, applied for planning permission to turn the pub into a house. Villagers opposed the conversion and in 2012 West Oxfordshire District Council refused to grant planning permission. Eventually two local entrepreneurs (Sue & Rachel Hawkins) bought the pub in 2015, renovated the building and in March 2016 reopened it as The Hare. Wychwood public library is in a converted shop in the village. The village has a Co-Operative shop. Shipton railway station on the Cotswold Line is 1 mile (1.6 km) away. Milton Stone is a type of Cotswold stone that has been quarried in the area since the early 14th century. It was used at St George's Chapel, Windsor (1478–83) and Christ Church, Oxford (1525), but was not thereafter used at Oxford until 1850.
