= Wychwood =

Forest near Witney, Oxfordshire, England

Coordinates: 51.851°N 1.513°W

- Site of Special Scientific Interest
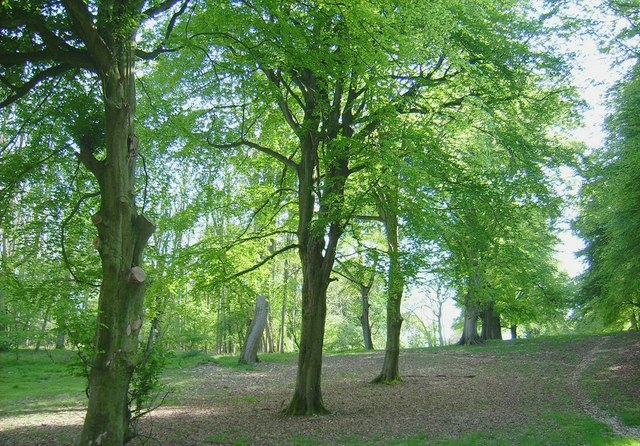
- Location of Wychwood.
- Area of search: Oxfordshire
- Grid reference: SP 337 170
- Interest: Biological
- Area: 501.7 hectares (1,240 acres)
- Notification date: 1988
- Location map: Magic Map

Wychwood or Wychwood Forest is a 501.7-hectare (1,240-acre) biological Site of Special Scientific Interest north of Witney in Oxfordshire. It is also a Nature Conservation Review site, Grade 1, and an area of 263.4 hectares (651 acres) is a national nature reserve The site contains a long barrow dating to the Neolithic period, which is a scheduled monument.

In past centuries the forest covered a much larger area, since cleared in favour of agriculture, villages and towns. However, the forest's area has fluctuated. Parts cleared for agriculture during Britain's centuries under Roman rule later reverted to forest. The existence of the ancient Wychwood is recognised by the authoritative Victoria County History, but the planned Volume XIX has yet to be completed.

== Etymology ==
Wychwood is derived from an Old English name Huiccewudu meaning 'wood of a tribe called the Hwicce. The Hwicce were the Anglo-Saxon people living in the area from some time in the 6th century until the assimilation of the Old English peoples into the wider Middle English society.

== Toponymy ==
Three villages take part of their name from Wychwood Forest: Milton-under-Wychwood, Shipton-under-Wychwood and Ascott-under-Wychwood. These villages, commonly referred to as The Wychwoods, used to be part of the Royal Forest of Wychwood.

== History ==
- Long barrows and later Bronze age round barrows show the area was settled from at least 3000 BC. 500BC to 40AD - increase in social organisation and construction of earthworks such as Knollbury Camp and Grim's Ditch.
- During Roman times, the region was within a road network with Akeman Street crossing it. Remains of Roman villas have been found at North Leigh and Stonesfield.
- After the decline of Roman control much of the open land reverted to woodland. Later Saxon settlements were restricted to the woodland edge or large clearings.
- In the reign of Ethelred II (978-1016) a royal hunting lodge was established at Woodstock.
- Wychwood was recorded in the Domesday Book of 1086. The king had hunting rights over the whole area designated as Royal Forest, even though much of the land was held by various lords. Only the woodland at Woodstock (later Blenheim), Cornbury and a large area near Kingstanding Farm belonged directly to the king.
- By 1300 Wychwood was divided into 3 portions, centred on the parks of Woodstock, Cornbury and a part which included the Bishop of Winchester's Witney estate.
- In 1704 Woodstock Park was given by the Crown to the Duke of Marlborough. By then Cornbury was in private hands.
- In 1778 the navy procured 500 trees from Wychwood yet by 1792 a report by the Crown Commissioners found only 173 oaks of ship building quality, with fences down, coppices full of deer, cattle and swine, and the locals helping themselves to firewood.
- In 1857 the 10 sq. miles of Wychwood remaining as Royal Forest was taken out of Forest Law by a disafforestation act of Parliament. Ancient forest rights, granted to commoners, were ended and the commoners compensated. Within 2 years 2000 acres of woodland was converted to farmland and housing and 10 miles of new roads were built. Seven new farmsteads were built, including King's Standing Farm. The parish of Leafield and its church dates from this time. The remaining woodland was enclosed in 1867 and still exists.

Wychwood was formerly an extra-parochial area, in 1858 Wychwood became a separate civil parish, on 1 April 1949 the parish was abolished and merged with Cornbury Park to form Cornbury and Wychwood, part also went to Leafield. In 1931 the parish had a population of 253.

== Foresters of Wychwood ==
Arms of de Langley: Gules, two bars or in chief two buck's heads cabossed of the second, hereditary Foresters of Wychwood until 1361

While Wychwood was a designated Royal Forest, royalty entrusted the management of the forest to loyal servants. The men in charge of the forest were called Foresters of Wychwood and, in later years, Keepers of Wychwood. Foresters were tasked with supplying the king with deer, wood, timber and charcoal. They were also charged with upholding the king's law by protecting the forest with the assistance of under-foresters, riding foresters and walking foresters. Foresters, together with verderers (judicial officers) could hold court and try offenders for both minor and major offences. The office of Forester of Wychwood was until 1361 held by the family of de Langley, seated at the manor of Langley in the parish of Shipton-under-Wychwood. They were followed by the Earls of Warwick until 1499. Management was then given by the king to courtiers as favours, for life; among them were Robert Dudley (Earl of Leicester), Sir John Fortescue (Chancellor), Lord Clarendon (Chancellor) and George Spencer, the 4th Duke of Marlborough.

== Modern Wychwood ==
Some of the land that had been cleared for agricultural use was purchased by the Woodland Trust, and re-planted with native English deciduous trees creating Shillbrook Wood, a 9-acre (3.6 ha) site near Bampton, and Eynsham Wood, a 13.37-acre (5.41 ha) site near Eynsham.

Since the late 1990s there has been a resurgence of interest in the history and identity of the Wychwood, exemplified by the founding of the Wychwood Project, now known as The Wychwood Forest Trust. Since 2000, the Wychwood Forest Trust has held an annual Forest Fair at a variety of locations within the old Wychwood boundary. This is a better-behaved revival of the traditional fair that was closed down in 1856 because of rowdy behaviour.

The modern Wychwood Forest Fair is centred on rural skills, heritage crafts, local communities and countryside traditions. It attracts a large number of visitors even in bad weather.

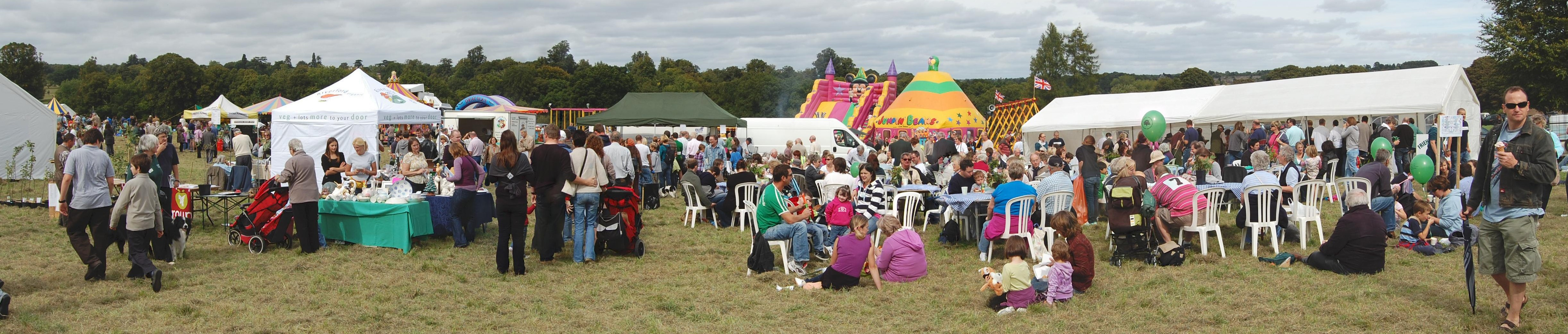
Crowds at a Wychwood Fair

The Oxford University Historical Re-Enactment Society, also known as the Wychwood Warriors, is a reenactment group that recreates aspects of Saxon life in Wychwood during the Dark Ages.

Fragments of the ancient forest survive, one on the Cornbury Estate near Charlbury retaining the name 'Wychwood'.

== Wychwood in art ==
=== Paintings ===
- By Newell Plain, Wychwood Forest, Oxfordshire by William Bowley (1789-1861)
- Duck Shooting in Cornbury Park, Wychwood Forest, Oxfordshire by William Bowley (1789-1861)
- Barking Timber in Wychwood Forest, Oxfordshire by Joshua Cristall (1768-1847)
- Wychwood Forest, Oxfordshire by William Turner (1789-1862). Written in ink on the back of the painting: A scene where a pleasure fair was formerly held in Wychwood Forest, Oxfordshire / William Turner Shipton on Cherwell / Oxon / 1809. Written on the back of the drawing in faded ink.
- In the Forest of Wychwood by Joseph Mallord William Turner (1775-1851)

=== Literature ===
- Wychwood by E. V. Thompson
- Magic at Wychwood by Sally Watson
- Oxfordshire Folk Tales by Kevan Manwaring (Chapter Sixteen: The Highwaymen of Wychwood Forest)
- The Children of Men by P.D. James (Protagonist Theo Faren wants to use Wychwood Forest as a hiding place)
- Wychwood (2017) by George Mann is a novel using a legend of occult practices in this ancient forest as the basis for a modern crime story.
- Parts of The Blanket of the Dark by John Buchan are set in Wychwood.
