= Shipton-under-Wychwood =

Village in Oxfordshire, England

Coordinates: 51.860°N 1.596°W

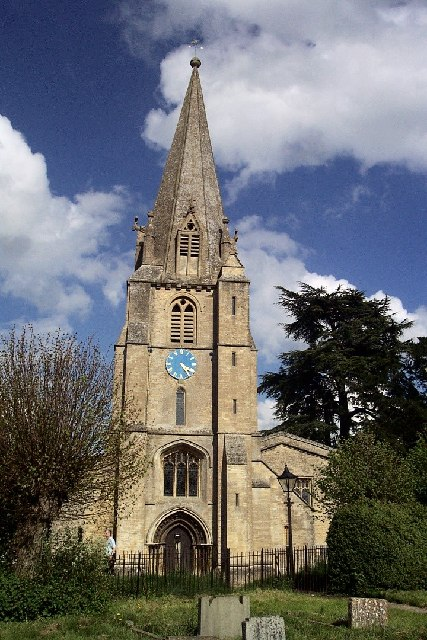
- St. Mary the Virgin parish church

- Location within Oxfordshire
- Population: 1,244 (2011 Census)
- OS grid reference: SP2717
- Civil parish: Shipton-under-Wychwood
- District: West Oxfordshire
- Shire county: Oxfordshire
- Region: South East
- Country: England
- Sovereign state: United Kingdom
- Post town: Chipping Norton
- Postcode district: OX7
- Dialling code: 01993
- Police: Thames Valley
- Fire: Oxfordshire
- Ambulance: South Central
- UK Parliament: Witney
- Website: Shipton-u-Wychwood

Shipton-under-Wychwood is a village and civil parish in the Evenlode valley about 4 miles (6.4 km) north of Burford, in the West Oxfordshire district, in the county of Oxfordshire, England. The village is one of three named after the ancient forest of Wychwood. The others are Milton-under-Wychwood immediately to the west of the village and Ascott-under-Wychwood about 1.5 miles (2.4 km) to the east. The 2011 Census recorded Shipton-under-Wychwood's parish population as 1,244.

== Manors ==
=== Langley ===
About 2 miles (3 km) southeast of the village is the farmhouse of Langley, a largely mid-19th-century building. It is on the site of a royal hunting lodge that was built for Henry VII. Most of the Tudor monarchs stayed there when hunting in Wychwood Forest. King James I stayed at Langley in August 1605, and a French servant who died was buried at Shipton. The de Langley family were hereditary keepers of Wychwood Forest, Oxon. The office carried with it the tenancy of the manor of Langley in Shipton-under-Wychwood parish. The heir was Simon Verney (d. 1368) whose brother was William Verney of Byfield, Northants., father of Alice Verney, 1st. wife of John Danvers (d. 1449) of Calthorpe, MP for Oxfordshire 1420, 1421, 1423 and 1435. The de Langley family held the manor of Shipton, Oxfordshire, and Richard Lee in his Gleanings of Oxfordshire of 1574 states that these arms of "Gules, 2 bars or in chief 2 buck's heads cabossed of the 2nd" were then displayed in a stained glass window in St. Mary's parish church at Shipton with a tomb under it. The buck's heads seem to be a reference to the de Langley office of forester of Wychwood.

Arms of de Langley: Gules, two bars or in chief two buck's heads cabossed of the second

=== Lacey ===
Shipton Court, the estate of the Lacey family, was built in about 1603 but sold to Sir Compton Reade in 1663. It passed down in the Reade family until 1868 when, on the death of Sir John Reade, it was left to his footman Joseph Wakefield, on condition that he took the name Reade.

== Parish church ==
The Church of England parish church of St. Mary has a tower built in about 1200–1250, a 15th-century stone pulpit and font and a Tudor wall monument. The architect Richard Pace designed Saint Mary's Rectory, which was built in 1818.

== Sports teams ==
Shipton-under-Wychwood Cricket Club

Founded in 1920, Shipton-under-Wychwood Cricket Club First XI plays in The Home Counties Premier League, and the Second, Third and Fourth XI play in The Oxford Times Cherwell League. The men's first 11 won The National Village Knockout, with the final played at Lord's, in 2002 and 2003. Oscar-winning film director Sam Mendes played in the team that lost in the final of the Knockout in 1997 The First XI won the National Village Knockout at Lords in 2002 and 2003, and was runner-up in 1997 and 2010. It was also Oxfordshire Team of the Year in 2011 after its trip to Lords, winning the Cherwell League title, and winning both the premier Oxfordshire Twenty 20 Competitions, all within 12 months. The club launched its first Ladies team in 2014, after several successful seasons running girls' sides. The Women's first 11 won the Oxfordshire Ladies Championship in 2015.

== Economic and social history ==
William Langland, the conjectured author of Piers Plowman, is known to have been a tenant in Shipton-under-Wychwood where he died. The village has three historic public houses: the Shaven Crown Hotel, The Wychwood and the Lamb Inn. The Shaven Crown Hotel overlooking the village green was once a guest house run by the monks of Bruern Abbey. The present building is mainly 15th century. The former leader of the British Union of Fascists, Sir Oswald Mosley stayed at the hotel after his release from internment in 1943. The Lamb Inn is 16th century and is controlled by Greene King Brewery.

== Amenities ==
Shipton railway station is on the Cotswold Line. Shipton-under-Wychwood is on the Oxfordshire Way footpath, which can be used to walk north-westwards up the Evenlode Valley to Bruern Abbey and Bledington, or eastwards down the valley to Charlbury.

== Sources ==
- Colvin, H.M. (1997). A Biographical Dictionary of British Architects, 1600-1840. New Haven: Yale University Press. p. 764. ISBN 0-300-07207-4.
- Godden, Malcolm (1990). The Making of Piers Plowman. London: Longman. ISBN 0-582-01685-1.
- Macnamara, Francis Nottidge (1895). Memorials of the Danvers Family. London: Hardy and Page. p. 198.
- Roskell, J.S.; Clarke, Linda; Rawcliffe, Carole, eds. (1992). "Danvers, John". House of Commons 1386–1421. History of Parliament. Vol. 2. Stroud: Alan Sutton Publishing. pp. 747–748.
- Sherwood, Jennifer; Pevsner, Nikolaus (1974). Oxfordshire. The Buildings of England. Harmondsworth: Penguin Books. pp. 758–760. ISBN 0-14-071045-0.
