= St Matthew's Church, Langford =

- Parish Church of St Matthew, Langford
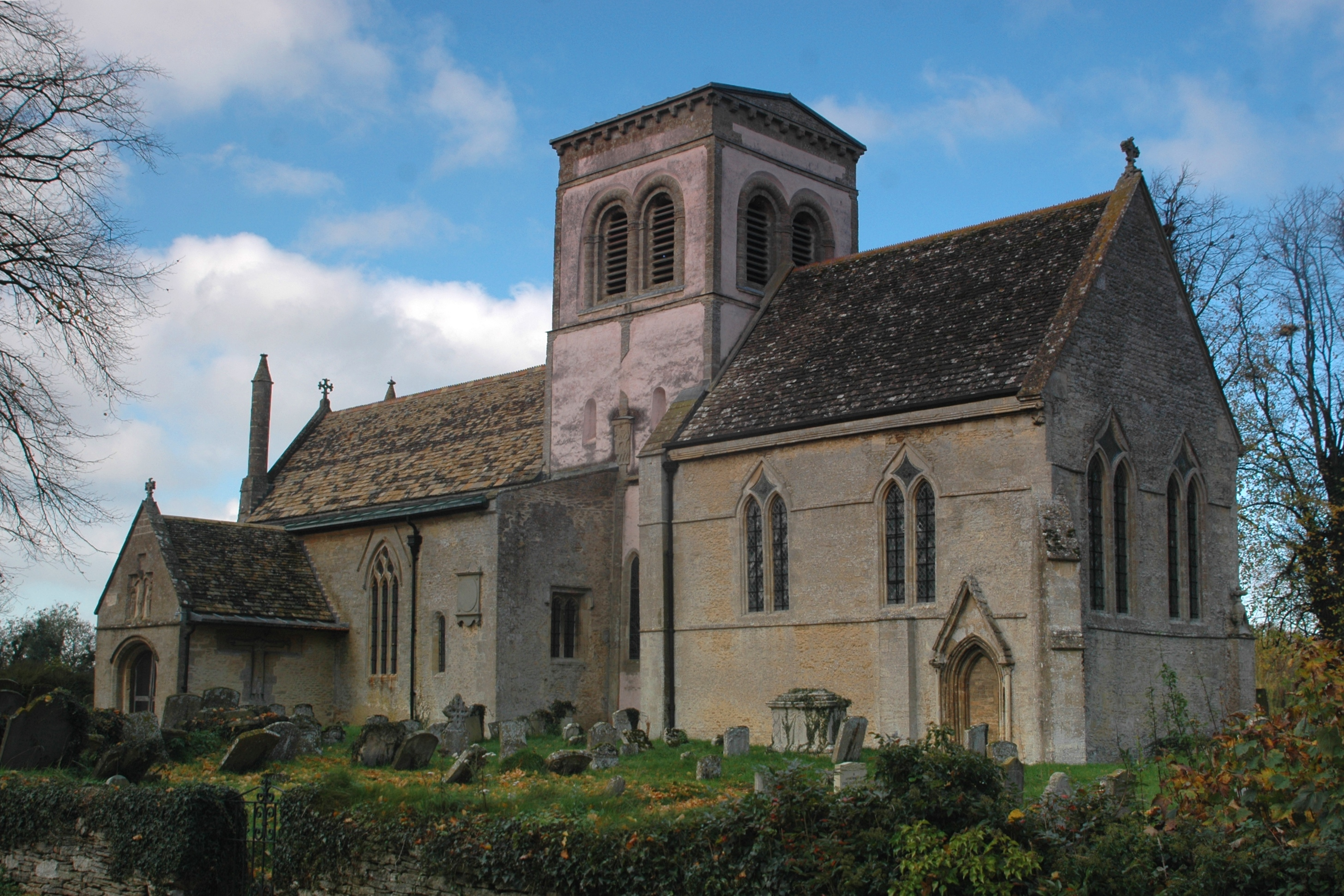
- St Matthew's Church, Langford
- 51°43′33.6″N 1°38′34.8″W
- OS grid reference: SP 24911 02530
- Location: Langford, Oxfordshire GL7 3LG
- Country: England
- Denomination: Church of England

History
- Dedication: Saint Matthew
- Earlier dedication: Saint Mary

Architecture
- Style: Anglo-Saxon, Gothic

Administration
- Province: Canterbury
- Diocese: Oxford
- Archdeaconry: Oxford
- Deanery: Witney
- Parish: Langford St Matthew, including Grafton and Radcot, Langford

Clergy
- Vicar: Harry Campbell MacInnes

Listed Building – Grade I
- Official name: Church of St Matthew
- Designated: 12 September 1955
- Reference no.: 1053385

The Parish Church of Saint Matthew, Langford is the Church of England parish church of Langford, a village in West Oxfordshire about 3 miles (5 km) northeast of Lechlade in neighbouring Gloucestershire. It is an important example of Anglo-Saxon architecture, with two Anglo-Saxon carved roods.

== Government ==
The church was established as a chapelry of the Anglo-Saxon minster of St Mary's, Bampton. Later in the Anglo-Saxon era Langford was elevated to a minster with its own dependent chapels at Grafton and Radcot. Both chapels are long gone, but Grafton and Radcot hamlets remain parts of Langford's ecclesiastical parish.

Langford was part of the Diocese of Lincoln until the Diocese of Oxford was established under Henry VIII in 1541. Despite becoming part of the new diocese, Langford remained a prebend of Lincoln Cathedral until 1848, when the Ecclesiastical Commissioners Act 1840 ceded all prebendal estates in England to the Ecclesiastical Commissioners.

The church at Langford was formerly dedicated to St. Mary. It was later rededicated to its current patron, St. Matthew.

The parish is now part of the Benefice of Shill Valley and Broadshire, which includes also the parishes of Alvescot, Black Bourton, Broadwell, Broughton Poggs, Filkins, Holwell, Kelmscott, Kencot, Little Faringdon, Shilton and Westwell.

== Anglo-Saxon building ==
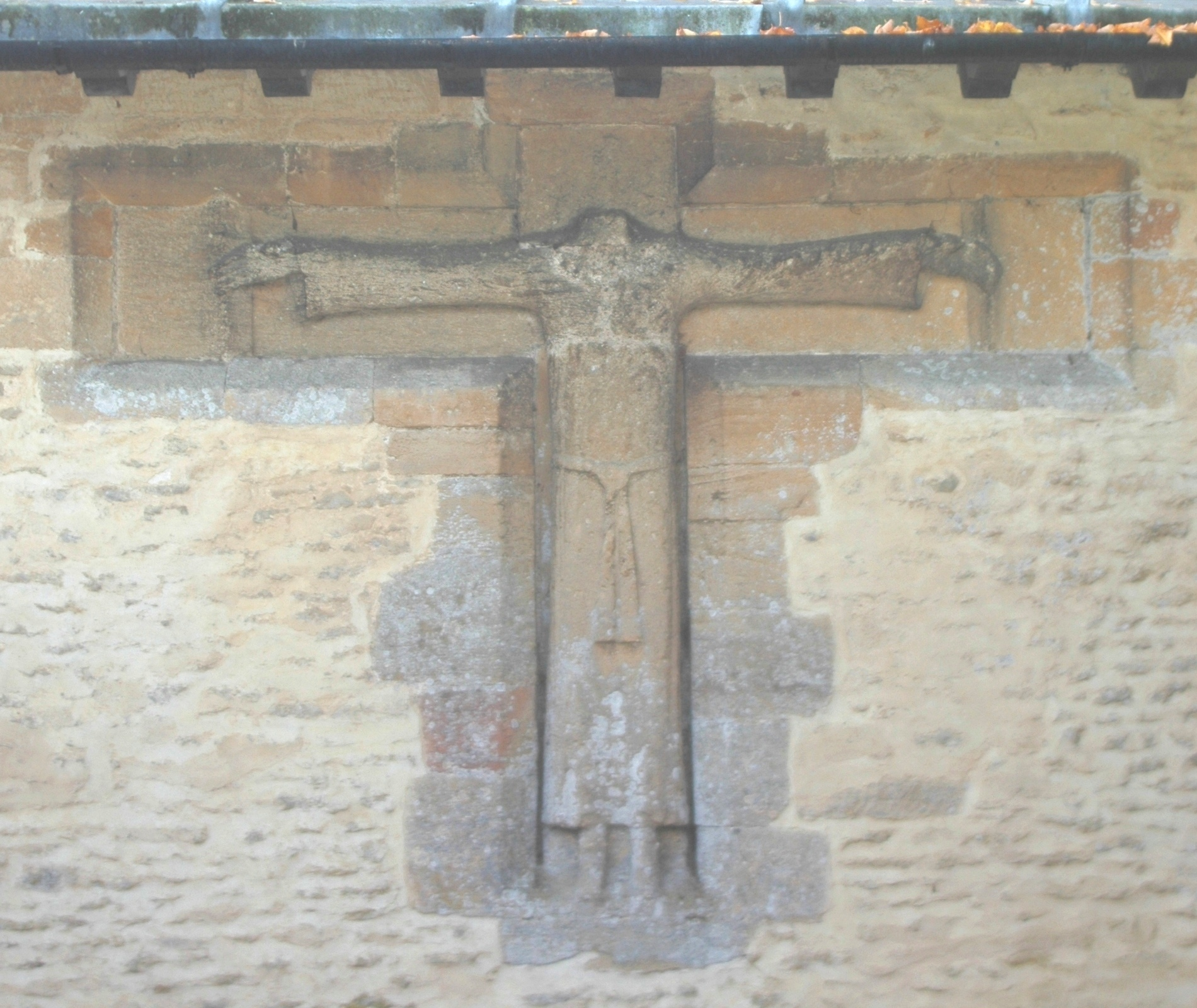
Headless rood of Christ, possibly 8th century, on east wall of south porch

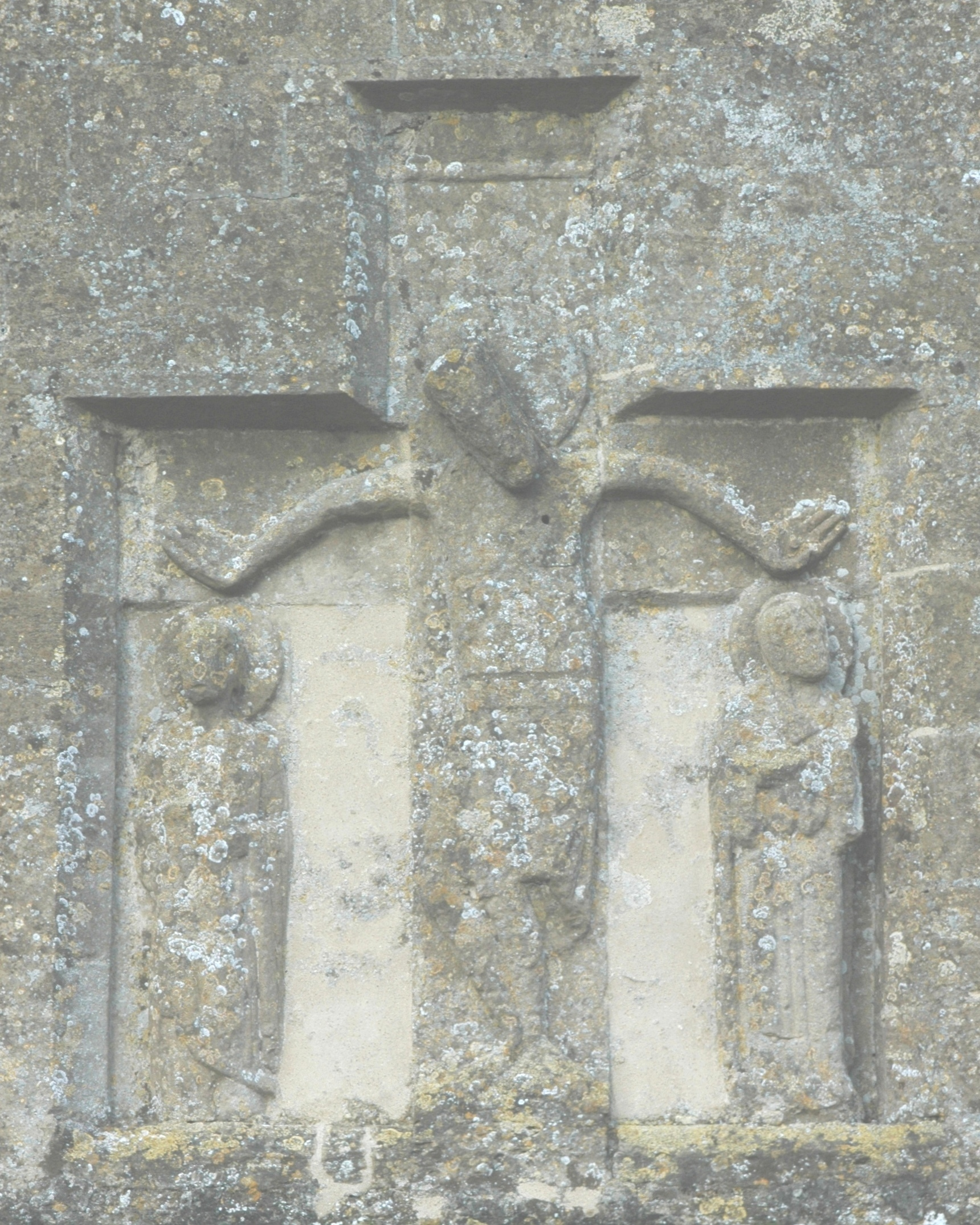
10th-century rood of Christ, St. Mary and St. John on south gable of south porch

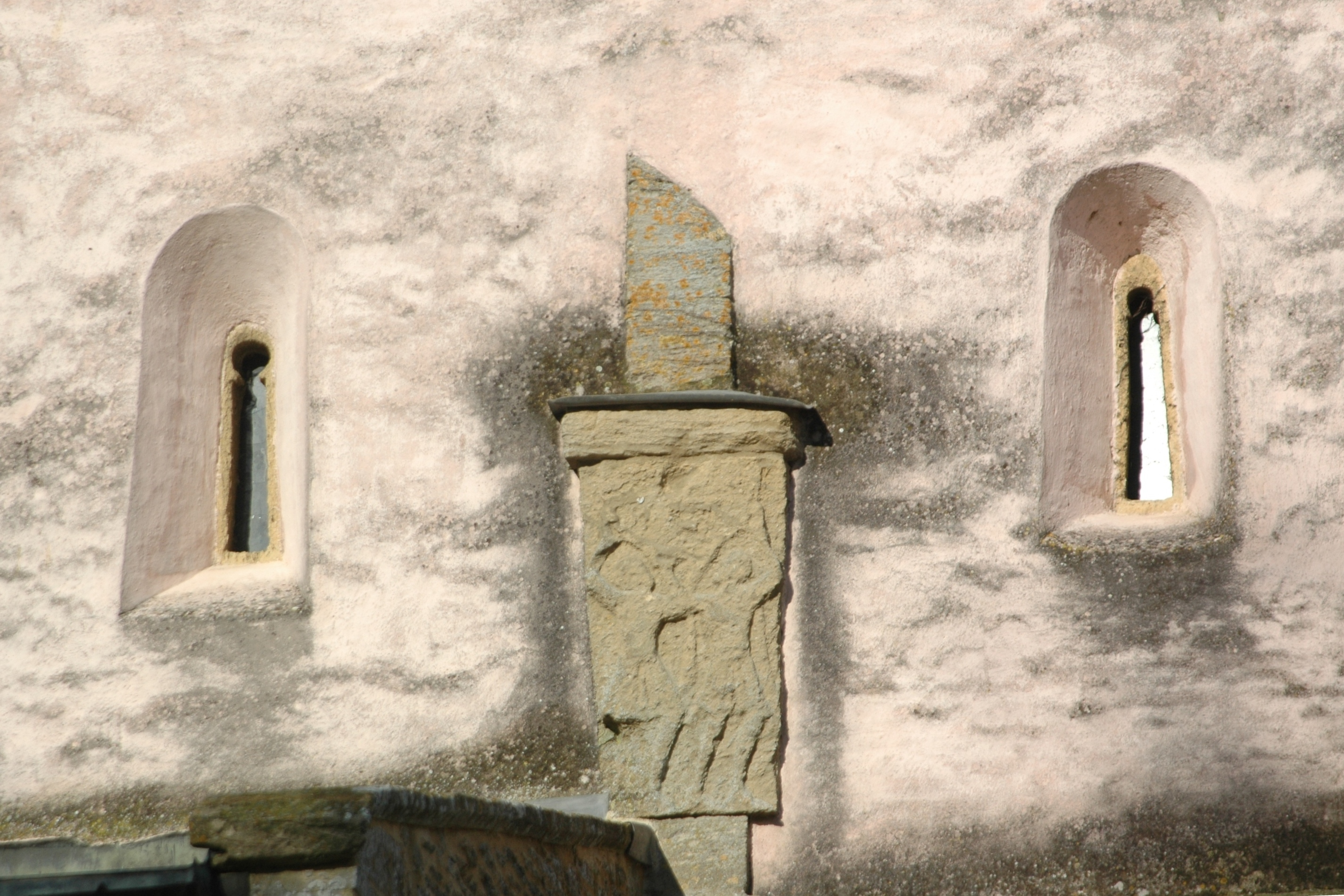
11th-century double-splayed windows and relief on the south wall of the tower

The oldest parts of the present church at Langford are the bell tower and nave, which were built in the second half of the 11th century. They may post-date the Norman Conquest of England, but they are very high-quality work by Anglo-Saxon masons and are the most important Anglo-Saxon remains in Oxfordshire.

The later porch includes two Anglo-Saxon stone rood reliefs, but they are repositioned and their original sites are not known. The larger one on the east wall of the porch is 8th century and has lost its head. That on the south gable of the porch is 10th century and has been assembled with Christ's left and right arms swapped over and the figures of Saint Mary and Saint John the Evangelist also transposed.

== Later alterations ==
The nave aisles were added in about 1200 and the south porch in the 13th century, all in the Early English Gothic style. The west walls of the nave and two aisles each have a 13th-century lancet window. The porch formerly had two storeys. The upper storey has since been removed, but its blocked doorway and the outline of its stairs are still visible inside the south aisle.

In the 13th century the chancel was rebuilt wider and taller. The line of the former 11th-century roof survives against the east wall of the tower. The concave lozenge at the top of each chancel window is a highly unusual feature. The elaborate aumbry in the north wall of the chancel, with six compartments under three gables, is also unusual and suggests that it was a rich parish at the time.

Most of the windows of the nave are 14th or 15th century Decorated or Perpendicular insertions. The font is also 15th century.

In 1574 two flying buttresses were added to the north side of the north aisle. The more westerly of the two bears an inscription giving the date in the reign of Elizabeth I. A pair of tall, cylindrical pinnacles at the west end of the nave, surmounting the late Norman pilaster buttresses on the west gable wall, were also added in the 16th century.

The pulpit was made in 1673, though it still appears Jacobean in style. A clock was installed in the later 17th century but is now a static exhibit in the south aisle.

== Restoration and conservation ==
The architect and builder Richard Pace restored the building in 1829. Further repairs were recommended by the Ecclesiastical Commissioners' surveyor Benjamin Ferrey in 1848 and undertaken the following year. The Gothic Revival architect Ewan Christian restored the nave roof to its original pitch in 1864.

St. Matthew's is now a Grade I listed building.

== Bells ==
The tower has a ring of six bells. Four were cast in 1741 by Henry III Bagley of Chacombe, Northamptonshire, who at the time had a bell-foundry at Witney. The tenor and treble bells were cast by the Whitechapel Bell Foundry in 1953.

== Gallery ==
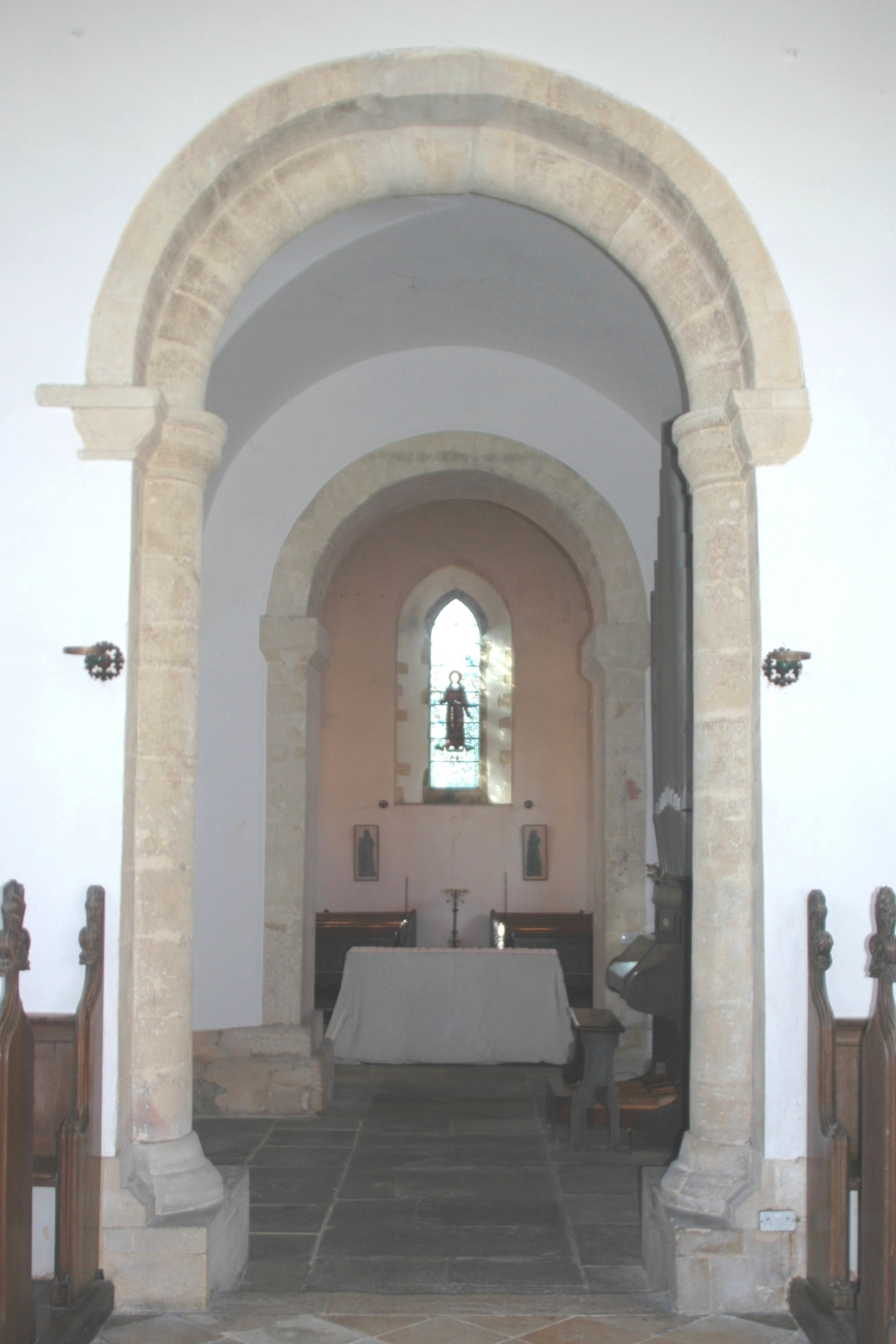
11th-century tower arches and 12th- or 13th-century west window

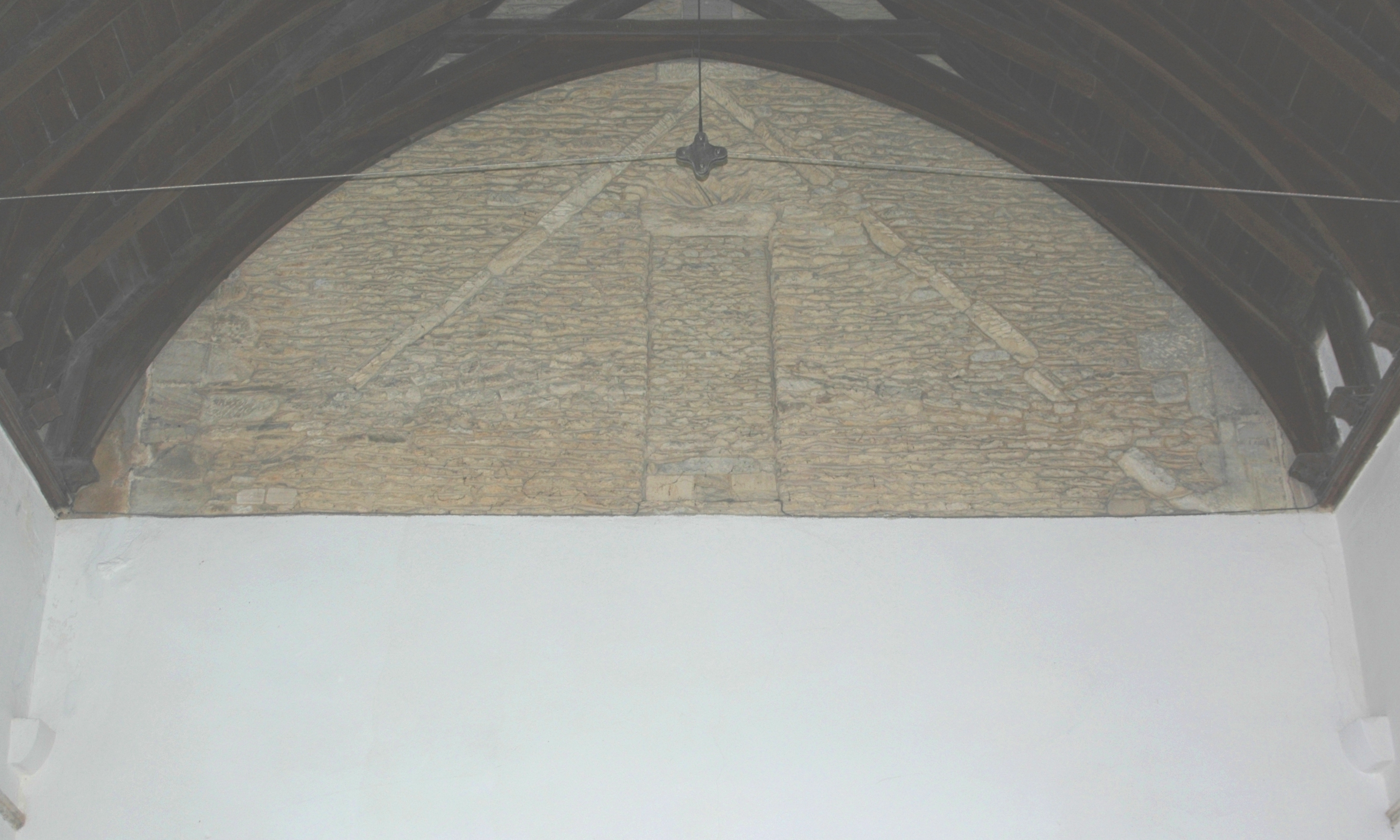
East wall oftower showing the line of the former 11th-century roof inside the 13th-century chancel

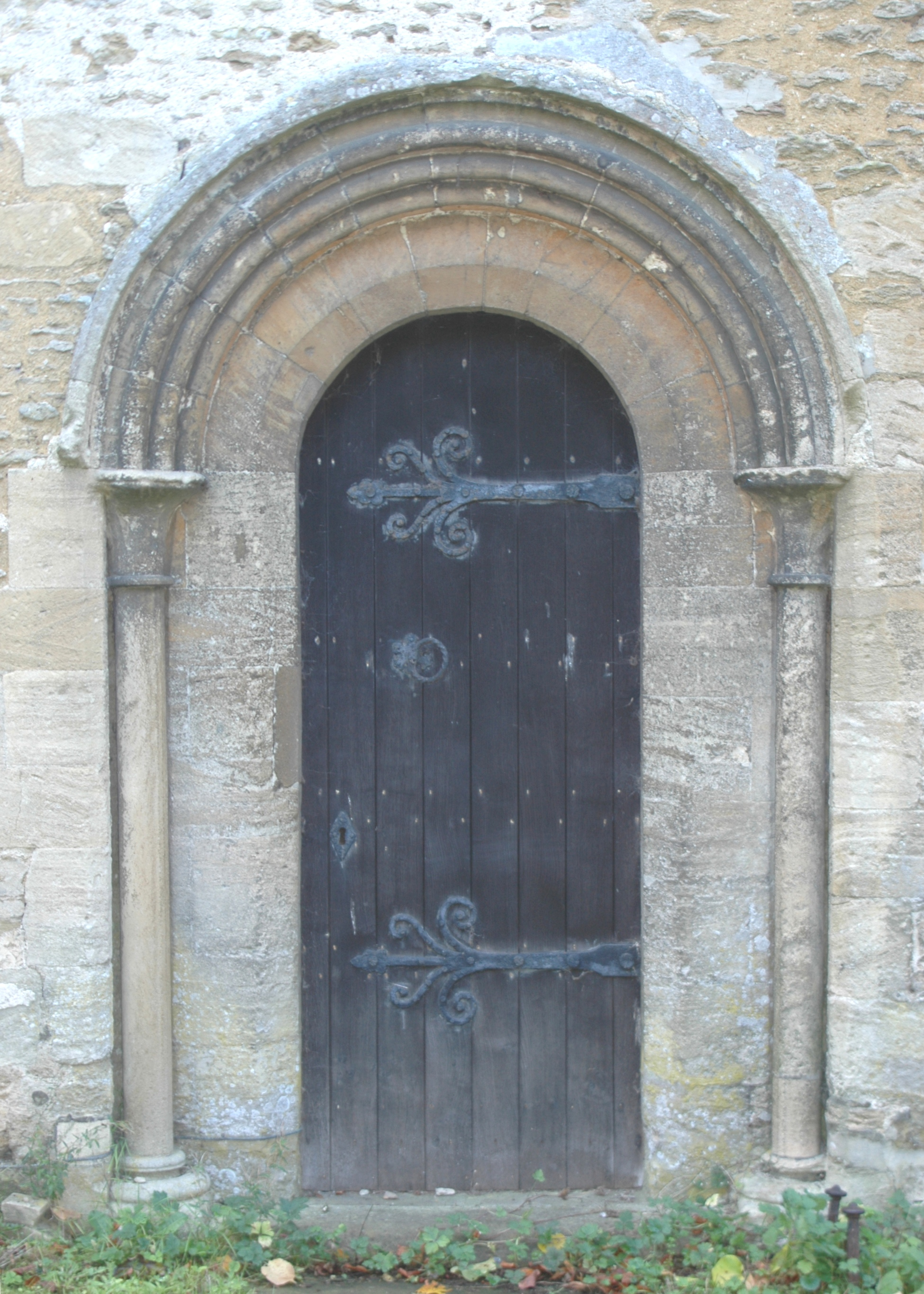
Norman north doorway of nave, circa 1200

Stiff-leaf nave capital

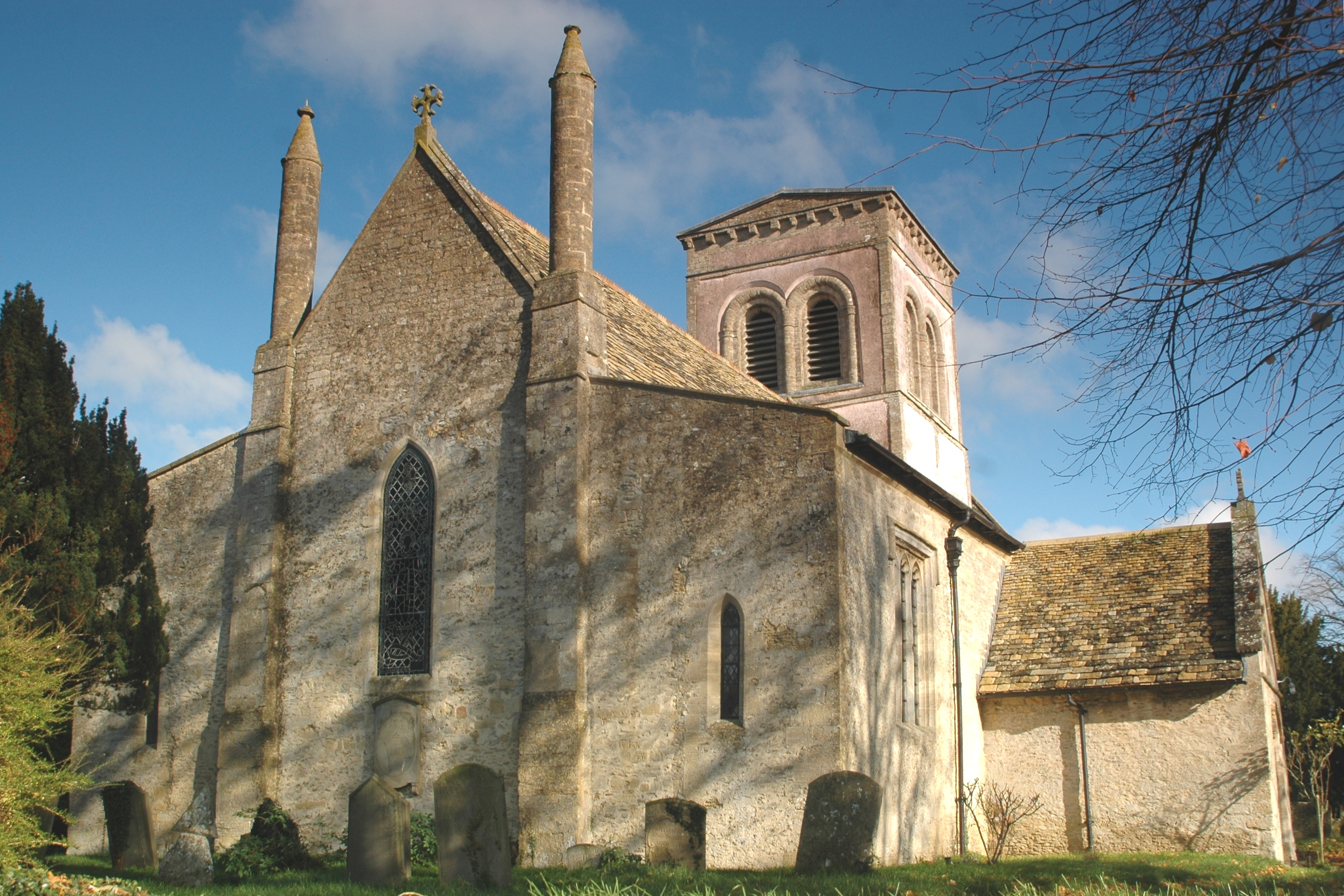
West view of church showing Early English lancet windows and 16th-century pinnacles

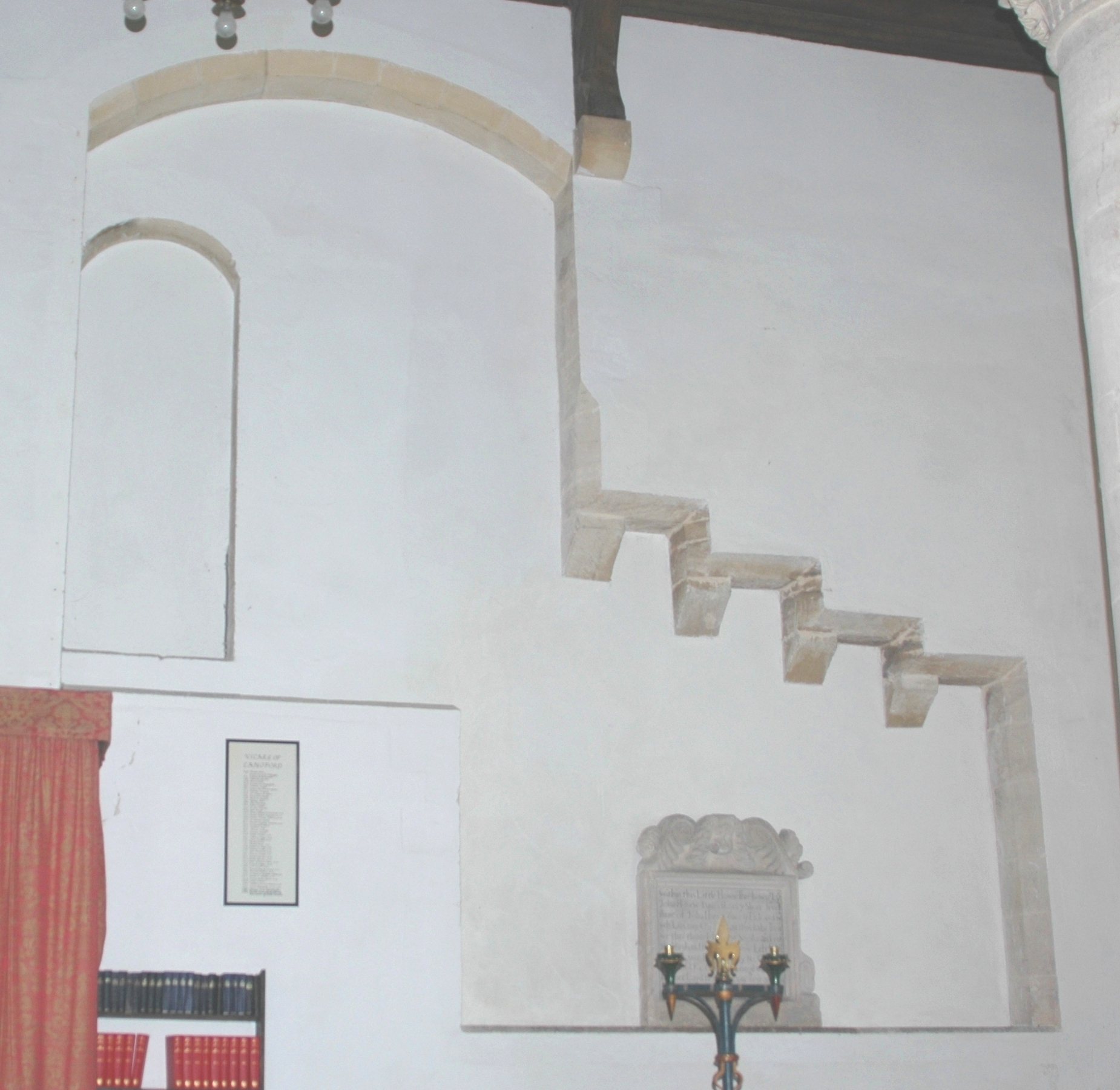
Blocked doorway and outline of former stair to former upper room of porch, probably 13th century

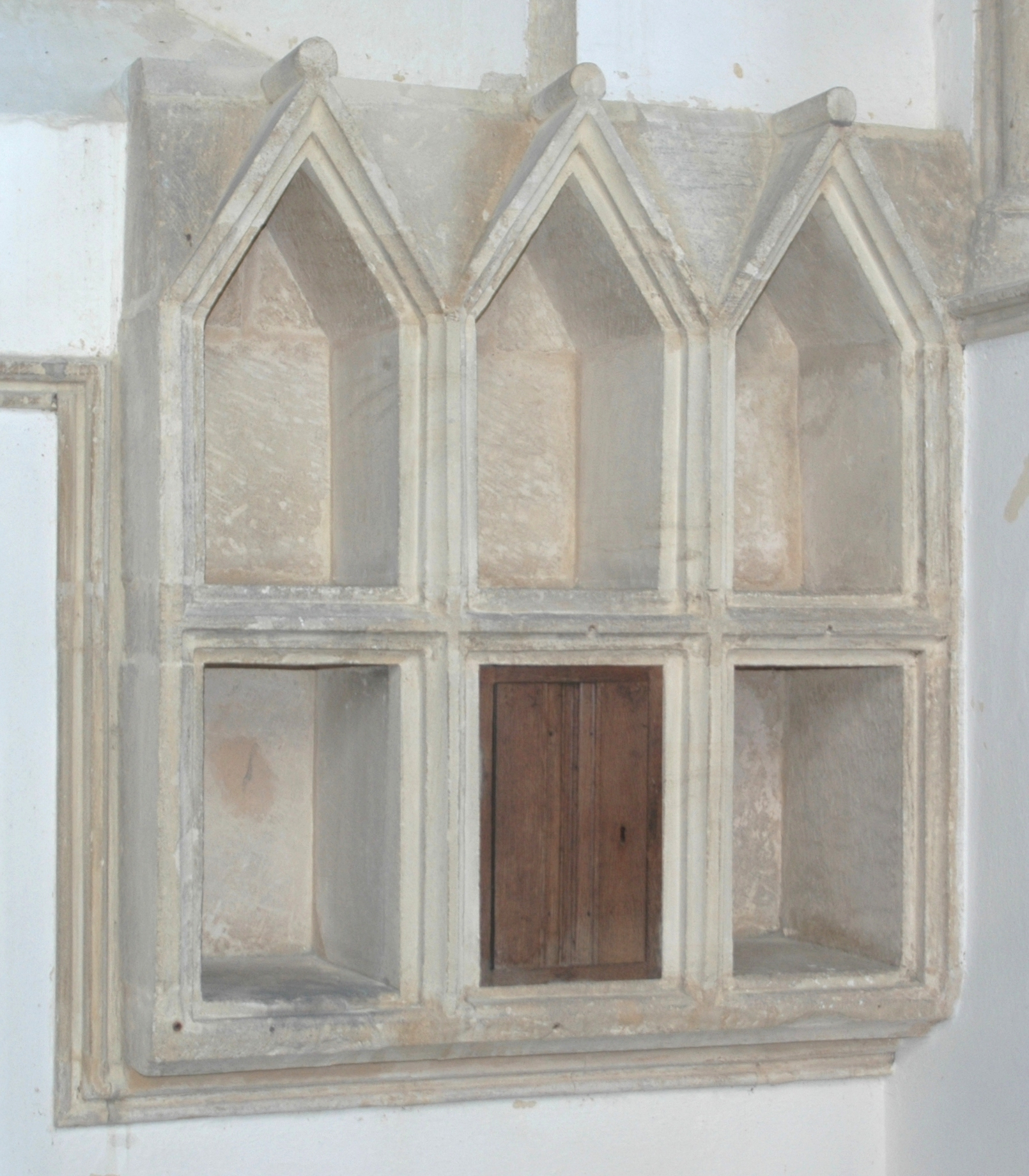
13th-century aumbry in the chancel

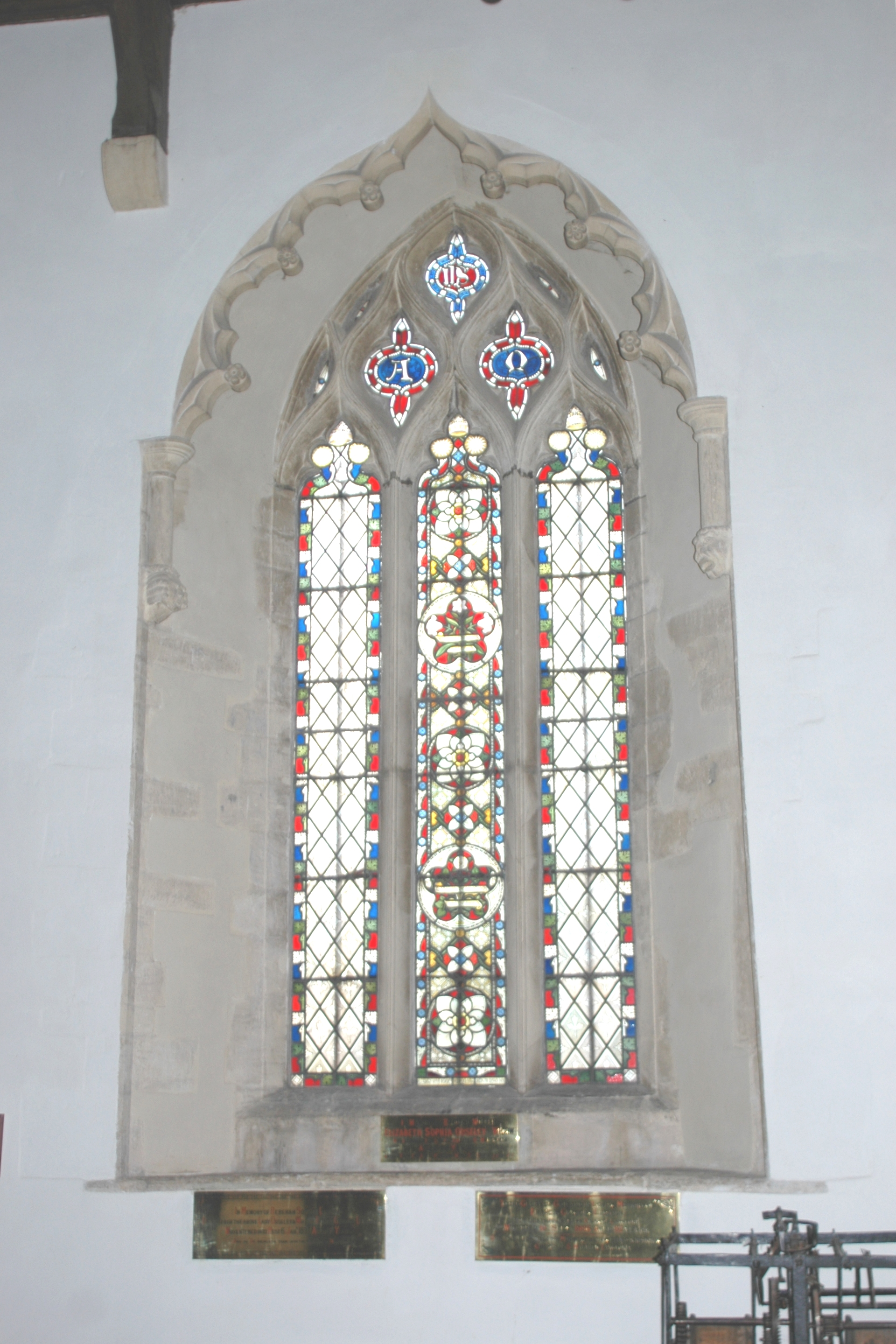
14th-century window in south aisle of nave with three lights, ogee tracery and cusped rere-arch

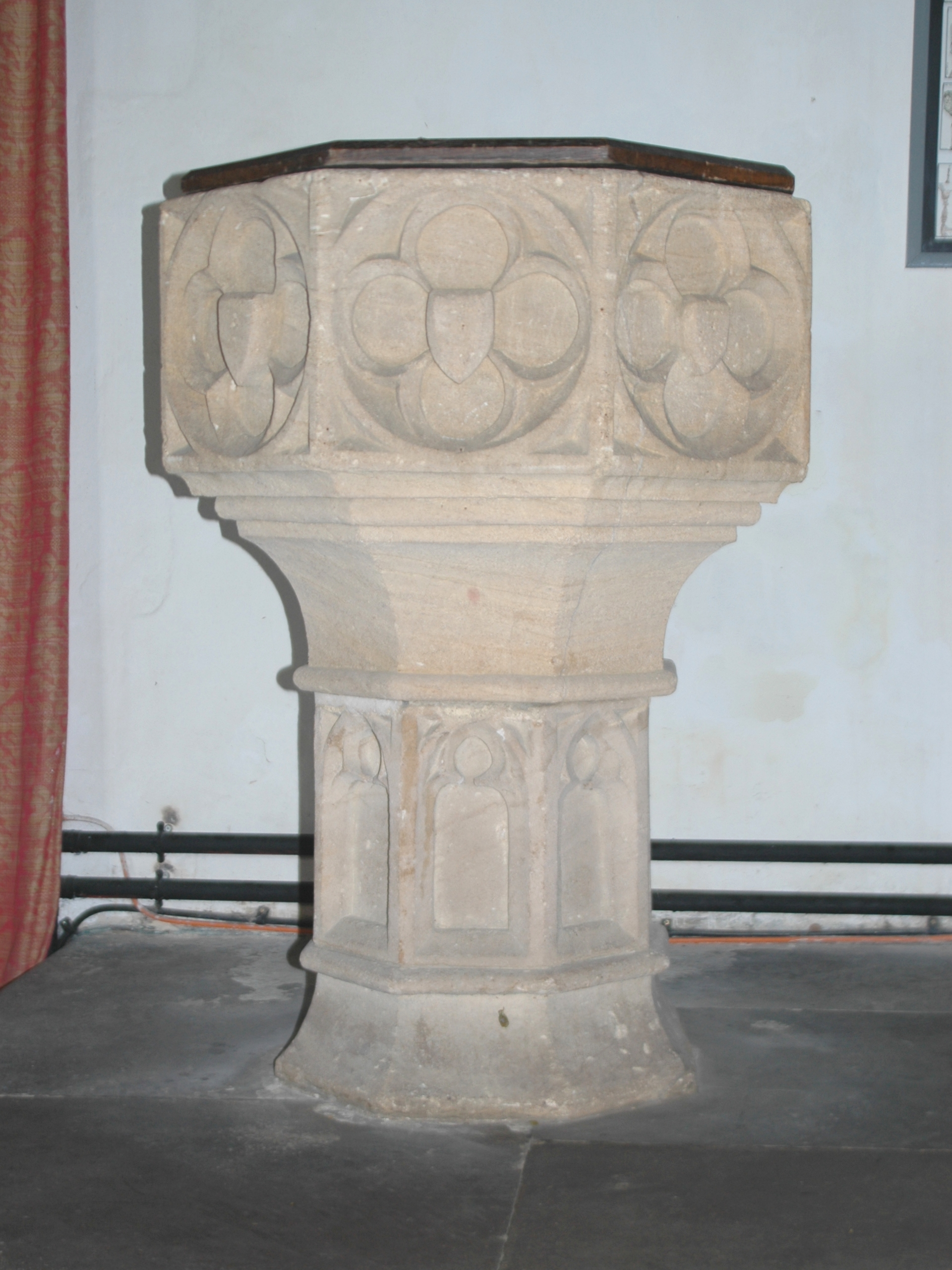
15th-century font

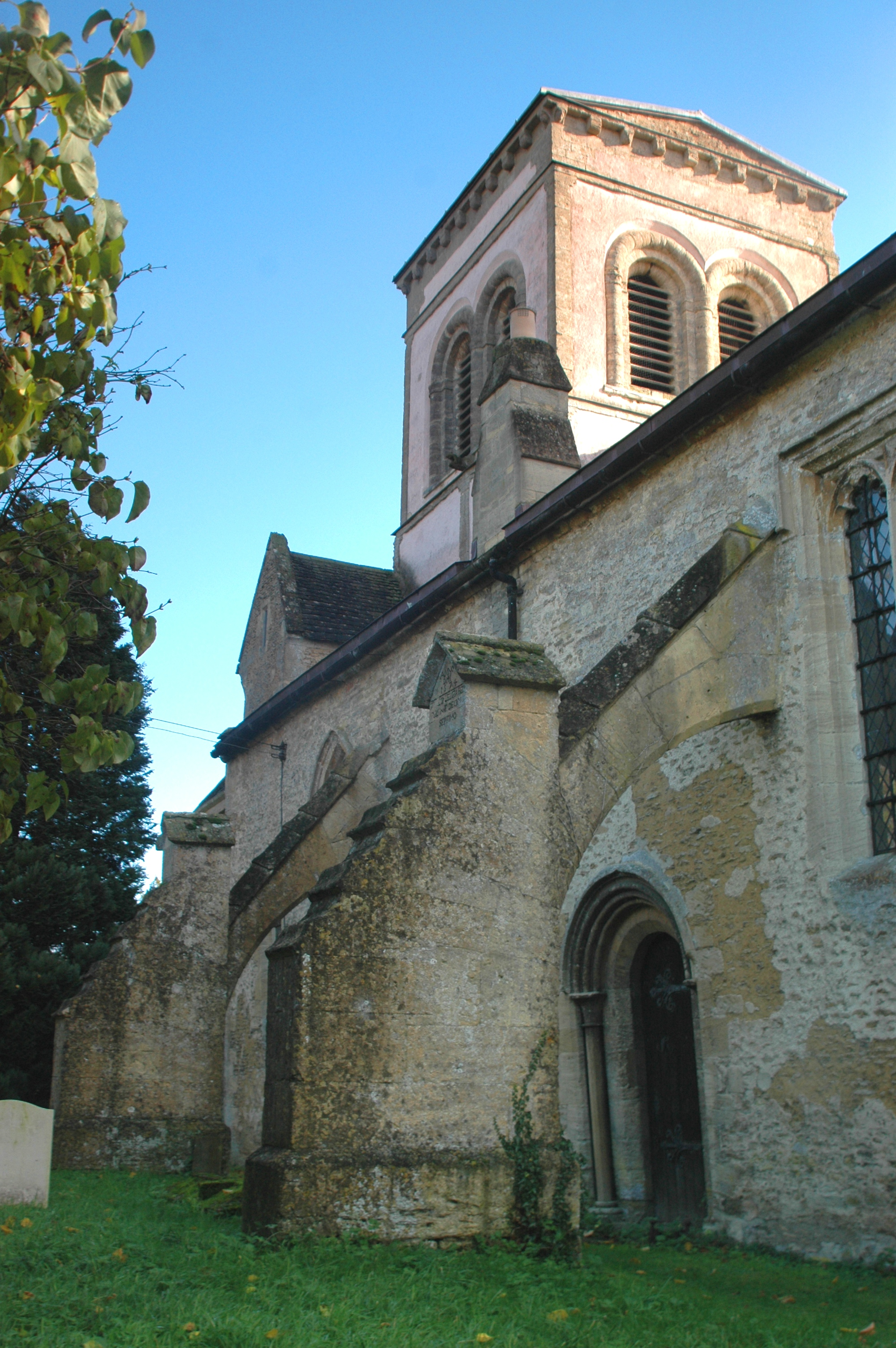
Elizabethan flying buttresses supporting the north wall of the north aisle

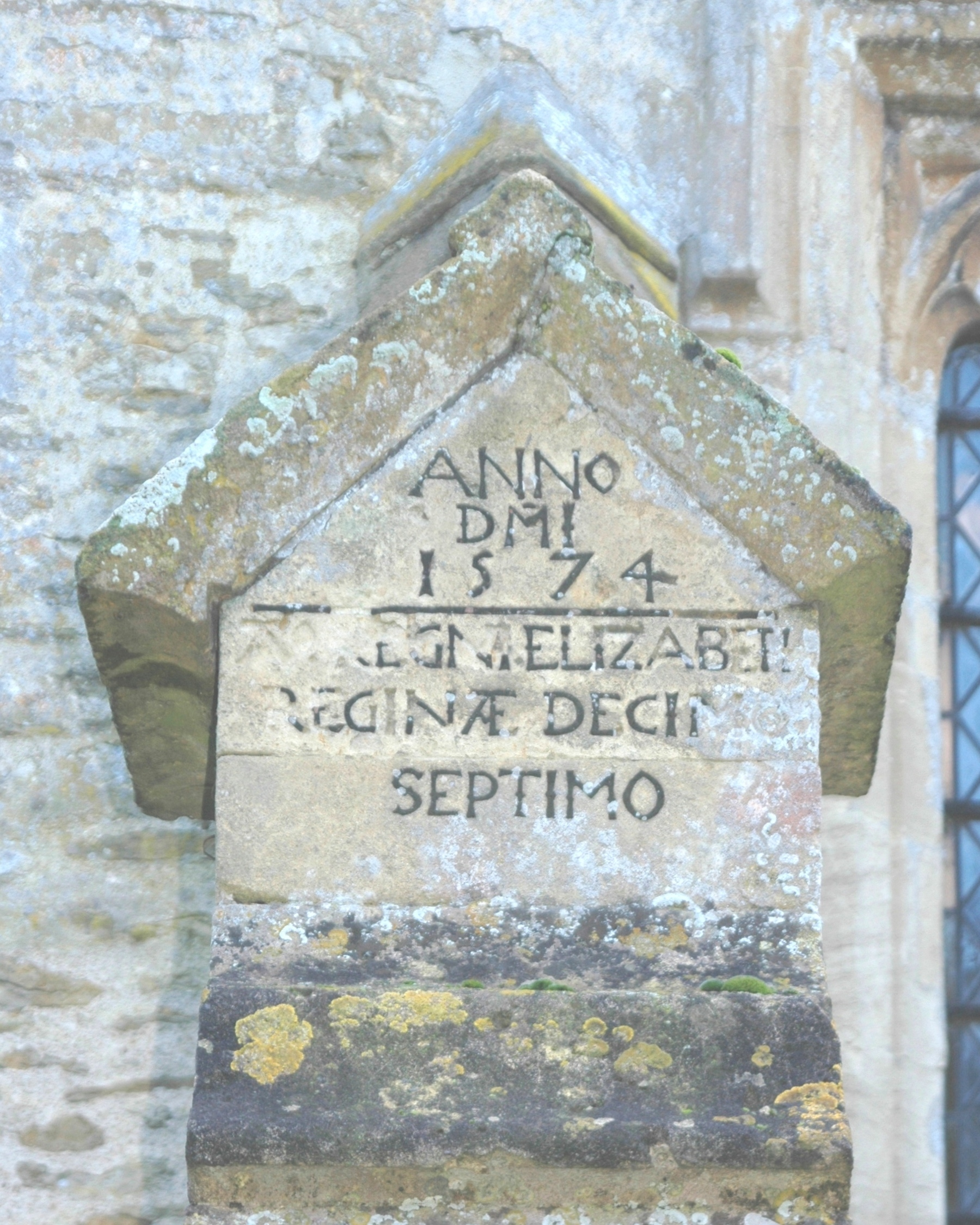
Inscription dating the buttresses to 1574

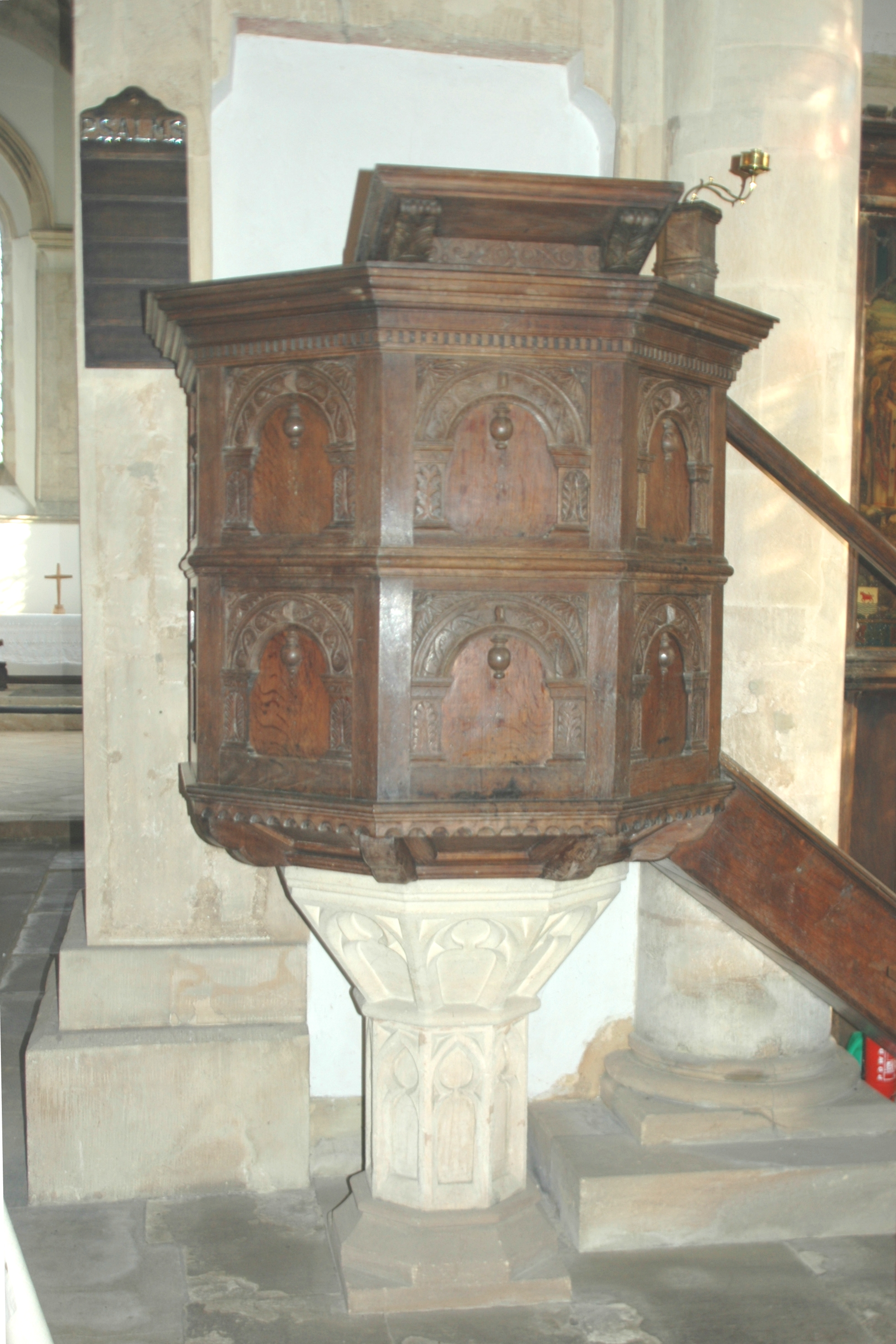
17th-century pulpit

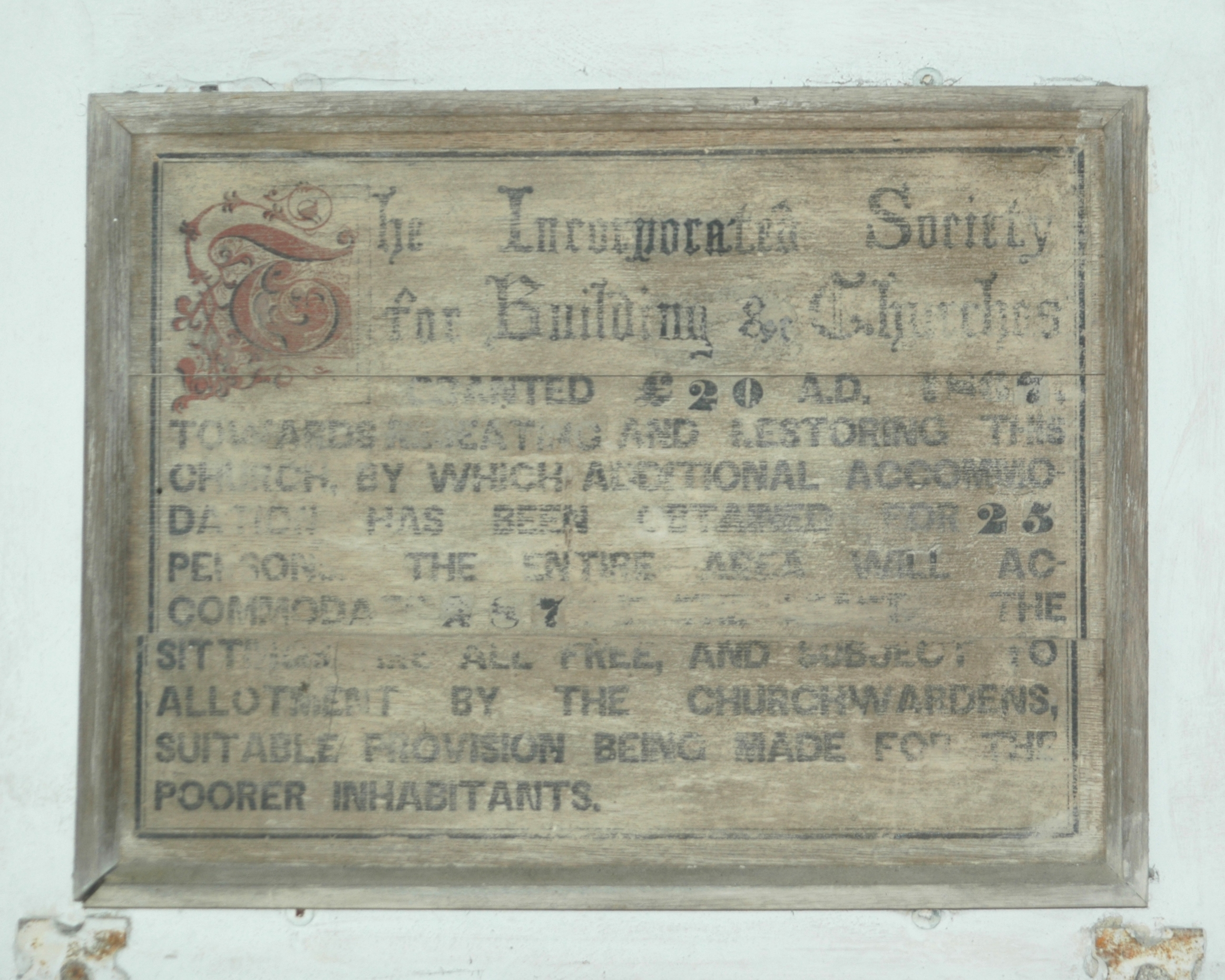
Wooden plaque recording a grant from the Incorporated Society for Building and Churches, dated 1867

== Sources ==
- Beeson, C.F.C. (1989) [1962]. Simcock, A.V. (ed.). Clockmaking in Oxfordshire 1400–1850 (3rd ed.). Oxford: Museum of the History of Science. p. 45. ISBN 0-903364-06-9.
- Cotterill, Derek (2008). St Matthew's Langford. Langford, Oxfordshire: Parish of St. Matthew, Langford.
- Sherwood, Jennifer; Pevsner, Nikolaus (1974). Oxfordshire. The Buildings of England. Harmondsworth: Penguin Books. pp. 678–681. ISBN 0-14-071045-0.
