= Holwell, Oxfordshire =

Village in Oxfordshire, England

Coordinates: 51.780°N 1.665°W

Holwell
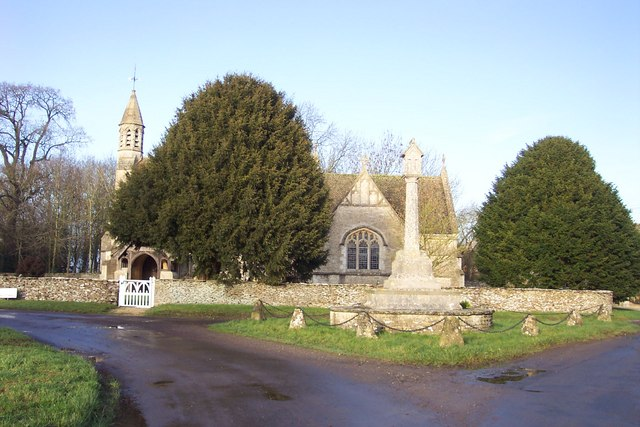
- Holwell war memorial and St Mary's parish church, seen from the south (December 2006)

- Location within Oxfordshire
- Population: 17 (2001 Census)
- OS grid reference: SP2309
- Civil parish: Holwell
- District: West Oxfordshire
- Shire county: Oxfordshire
- Region: South East
- Country: England
- Sovereign state: United Kingdom
- Post town: Burford
- Postcode district: OX18
- Dialling code: 01993
- Police: Thames Valley
- Fire: Oxfordshire
- Ambulance: South Central
- UK Parliament: Witney

Holwell is a village and civil parish about 2 miles (3 km) south of Burford in West Oxfordshire. The 2001 Census recorded the parish's population as 17.

== History ==
During the time that Robert de Chesney was Bishop of Lincoln (1148–66), land at Holwell was given to the Cistercian Abbey at Bruern. The Church of England parish church of Saint Mary was built in the 13th century. It was rebuilt in 1842 and again in 1895. The latter rebuilding was designed by the architect Walter Mills of Banbury, using a Gothic Revival interpretation of Perpendicular Gothic. St Mary's parish is now part of the Benefice of Shill Valley and Broadshire, which includes also the parishes of Alvescot, Black Bourton, Broadwell, Broughton Poggs, Filkins, Kelmscott, Kencot, Langford, Little Faringdon, Shilton and Westwell.

== Attractions ==
The Cotswold Wildlife Park is within the ecclesiastical parish of Holwell, and the bordering civil parish of Broadwell.

== Sources and further reading ==
- Fisher, A.S.T. (1968). The History of Broadwell, Oxfordshire, with Filkins, Kelmscott and Holwell. privately published.
- Page, William, ed. (1907). A History of the County of Oxford, Volume 2. Victoria County History. Archibald Constable & Co. pp. 79–80.
- Sherwood, Jennifer; Pevsner, Nikolaus (1974). Oxfordshire. The Buildings of England. Harmondsworth: Penguin Books. p. 650. ISBN 0-14-071045-0.
