= Westwell, Oxfordshire =

Village in Oxfordshire, England

Coordinates: 51.788°N 1.677°W

Westwell
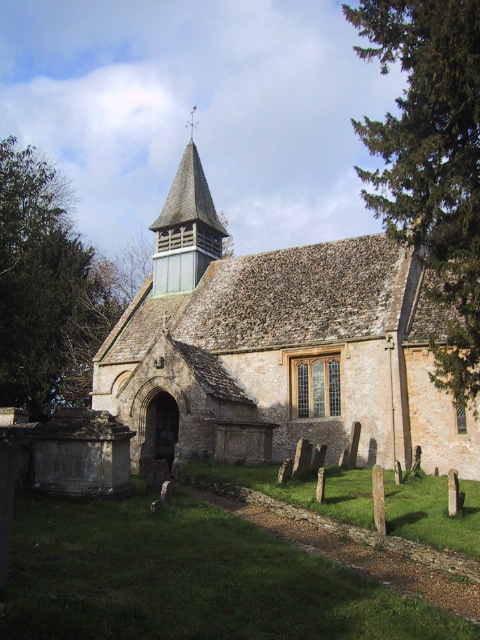
- St Mary's parish church

- Location within Oxfordshire
- Population: 67 (2001 census)
- OS grid reference: SP2209
- Civil parish: Westwell
- District: West Oxfordshire
- Shire county: Oxfordshire
- Region: South East
- Country: England
- Sovereign state: United Kingdom
- Post town: Burford
- Postcode district: OX18
- Dialling code: 01993
- Police: Thames Valley
- Fire: Oxfordshire
- Ambulance: South Central
- UK Parliament: Witney

Westwell is a small village and civil parish about 2 miles (3 km) southwest of the market town of Burford in Oxfordshire. It is the westernmost village in the county, close to the border with Gloucestershire.

== Manor ==
The oldest part of the Manor House was built in about 1545. The east wing of the house was added in about 1750 and the north and south wings in about 1840. The house was altered and restored in 1920. Close to the Manor House is a dovecote that was built in the 17th century. It is still in use as a dovecote. Adjoining the Manor House to the northeast is a barn that was probably built in the 18th century, but has a Tudor arched entrance with a mullioned window above. The Manor House, dovecote and barn are all Grade II* listed buildings.

== Parish church ==
The Church of England parish church of Saint Mary is Norman and was built in the 12th century. The chancel arch may have originally been Norman, but if so it was later altered in the Transitional style from Norman to Early English Gothic. The chancel's east window may also be Transitional, but the windows in its north and south walls are Early English lancets. The south porch was added in the 14th century and to the east of it one of the nave windows is Perpendicular Gothic. The other windows of the nave are Victorian. In 1869 the nave was extended one bay to the west and the bell-turret was added.

St Mary's is a Grade I listed building. The parish is now part of the Benefice of Shill Valley and Broadshire, which includes also the parishes of Alvescot, Black Bourton, Broadwell, Broughton Poggs, Filkins, Holwell, Kelmscott, Kencot, Langford, Little Faringdon and Shilton. The Rectory (now the Old Rectory) was built at or before the end of the 17th century. It is a five-bayed building of ashlar Cotswold stone. It is a Grade II* listed building.

== War memorial ==
The Westwell war memorial was erected after the First World War. It incorporates a numeral from a face of the clock of the Cloth Hall, Ypres. The Oxfordshire and Buckinghamshire Light Infantry had fought in the First Battle of Ypres in 1914 and the Battle of Passchendaele near Ypres in 1917.

== Sources and further reading ==
- Fisher, A.S.T. (1972). History of Westwell, Oxfordshire. Bear Court Books. ISBN 0950169013.
- Sherwood, Jennifer; Pevsner, Nikolaus (1974). Oxfordshire. The Buildings of England. Harmondsworth: Penguin Books. pp. 834–836. ISBN 0-14-071045-0.
