= Kelmscott =

Village in Oxfordshire, England

Coordinates: 51.695°N 1.638°W

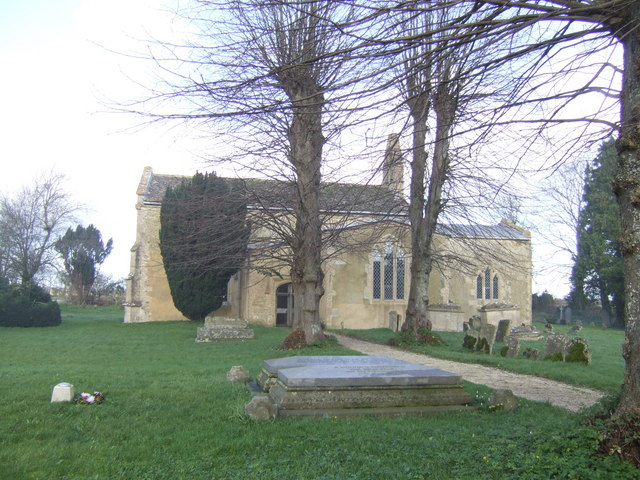
- St George's parish church

- Location within Oxfordshire
- Population: 198 (2011 Census)
- OS grid reference: SU2499
- Civil parish: Kelmscott
- District: West Oxfordshire
- Shire county: Oxfordshire
- Region: South East
- Country: England
- Sovereign state: United Kingdom
- Post town: Lechlade
- Postcode district: GL7
- Dialling code: 01367
- Police: Thames Valley
- Fire: Oxfordshire
- Ambulance: South Central
- UK Parliament: Witney
- Website: Kelmscott Village

Kelmscott is a village and civil parish on the River Thames in West Oxfordshire, about 2 miles (3 km) east of Lechlade in neighbouring Gloucestershire. Since 2001 it has absorbed Little Faringdon, which had been a separate civil parish. The 2011 Census recorded the merged parish's population as 198.

== Kelmscott Manor ==
Kelmscott Manor is a Cotswold stone house, built in about 1570 during the Great Rebuilding of England and extended late in the 17th century. It was the country home of William Morris from 1871 until his death in 1896. He drew great inspiration from the unspoilt authenticity of the house's architecture and craftsmanship, and its organic relationship with its setting. Kelmscott Manor now belongs to the Society of Antiquaries of London. Morris renamed his London town house Kelmscott House after Kelmscott when he bought it in April 1879. He named his private press, which he started in 1891, Kelmscott Press.

== Parish church ==
The nave of the Church of England parish church of Saint George was built in about 1190 in the transitional style between Norman and Early English, and the chancel is probably of the same date. The building has transepts that were added in about 1260. The clerestory of the nave was added in the 15th century. Many of the windows of the nave and chancel are Perpendicular Gothic additions, including the east window of the chancel. The church is a Grade II* listed building.

In the churchyard is the tomb of William Morris and his wife Jane Morris, designed by Philip Webb. William Morris featured the church in his novel News from Nowhere, when in the final part of the book the Guest is taken there for the feast. St George's parish is now part of the Benefice of Shill Valley and Broadshire, which includes also the parishes of Alvescot, Black Bourton, Broadwell, Broughton Poggs, Filkins, Holwell, Kencot, Langford, Little Faringdon, Shilton and Westwell. In the village, next to the pub The Plough Inn, are the remains of a 14th or 15th century cross.

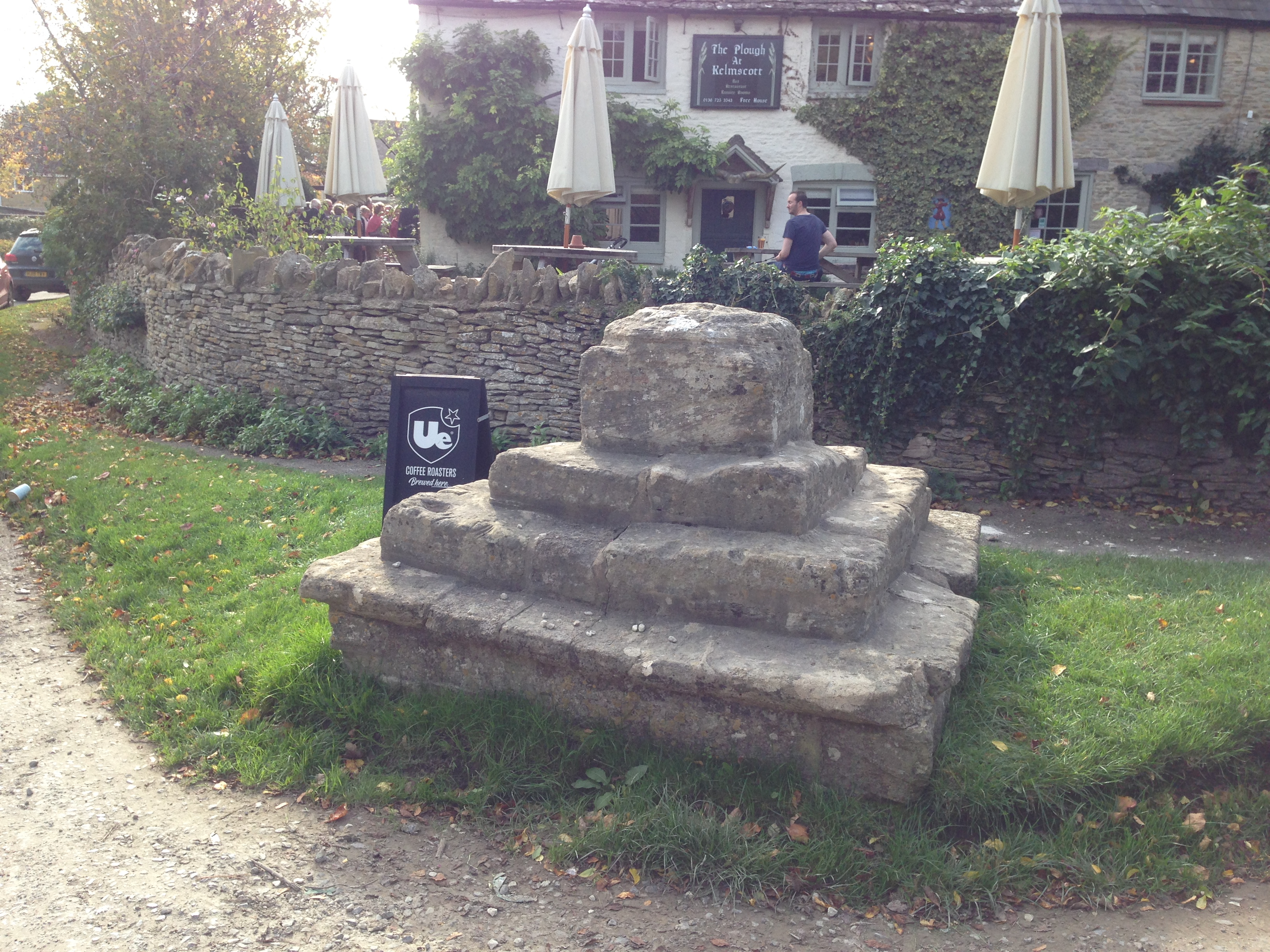
The remains of a 14th or 15th century cross outside The Plough Inn at Kelmscott

== Sources ==
- Sherwood, Jennifer; Pevsner, Nikolaus (1974). Oxfordshire. The Buildings of England. Harmondsworth: Penguin Books. pp. 665–667. ISBN 0-14-071045-0.
