= Richard Pace (architect) =

British builder and architect (c. 1760–1838)

- Born: circa 1760
- Died: 28 April 1838
- Occupation: Architect
- Buildings: Salperton Park

Richard Pace (c. 1760–1838) was a Georgian builder and architect in Lechlade, Gloucestershire, England. He served in the Life Guards 1784–88. Most of his known commissions were houses, in many cases for Church of England clergy. He also restored or refitted a small number of Church of England parish churches. He is commemorated by a monument in St. Lawrence's parish churchyard, Lechlade.

== Works ==
- Soho Square, London: house, 1791 or 1794 (demolished 1937)
- Bibury Club, Bibury, Gloucestershire: race stand, 1800 (since demolished)
- Woodhill Park, Bushton, Wiltshire: southeast range, 1804
- Manor Farm, Broadwell, Oxfordshire: house, 1804
- St. Lawrence, Lechlade, Gloucestershire: Old Vicarage, 1805
- Saint Mary's, Broughton, Oxfordshire: alterations to Rectory, 1808
- Saint Peter's, Broughton Poggs, Oxfordshire: alterations to Old Rectory, 1808
- Filkins Hall, Filkins, Oxfordshire: stables, 1809
- Saint James', Coln St. Dennis, Gloucestershire: Rectory, 1810
- Kingston Lisle, Oxfordshire: added wings to Kingston Lisle House, circa 1812.
- Saint Andrew's, Chinnor, Oxfordshire: Rectory, 1813
- Salperton Park, Salperton, Gloucestershire: country house, 1817
- Saint Mary's, Shipton-under-Wychwood, Oxfordshire: Vicarage, 1818
- Stone Farm, Sherborne, Gloucestershire: house, 1818
- Lodge at Black Horse Ridge, Birdlip, Gloucestershire, 1822
- Saint Lawrence' parish church, Lechlade, Gloucestershire: repairs, refitting and galleries, 1823 (all removed 1882)
- St. Nicholas, Oddington, Gloucestershire: alterations to Old Rectory, 1820
- Saint Giles', Coberley, Gloucestershire: Rectory, 1826
- Saint John the Baptist parish church, Burford, Oxfordshire: refitted interior 1826-27
- Saint Peter's parish church, Broadwell, Oxfordshire: gallery and other fittings, 1829
- Saint Matthew's parish church, Langford, Oxfordshire: restoration and new pews, 1829
- Saint Nicholas', Hatherop, Gloucestershire: Rectory, 1833 (now Severalls)
- Shrivenham Rectory 1805. (Shrivenham, Berks) Book 'Creating Paradise p. 230. Letter Rev Edward Berens, British Library ADD MS 73757

== Sources ==
- Colvin, H.M. (1997). A Biographical Dictionary of British Architects, 1600-1840. New Haven: Yale University Press. pp. 764–765. ISBN 0-300-07207-4.
- Pevsner, Nikolaus (1966). Berkshire. The Buildings of England. Harmondsworth: Penguin Books. p. 169.
- Pevsner, Nikolaus; Cherry, Bridget (revision) (1975) [1963]. Wiltshire. The Buildings of England. Harmondsworth: Penguin Books. p. 154. ISBN 0-14-071026-4.
- Sherwood, Jennifer; Pevsner, Nikolaus (1974). Oxfordshire. The Buildings of England. Harmondsworth: Penguin Books. ISBN 0-14-071045-0.
- Verey, David (1970). Gloucestershire: The Cotswolds. The Buildings of England. Harmondsworth: Penguin Books. ISBN 0-14-071040-X.
