= Broughton Poggs =

Village in Oxfordshire, England

Coordinates: 51.732°N 1.663°W

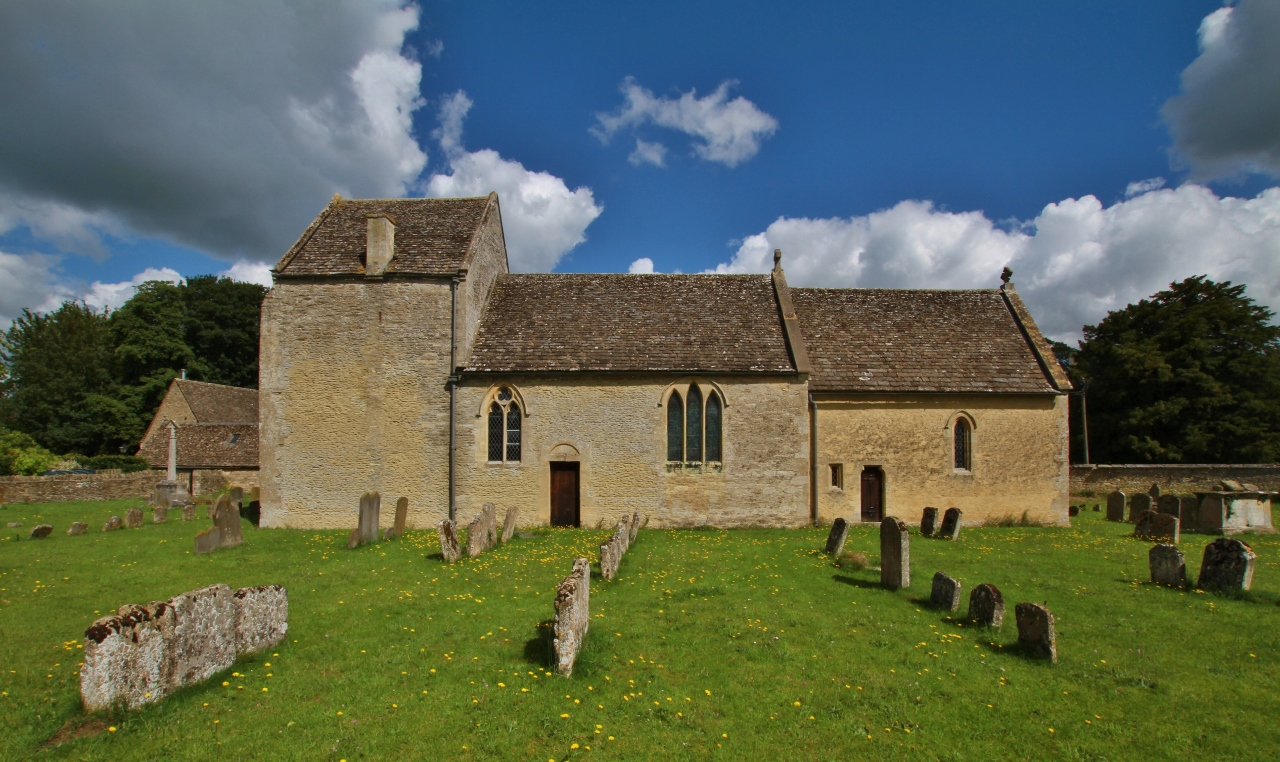
- St Peter's parish church

- Location within Oxfordshire
- OS grid reference: SP233038
- Civil parish: Filkins and Broughton Poggs
- District: West Oxfordshire
- Shire county: Oxfordshire
- Region: South East
- Country: England
- Sovereign state: United Kingdom
- Post town: Lechlade
- Postcode district: GL7
- Dialling code: 01367
- Police: Thames Valley
- Fire: Oxfordshire
- Ambulance: South Central
- UK Parliament: Witney
- Website: Filkins and Broughton Poggs

Broughton Poggs is a village in the civil parish of Filkins and Broughton Poggs, in the West Oxfordshire district, in the county of Oxfordshire, England. Broughton Poggs is 3 miles (5 km) southwest of Carterton.

== Parish church ==
Parts of the Church of England parish church of Saint Peter are early Norman, including the 12th-century nave and font. There is a small Norman window in the north wall. The chancel arch is also 12th-century but the squints that flank it are later insertions. Early English and Decorated Gothic windows have been inserted in the south wall of the nave. The lower part of the bell tower was built around 1200 and the chancel is late 13th century. The north porch may be 13th or 14th century. The south door is set in a Caernarvon arch. St Peter's was restored and altered in 1874, and is a Grade II* listed building. St Peter's parish is now part of the Benefice of Shill Valley and Broadshire, which includes also the parishes of Alvescot, Black Bourton, Broadwell, Filkins, Holwell, Kelmscott, Kencot, Langford, Little Faringdon, Shilton and Westwell.

== Other historic buildings ==
Broughton Hall was built in the 17th century and extended in the 18th century. The Old Rectory was also 17th century but has been much altered.

== Local government ==
Broughton Poggs was an ancient parish and became a civil parish in 1866. The parish included a detached part, Great Lemhill Farm, which was geographically in Gloucestershire. The farm was transferred to Gloucestershire by the Counties (Detached Parts) Act 1844, but remained in the parish until 1886, when it was transferred to the civil parish of Lechlade. The parish was within Witney Rural District. On 1 April 1954 the civil parish was merged with the parish of Filkins to form the civil parish of Filkins and Broughton Poggs. In 1951 the parish had a population of 63. The new parish has been part of West Oxfordshire since 1974.

== Sources ==
- Sherwood, Jennifer; Pevsner, Nikolaus (1974). Oxfordshire. The Buildings of England. Harmondsworth: Penguin Books. pp. 498–499. ISBN 0-14-071045-0.
