= Little Faringdon =

Village in Oxfordshire, England

Coordinates: 51.711°N 1.675°W

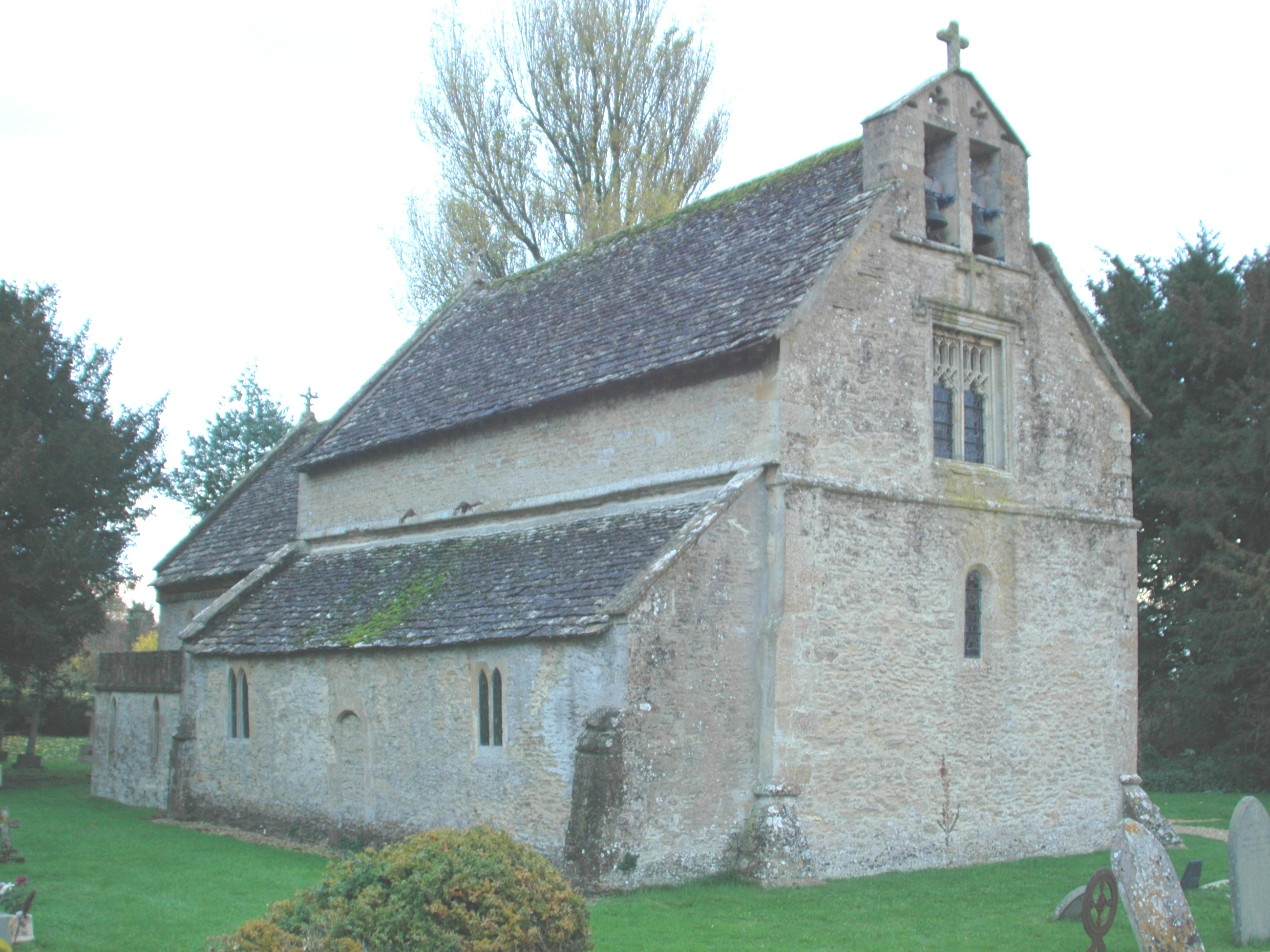
- St Margaret's parish church

- Location within Oxfordshire
- Population: 63 (2001 Census)
- OS grid reference: SP2201
- Civil parish: Little Faringdon
- District: West Oxfordshire
- Shire county: Oxfordshire
- Region: South East
- Country: England
- Sovereign state: United Kingdom
- Post town: Lechlade
- Postcode district: GL7
- Dialling code: 01367
- Police: Thames Valley
- Fire: Oxfordshire
- Ambulance: South Central
- UK Parliament: Witney

Little Faringdon is a village and civil parish in West Oxfordshire, about 1 mile (1.6 km) north of Lechlade in neighbouring Gloucestershire. The 2001 Census recorded its population as 63.

== Manor ==
In the late Anglo-Saxon era Little Faringdon was part of a large estate that included Faringdon (formally Great Faringdon), from which it took its name. The manor was one of several in the area granted to the Cistercian Beaulieu Abbey as part of its Faringdon estate by a charter of 1203 or 1204. Beaulieu held its estates until it had to surrender them to the Crown in the Dissolution of the Monasteries in 1538. The manor was then held by the Bourchier and Perrott families. In about 1860 it was sold to Charles Ponsonby, 2nd Baron de Mauley, whose descendants hold it today. Until the 20th century Little Faringdon was an estate village. In 1910 the lord of the manor owned almost all the houses.

== Local government ==
Little Faringdon was historically a township of the parish of Langford, which until the 13th century was in Oxfordshire. For the next six centuries it was an exclave of Berkshire, until the Counties (Detached Parts) Act 1844 returned it to Oxfordshire. In 1864 Little Faringdon was made a separate ecclesiastical parish and in 1866 a separate civil parish. Since the 1974 boundary changes it has been part of West Oxfordshire District. The parish has a parish meeting, but no parish council.

== Parish church ==
The parish church is Norman, built in the 12th century as a dependent chapelry of Langford. It has Norman lancet windows in the chancel. In about 1200 the church was enlarged with the addition of a north aisle. The arcade between the nave and north aisle is in a transitional style between Norman and Early English Gothic. In the 14th century the porch and south door were added. A south aisle seems to have been added at about the same time but has since been lost. In about 1500 two Perpendicular Gothic clerestory windows were added to south side of the nave. The west window of the nave is also a late Medieval Perpendicular Gothic addition.

The church became the parish church when Little Faringdon became a separate parish in 1864. The vicarage to the south of the church was designed by the Gothic Revival architect William Butterfield and completed in 1867. The church's original dedication is unknown. In 2000 it was dedicated to St Margaret of England. The church is a Grade II* listed building. The parish is now part of the Benefice of Shill Valley and Broadshire, which includes also the parishes of Alvescot, Black Bourton, Broadwell, Broughton Poggs, Filkins, Holwell, Kelmscott, Kencot, Langford, Shilton and Westwell.

== Gallery ==
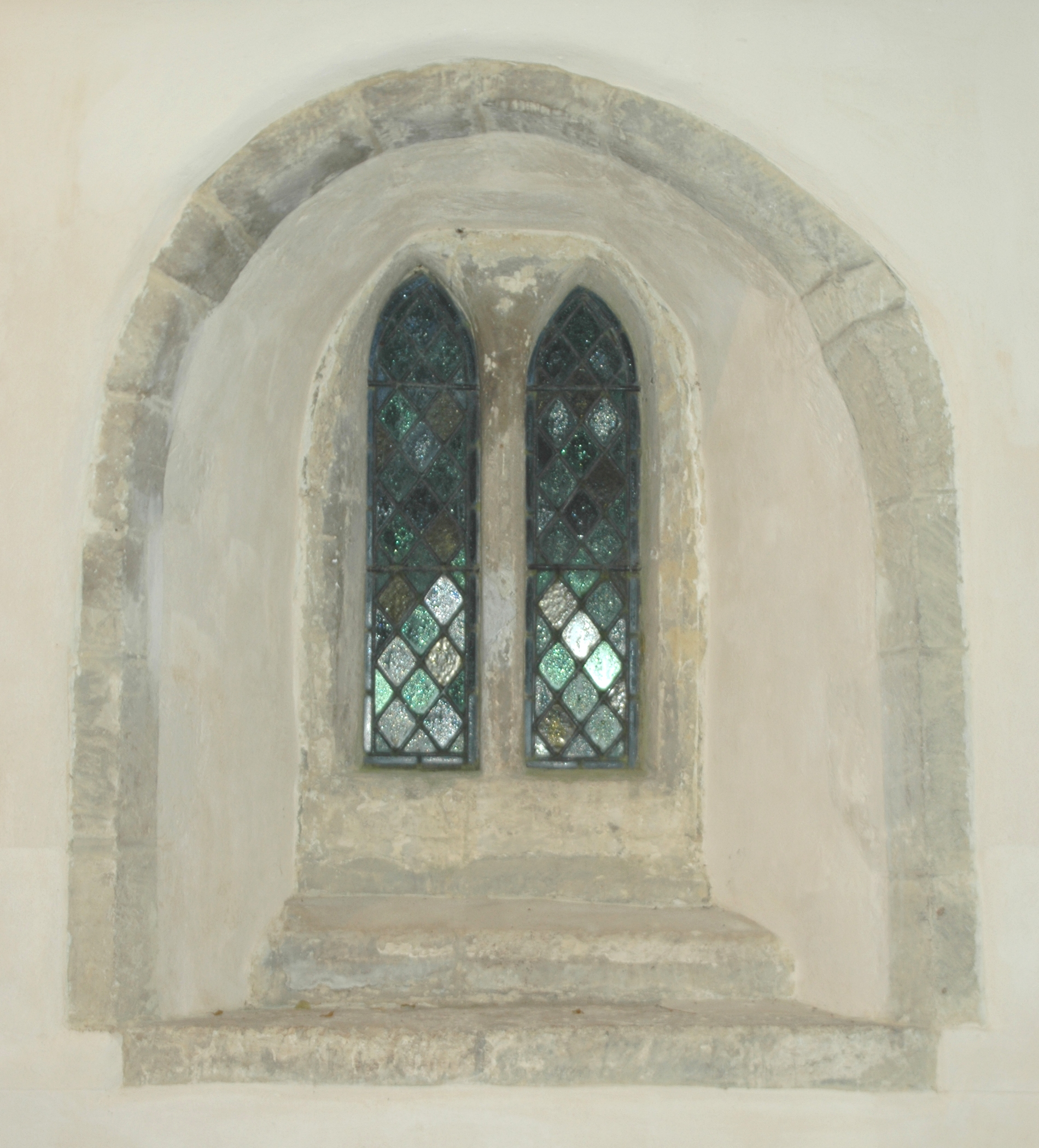
St Margaret's parish church: paired lancet windows in Norman opening

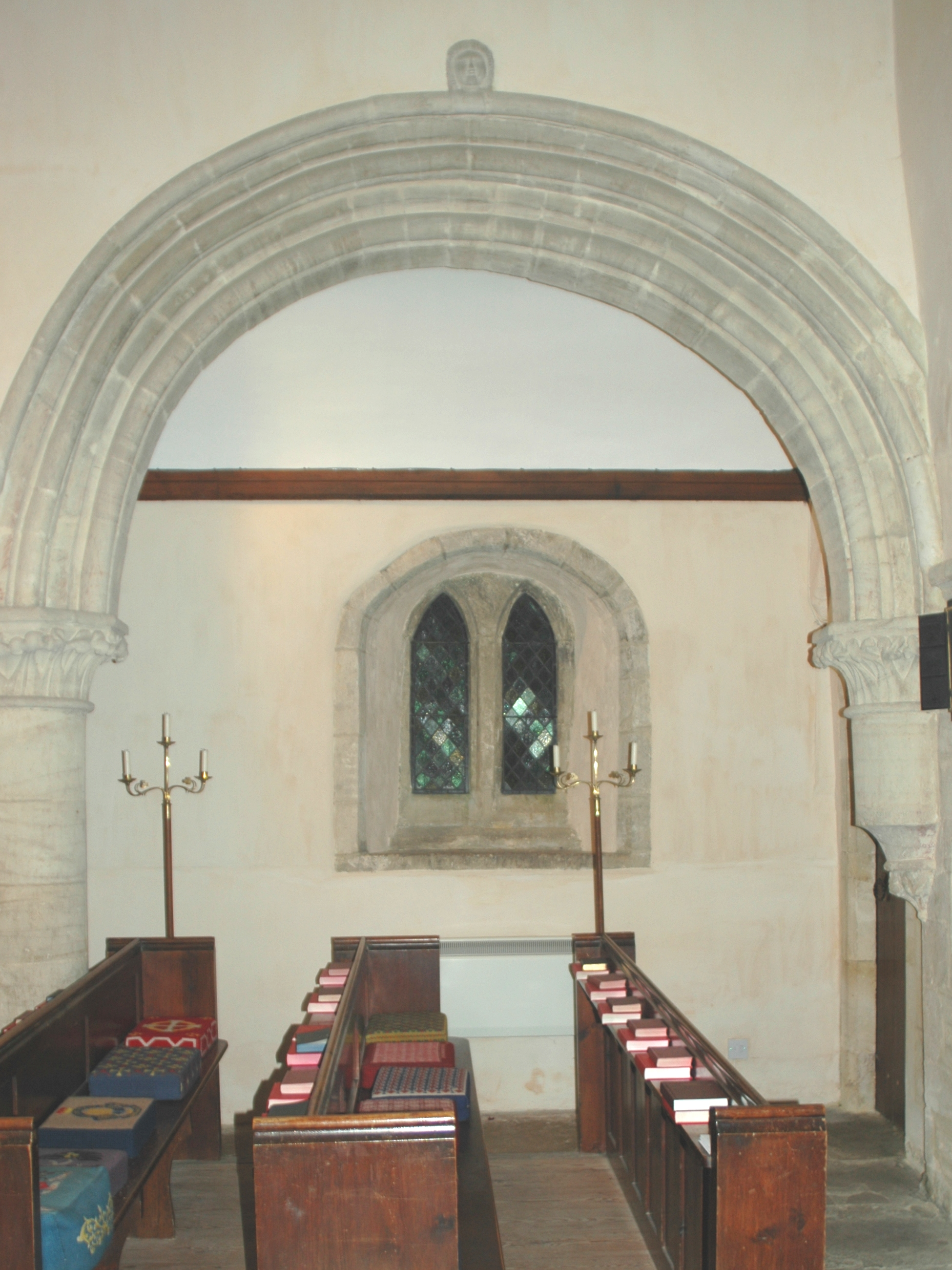
St Margaret's parish church: west arch of south arcade, with corbelled respond on west side

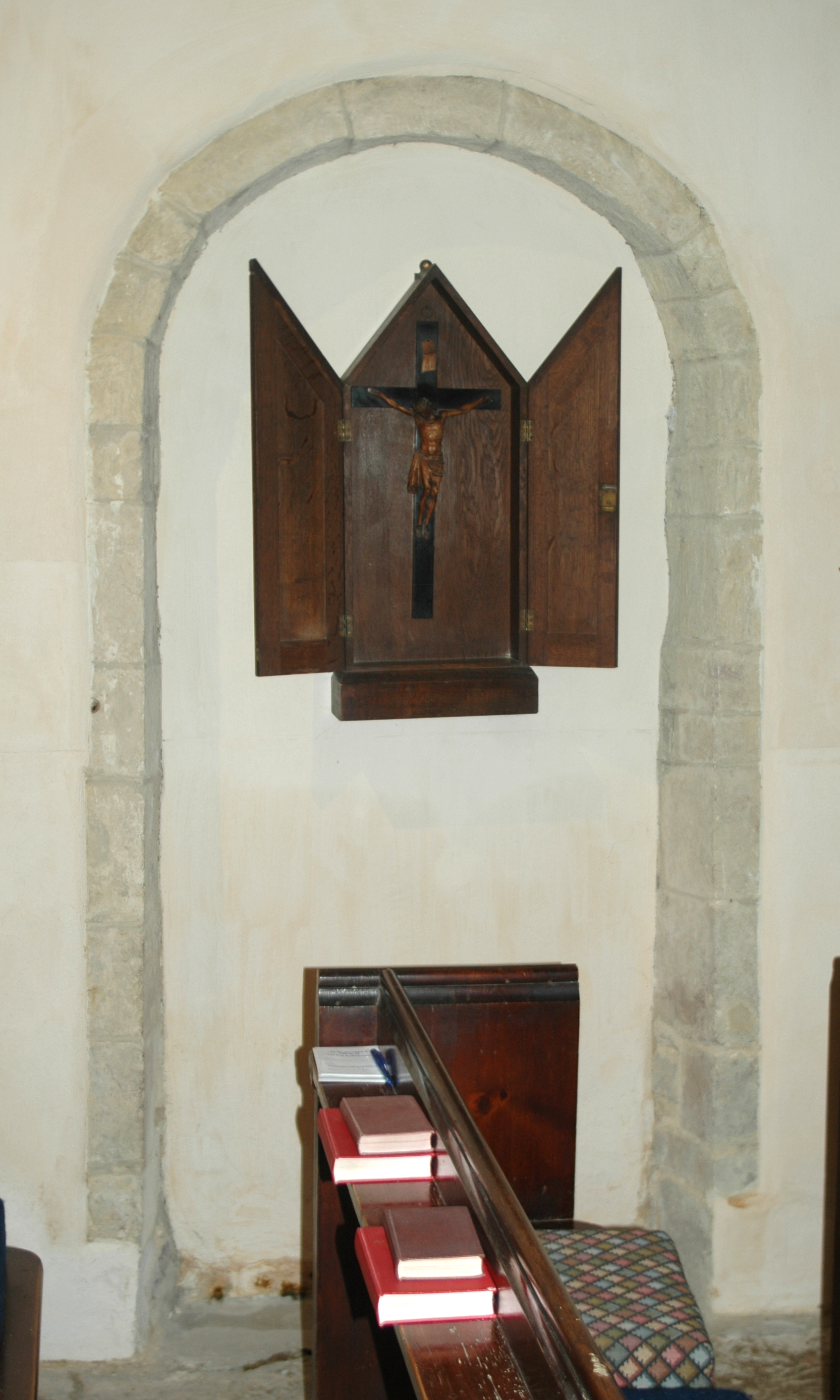
St Margaret's parish church: blocked Norman north doorway in north aisle

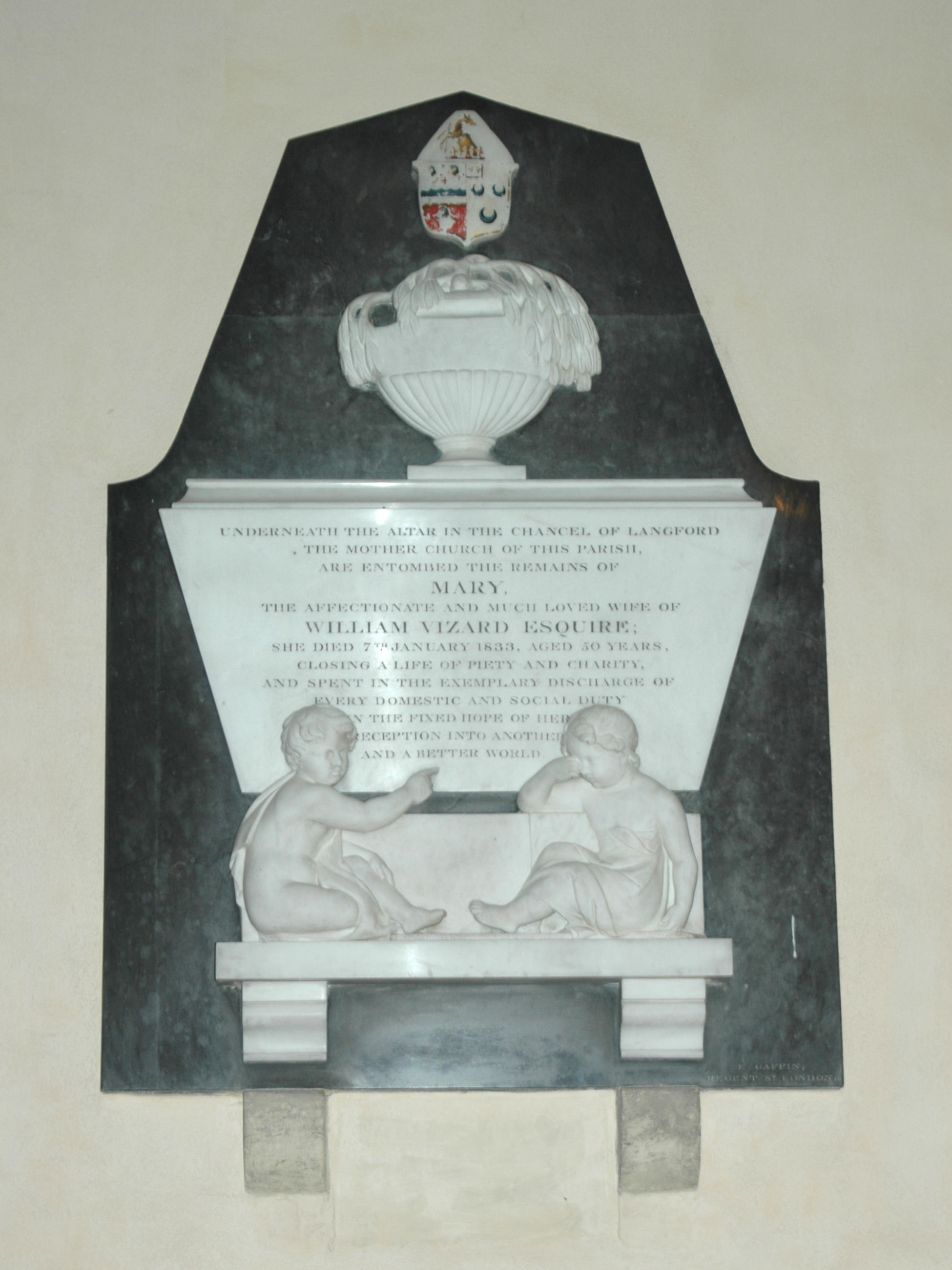
St Margaret's parish church: monument to Margaret Vizard, died 1833

== Sources ==
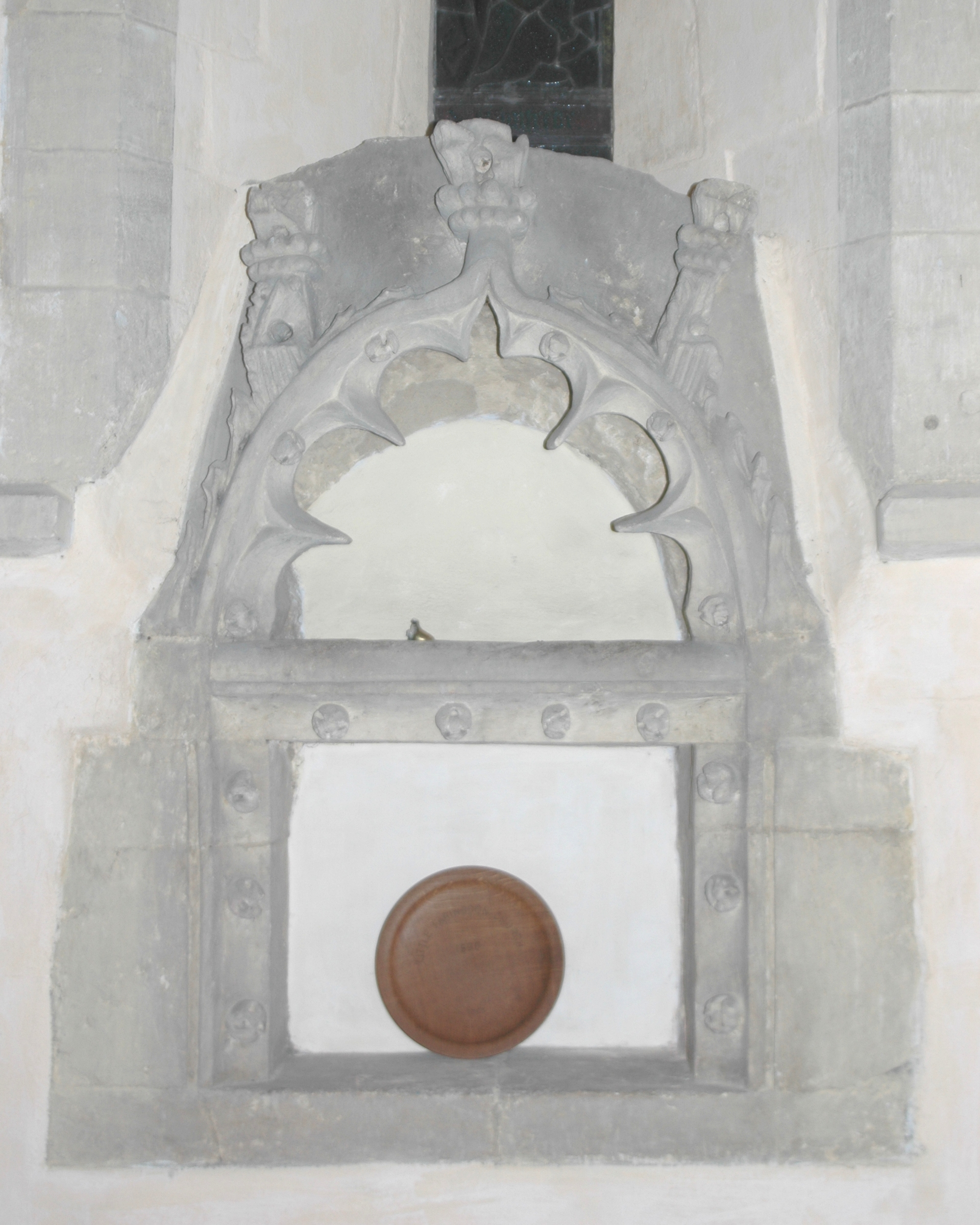
St Margaret's parish church: Perpendicular Gothic piscina

- Ditchfield, P.H.; Page, W.H., eds. (1907). A History of the County of Berkshire. Victoria County History. Vol. 2. London: Archibald Constable & Co. pp. 81–82.
- Sherwood, Jennifer; Pevsner, Nikolaus (1974). Oxfordshire. The Buildings of England. Harmondsworth: Penguin Books. pp. 684–685. ISBN 0-14-071045-0.
