= Sylvia Gray =

English businessperson and women's institute leader

Sylvia Gray CBE MBE
- Born: Sylvia Mary Gray; 3 July 1909; Rugby, Warwickshire, England
- Died: 27 April 1991 (aged 81); Burford, Oxfordshire, England
- Occupations: Businessperson; Women's institute leader
- Years active: 1929–1991
- Awards: Member of the Order of the British Empire; Commander of the Order of the British Empire

Sylvia Mary Gray CBE MBE (3 July 1909 – 27 April 1991) was an English businessperson and women's institute leader. She was the owner of the former coaching inn the Bay Tree Hotel in Burford, Oxfordshire that employed female members of staff for a career in hotel management and was a member of Witney Rural District Council, serving as its vice-chair for her final four years there. Gray was chair of the National Federation of Women's Institutes (NFWI) between 1969 and 1974 and was a member of various boards of public bodies. She was made a Member of the Order of the British Empire in 1952 and was upgraded to Commander of the Order of the British Empire in 1975.

== Early life ==
Gray was born at 44 Clifton Road in Rugby, Warwickshire on 3 July 1909 and was the daughter of the racquet maker Henry Bunting Gray (whose family had made rackets coaches at Rugby School since 1867) and his wife Elizabeth Mary Frost. She had two siblings. Gray was taught at Wroxall Abbey.

== Career ==
In 1929, she joined the Burford and Fulbrook branch of the Women's Institute (WI). Gray purchased the former coaching inn the Bay Tree Hotel in Burford, Oxfordshire in the Cotswolds in 1935, and she would own and run the hotel for near to the next half a century. She operated the hotel with women employed as members of staff, who received training for a career in hotel management, and a single male chauffeur/gardener. Following the Second World War, Gray purchased a second hotel, the Manor House in another Cotswolds town, Moreton-in-Marsh, Gloucestershire. She established Bay Tree Hotels Ltd which she chaired until 1983.

From 1943 to 1954, Gray served as a member of the Witney Rural District Council and was vice-chair for the final four years of that period. She was chairperson of the board of governors at Burford Grammar School. Gray was elected chair of the National Federation of Women's Institutes (NFWI) in 1969 following a period in which she served on its executive committee. She remained in the post until 1974. Grey oversaw a change in the WI's constitution which was a rule that stated "the character of the movement is non-sectarian and non-party political." A 1971 resolution clarified that this meant it should have not been interpreted as stopping the WI village from being concerned with issues relating to religion and politics "provided the movement is never used for party-political or sectarian propaganda." Although she anticipated that a debate on the resolution would be fraught, she was aware the WI had to adapt to changing conditions, believing that "the time seemed just right to rely on the common sense of the members not to allow themselves to be used for party political purposes", enabling the WI to comment more publicly on government legislation that affected women, especially countryside women while the WI stayed apolitical.

Gray ensured the NFWI was aware of the importance of being financially stable as a national appeal setup during its Golden Jubilee in 1965 had raised £500,000. This enabled the helping to finance the construction of a new accommodation and teaching blocks at the WI adult education college, Denman College. She was responsible for introducing management consultants to advise on improvements to the WI's administrative structure and established a public relations position. Gray setup the permanent music choir called WI Music Society in 1970 with encouragement from the composer Antony Hopkins and inaugurated the NFWI/Green Shield Stamps tennis championship. She oversaw an increase in subscription rates with an increase in services to members and more people joined the WI as members.

She was on the executive committee of the Keep Britain Tidy Group between 1969 and 1978 and was chair of the National Trust's South Midlands Regional Committee from 1975 to 1981. Gray was a member of the National Consumer Council between 1975 and 1977 and from 1977 to 1984 the Redundant Churches Committee. She was also a member of the Post Office Users’ National Council, the Women's National Commission, and the IBA Advertising Standards Advisory Committee.

== Personal life ==
In 1952, Gray was appointed Member of the Order of the British Empire "for service in local government", and was upgraded to Commander of the Order of the British Empire in 1975 "in recognition of her public service nationally on bodies". On 27 April 1991, she died at her home in Burford. Gray did not marry. She was privately cremated on 1 May 1991, and a memorial service for her was held at the Church of St John the Baptist, Burford on 21 May.
