= Filkins and Broughton Poggs =

Coordinates: 51.736°N 1.657°W

- Civil parish
- Location within Oxfordshire
- Civil parish: Filkins and Broughton Poggs
- District: West Oxfordshire
- Shire county: Oxfordshire
- Region: South East
- Country: England
- Sovereign state: United Kingdom
- Post town: Lechlade
- Postcode district: GL7
- Dialling code: 01367
- Police: Thames Valley
- Fire: Oxfordshire
- Ambulance: South Central
- UK Parliament: Witney

Filkins and Broughton Poggs is a civil parish in West Oxfordshire, on the Oxfordshire county boundary with Gloucestershire. The parish includes the villages of Filkins and Broughton Poggs, which were separate civil parishes until they were merged in 1954. The population in the 2011 Census was 434.
