= Witney Rural District =

District in Oxfordshire, England

Coordinates: 51.7933°N 1.4791°W

- Rural district
- Population
  - 1901: 16,395
  - 1971: 33,800
- History
  - Created: 28 December 1894
  - Abolished: 31 March 1974
  - Succeeded by: West Oxfordshire
  - HQ: Witney
- Contained within
  - County Council: Oxfordshire

Witney Rural District was a rural district in Oxfordshire, England from 1894 to 1974. It surrounded but did not include the town of Witney.

== History ==
The district had its origins in the Witney Poor Law Union, which had been created in 1835, covering the town of Witney and surrounding parishes. A workhouse was built in 1835–1836 on Tower Hill (then called Razor Hill) in Witney to serve the area. In 1872, sanitary districts were established, with responsibility for public health and local government given to the boards of guardians of poor law unions for areas without urban authorities. The Witney Rural Sanitary District therefore covered the area of the Witney Poor Law Union except for the parish of Witney itself, which was a local government district and so formed its own urban sanitary district.

Under the Local Government Act 1894, rural sanitary districts became rural districts from 28 December 1894. The act also directed that districts should not straddle county boundaries. Whilst the Witney Rural Sanitary District was entirely in Oxfordshire, the neighbouring Faringdon Rural Sanitary District straddled Berkshire, Gloucestershire, and Oxfordshire. It was therefore agreed before the act came into force that five Oxfordshire parishes from the Faringdon Rural Sanitary District would be added to the Witney Rural District.

Witney Rural District Council held its first meeting at the workhouse in Witney on 3 January 1895. Robert Lowridge Baker, vicar of Ramsden, was appointed the council's first chairman.

== Premises ==
Until at least the First World War, the council was based at the Witney Union Workhouse on Tower Hill. It later used various premises in Witney as its offices, including Blanket Hall at 100 High Street between the 1920s and 1950s, and Hillside at 6 Market Square in the 1950s and 1960s. Around 1966 the council moved to a large Victorian house called Springfield at 39 Woodgreen in Witney, remaining based there until the council's abolition in 1974.

== Abolition ==
Witney Rural District was abolished under the Local Government Act 1972, with the area becoming part of West Oxfordshire on 1 April 1974. West Oxfordshire District Council continues to be based at Springfield, although the building is now simply called Council Offices, Woodgreen.
