= Filkins =

Village in Oxfordshire, England

Coordinates: 51.736°N 1.656°W

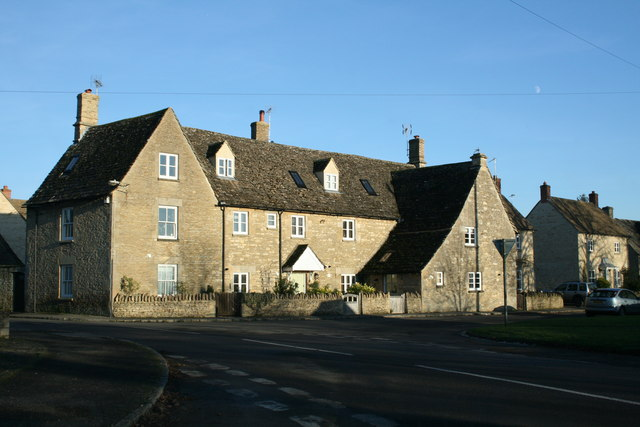
- Formerly The Lamb

- Location within Oxfordshire
- OS grid reference: SP238041
- Civil parish: Filkins and Broughton Poggs
- District: West Oxfordshire
- Shire county: Oxfordshire
- Region: South East
- Country: England
- Sovereign state: United Kingdom
- Post town: Lechlade
- Postcode district: GL7
- Dialling code: 01367
- Police: Thames Valley
- Fire: Oxfordshire
- Ambulance: South Central
- UK Parliament: Witney
- Website: Filkins & Broughton Poggs

Filkins is a village in the civil parish of Filkins and Broughton Poggs, in the West Oxfordshire district, in the county of Oxfordshire, England. It is about 2.5 miles (4 km) southwest of Carterton.

== Churches ==
=== Church of England ===
The Gothic Revival architect G. E. Street designed the Church of England parish church of Saint Peter, and it was built in 1855–57. The parish is now part of the benefice of Shill Valley and Broadshire.

=== Methodist ===
The Methodist chapel was dedicated in 1833.

== Local government ==
Filkins was historically a chapelry in the ancient parish (and civil parish from 1866) of Broadwell. It became a separate civil parish in 1866, on 25 March 1886 the parish was abolished and merged with Broadwell. On 26 March 1894 Filkins became a civil parish again, being formed from part of Broadwell, and was within Witney Rural District. On 1 April 1954 the civil parish was merged with the parish of Broughton Poggs to form the civil parish of Filkins and Broughton Poggs, part of West Oxfordshire since 1974. In 1951 the parish had a population of 371.

== Social and economic history ==
Swinford Museum occupies a 17th-century cottage in Filkins and stands alongside the former village lock-up. George Swinford founded the museum in 1931 with the help of Labour politician and landowner Stafford Cripps.

Stafford Cripps worked with architect Percy Richard Morley Horder and the local stonemason George Swynford on the provision of council housing in the village. Cripps insisted that the new buildings should be of stone and stylistically in keeping with local vernacular traditions, meeting the difference in cost for the council housing, re-opening quarries on his own land to provide building. This was recorded in Country Life. As a result, by 1944 Filkins was being hailed as 'a modernised village' and 'an illustration of contemporary village planning', in an article in Country Life by Christopher Hussey.

In 2007 the Filkins estate, which John Cripps (son of the post-war Labour minister Stafford Cripps) bequeathed upon his death in 1993, but which had been partly passed over to the Ernest Cook Trust since then, was fully transferred to the Trust's portfolio. The Filkins Estate is on the county boundary between Gloucestershire and Oxfordshire and includes one 500 acres (200 ha) farm and a number of cottages, with a small area of commercial units housing the Cotswold Woollen Weavers and Filkins Stone Company.

== Amenities ==
Filkins has a public house, the Five Alls. The village has an outdoor swimming pool owned by the Centre Trust which was established by Sir Stafford Cripps under the control of the parish council (acting as trustees). The pool, now managed by the Filkins Swimming Club, is open from May until September. Next to it are the village shop, post office and bowls club. A large 18th-century barn is now the premises of Cotswold Woollen Weavers, which set up business there in 1982, and is the last company in the area to uphold the traditions of woollen cloth design and manufacture. Filkins has a theatre club. The former village school is now a pre-school nursery.

== Sources and further reading ==
- Fisher, A.S.T. (1968). The History of Broadwell, Oxfordshire, with Filkins, Kelmscott and Holwell. privately published.
- Sherwood, Jennifer; Pevsner, Nikolaus (1974). Oxfordshire. The Buildings of England. Harmondsworth: Penguin Books. p. 604. ISBN 0-14-071045-0.
- Swinford, George (1987). The Jubilee Boy. The Filkins Press.
