= A. S. T. Fisher =

British writer (1906–1989)

Arthur Stanley Theodore Fisher
- Born: 1906
- Died: 1989
- Education: Christ Church, Oxford
- Occupations: clergyman, writer, poet, novelist
- Writing career
- Pen name: Michael Scarrott

Arthur Stanley Theodore Fisher (1906 – 1989) was an English priest and writer. He wrote a number of poems, religious works and local histories as A. S. T. Fisher and one novel under the pseudonym Michael Scarrott.

== Family ==
Fisher was born in 1906, the son of Ruth Alice Fisher and Reverend Arthur Bryan Fisher (1870–1955), a Church of England priest who was a Church Missionary Society missionary in the Uganda Protectorate. Fisher was married and had a daughter.

== Education ==
Fisher studied at Christ Church, Oxford, where he lived on the same stair as W. H. Auden. The two students had frequent late-night arguments about religion, and in 1925, Fisher reintroduced Auden to Christopher Isherwood. In 1926, Auden's mother, Constance, was concerned about her son, so Fisher wrote to her "the fact that he is naturally more self-sufficient than most people explains why he finds so little need for a personal God – or for a Mother".

In 1928, the journal Oxford Poetry published three of Fisher's poems.

== Career ==
By early 1934, Fisher was chaplain of the recently founded Bryanston School, a public school in Dorset, but had left by February 1935. By 1952, he was chaplain of Magdalen College School, Oxford, and by 1970, he was Vicar of Westwell, Oxfordshire.

Fisher wrote books of prayers and other Christian matters, poems, and later three histories of parishes in West Oxfordshire. Longman published his An Anthology of Prayers Compiled for use in School and Home in 1934 and republished it a number of times from 1943 to 1959. Under the pseudonym of Michael Scarrott, Fisher wrote a gay novel set in a fictitious Dorset public school, which Reginald Caton's Fortune Press published in 1955. The novel was illustrated by Fisher's son-in-law, B.H. (Barry) Surie.

== Works ==
=== As A. S. T. Fisher ===
- An Anthology of Prayers Compiled for use in School and Home. London: Longman. 1934.
- Voice and Versed: an Anthology in Three Parts for Community-Speaking in Schools – Selected and Edited. Cambridge: Cambridge University Press. 1946.
- The Comet and Earlier Poems. Frederick Muller. 1948.
- Happy Families. The Meaning of Sex for Young Teenagers. 1961.
- 50 Days to Easter. Devotional Readings for the Lenten Season. London: A.R. Mowbray. 1964.
- The History of Broadwell, Oxfordshire, with Filkins, Kelmscott and Holwell. privately published. 1968.
- The History of Kencot, Oxfordshire. privately published. 1970.
- History of Westwell, Oxfordshire. Bear Court Books. 1972. ISBN 0950169013.
- Records of Christianity, Volume II: Christendom (6th–14th centuries). Oxford: Basil Blackwell. 1977. ISBN 0631171703.
- Selected Poems. Oxford: privately published. 1978.

=== As Michael Scarrott ===
- Ambassador of Loss. The Fortune Press. 1955.
