= Langford, Oxfordshire =

Village in Oxfordshire, England

Coordinates: 51.726°N 1.643°W

Langford
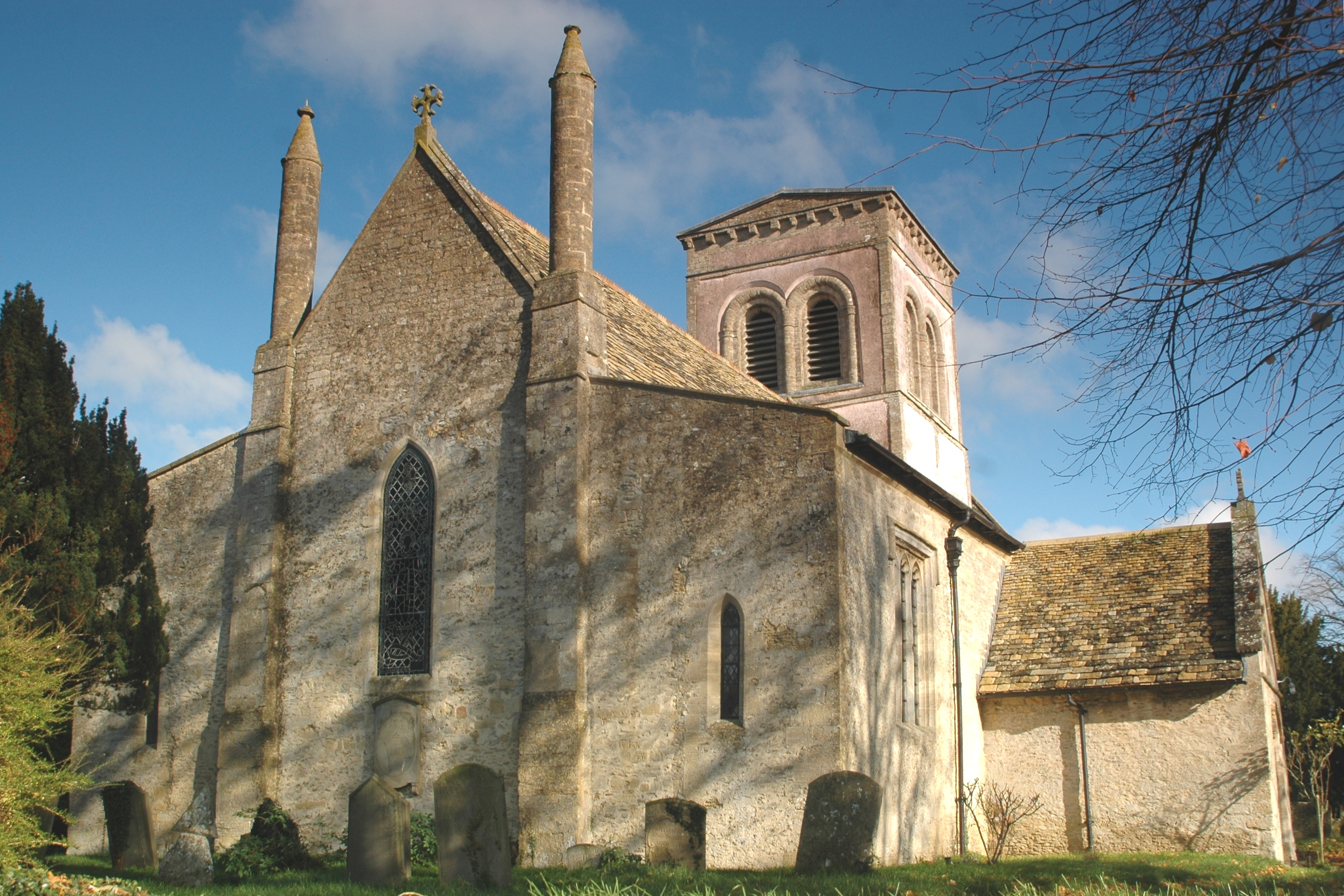
- west view of St. Matthew's parish church

- Location within Oxfordshire
- Population: 374 (Parish, 2021)
- OS grid reference: SP2402
- Civil parish: Langford
- District: West Oxfordshire
- Shire county: Oxfordshire
- Region: South East
- Country: England
- Sovereign state: United Kingdom
- Post town: Lechlade
- Postcode district: GL7
- Dialling code: 01367
- Police: Thames Valley
- Fire: Oxfordshire
- Ambulance: South Central
- UK Parliament: Witney
- Website: LangfordGL7

Langford is a village and civil parish in the West Oxfordshire district of Oxfordshire, England. It lies about 3 miles (5 km) northeast of Lechlade in neighbouring Gloucestershire. At the 2021 census the parish had a population of 374.

== Archaeology ==
In 1943 a set of ring ditch enclosures was excavated at Langford Downs, in the western part of Langford parish close to the Gloucestershire boundary about 1 mile (1.6 km) southeast of Southrop. Fragments of Belgic pottery found at the site suggest that it was occupied in the Iron Age and abandoned before the Roman occupation of Britain.

== Manor ==
The Domesday Book of 1086 records that a Saxon, Ælfsige of Faringdon, held the manor. In the reign of Edward the Confessor Ælfsige had been a minor landholder, holding two hides of land at Littleworth. After the Norman Conquest of England he amassed an estate of six manors totalling 40 hides spread across Oxfordshire, Berkshire and Gloucestershire.

== Parish church ==
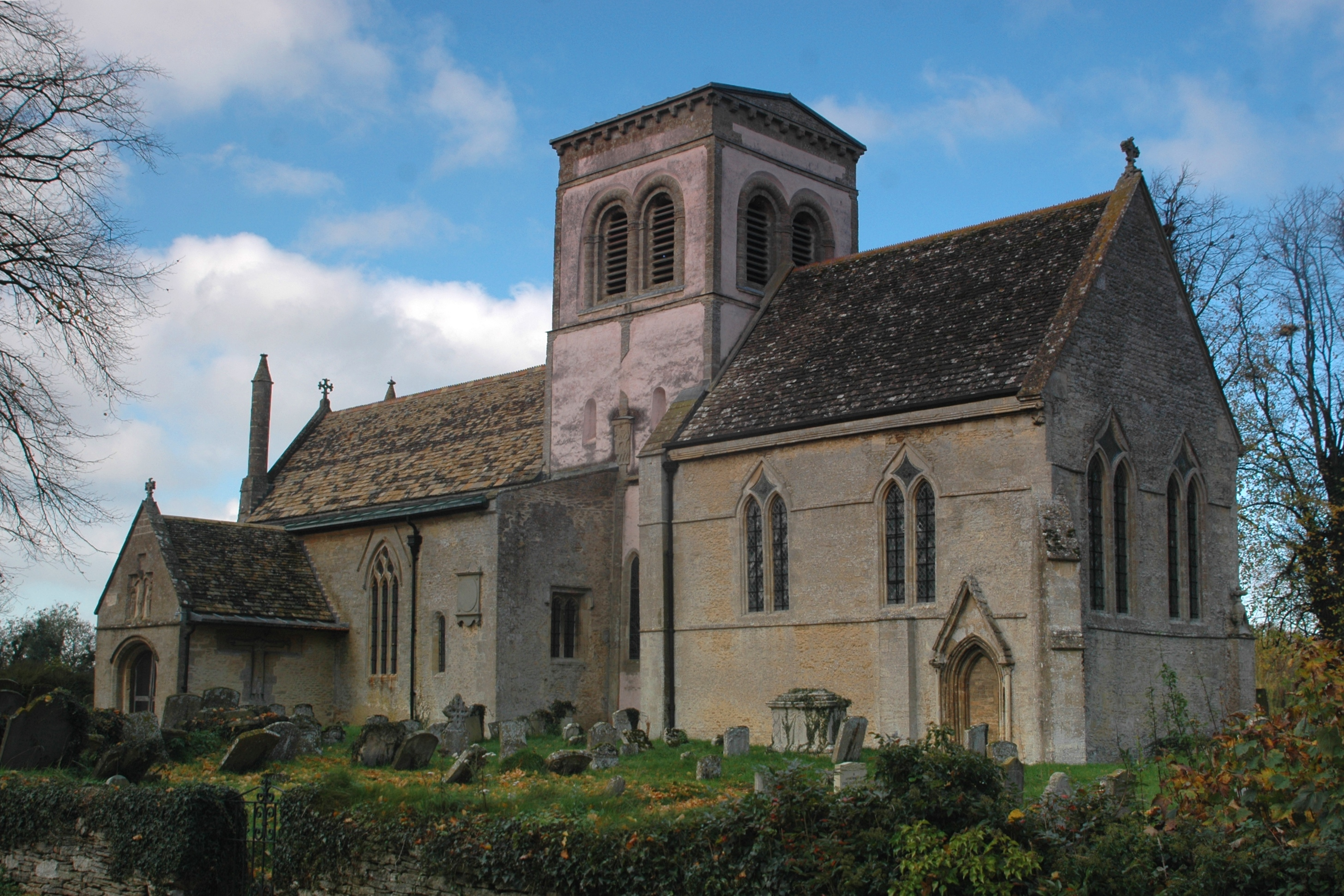
St. Matthew's parish church from the south-east

The Church of England parish church of Saint Matthew is Saxon. In about 1200 the Early English Gothic north and south aisles were added, and in the 13th century the chancel was rebuilt. Some of the windows are 14th and 15th century Decorated Gothic and Perpendicular Gothic additions. Two flying buttresses were added to the north side of the church in 1574. The architect Richard Pace restored the building in 1829 and the Gothic Revival architect Ewan Christian restored the nave roof to its original pitch in 1864. The tower has a ring of six bells.

== Governance ==
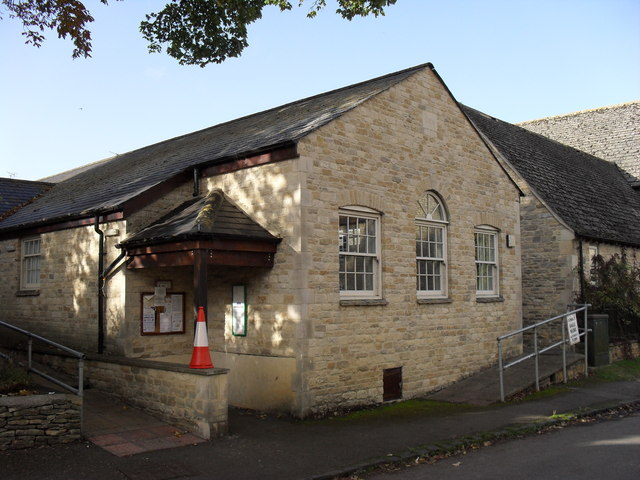
Langford Village Hall

There are three tiers of local government covering Langford, at parish, district and county level: Langford Parish Council, West Oxfordshire District Council, and Oxfordshire County Council. The parish council meets at Langford Village Hall on Filkins Road, which was completed in 2000.

=== Administrative history ===
Langford was an ancient parish in the Bampton hundred of Oxfordshire. The parish was subdivided into four townships: Grafton, Little Faringdon, Radcot, and a Langford township covering the northern part of the parish including the village itself. Little Faringdon was also a chapelry, having its own chapel of ease. In the 13th century the two townships of Langford and Little Faringdon were transferred from Oxfordshire to become a detached part of Berkshire. The Grafton and Radcot townships stayed in Oxfordshire, and so the parish then straddled the two counties; a situation which continued until 1844, when Langford and Little Faringdon were restored to Oxfordshire. Each township took on civil functions under the poor laws from the 17th century onwards. As such, the four townships each became separate civil parishes in 1866 when the legal definition of 'parish' was changed to be the areas used for administering the poor laws.

== Former railway ==
In 1873 the East Gloucestershire Railway between Witney and Fairford was built past the village. It was operated by the Great Western Railway, which in 1907 opened Kelmscott and Langford Halt 0.5 miles (800 m) outside the village. British Railways closed the railway and halt in 1962.

== Amenities ==
Langford has one public house, the Bell Inn.

== Sources ==
- Cotterill, Derek (2008). St Matthew's Langford. Langford, Oxfordshire: Parish of St. Matthew, Langford. pp. 3, 4.
- Sherwood, Jennifer; Pevsner, Nikolaus (1974). Oxfordshire. The Buildings of England. Harmondsworth: Penguin Books. pp. 678–680. ISBN 0-14-071045-0.
- Williams, Audrey (1946–47). "Excavation at Langford Downs, Oxon. (near Lechlade) in 1943" (PDF). Oxoniensia. XI–XII. Oxford Architectural and Historical Society: 44–64.
