= Broadwell, Oxfordshire =

Village in Oxfordshire, England

Coordinates: 51.736°N 1.642°W

Broadwell
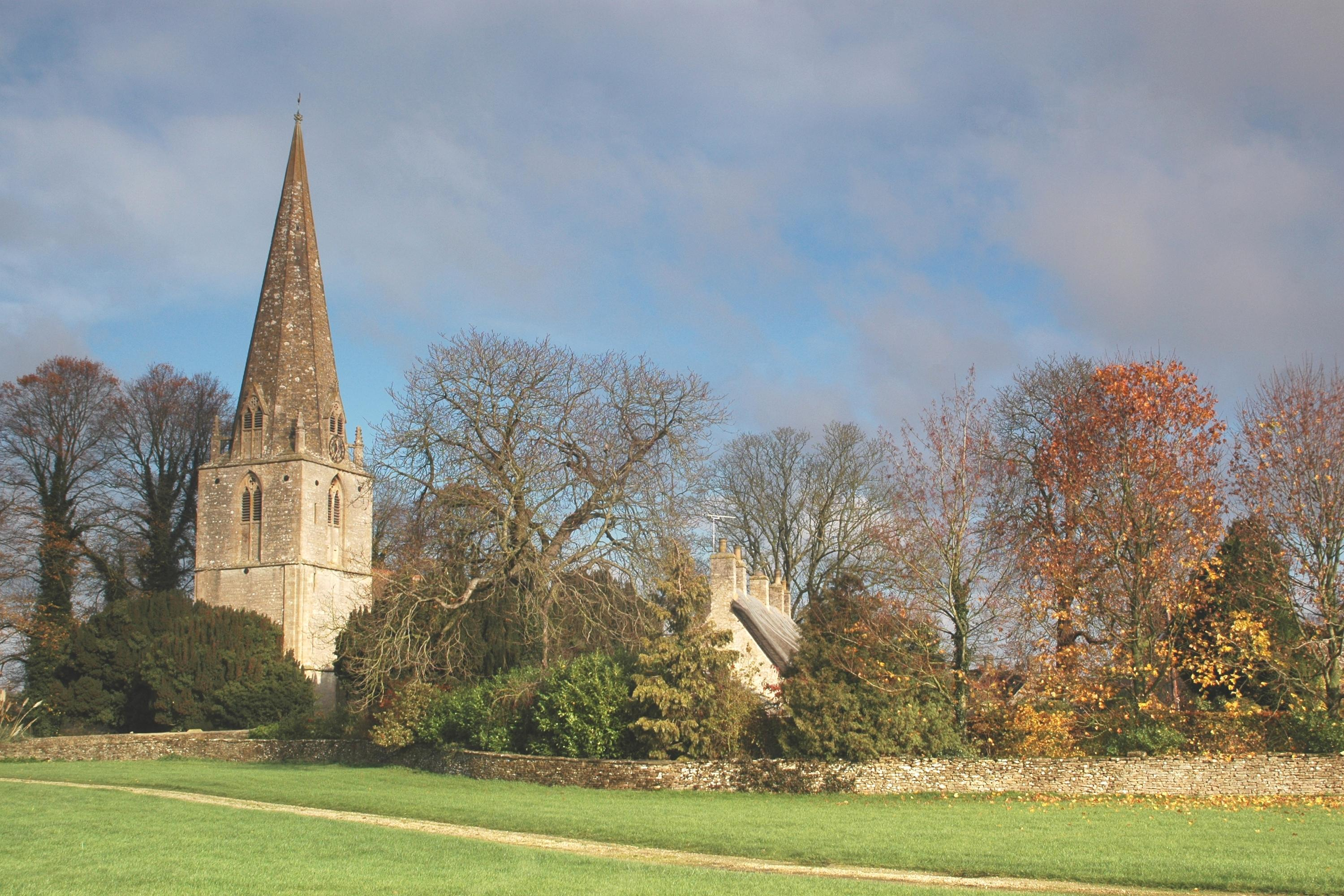
- Thatched roofs and St Peter's steeple from the south-west

- Location within Oxfordshire
- Population: 218 (2011 Census)
- OS grid reference: SP2503
- Civil parish: Broadwell
- District: West Oxfordshire
- Shire county: Oxfordshire
- Region: South East
- Country: England
- Sovereign state: United Kingdom
- Post town: Lechlade
- Postcode district: GL7
- Dialling code: 01367
- Police: Thames Valley
- Fire: Oxfordshire
- Ambulance: South Central
- UK Parliament: Witney

Broadwell is a village and civil parish about 2 miles (3 km) south-west of Carterton in West Oxfordshire. The 2011 Census recorded the parish's population as 218.

== Parish church ==
The Church of England parish church of Saints Peter and Paul is a late Norman church built in about 1190. In about 1250 the bell tower and octagonal spire were built, the north and south transepts were added, the chancel remodelled and an arch was inserted in the north wall of the chancel, linking it to a new north chapel. The south wall of the chancel also has a window added early in the 14th century. A Perpendicular Gothic arch linking the north transept and chapel was inserted. In the 15th century a stair-turret was added to reach a room over the north transept. The church was restored under the direction of E.G. Bruton in 1873. It is a Grade I listed building.

It is believed that the Knights Templar were the benefactors of Broadwell Church. Its history is linked to the rise and fall in power of the Templars. Land, which included that at Broadwell, was gifted to them after they were officially adopted and sanctioned by the Roman Catholic Church in the 12th century.

Unlike many Christian churches, the church at Broadwell doesn’t face east but north-east which accords with the Templar’s practice of aligning churches with sunrise on the Patronal Saint’s day. The 29th June is the feast day for the Saints Peter and Paul.

The tower has an historic ring of five bells from the 14th to the 17th centuries, plus a more recent Sanctus bell. Currently all are unringable. The second bell is the oldest, cast by an unknown founder in about 1349. The tenor was cast in about 1500 by Thomas Hasylwood, whose kinsman William Hasylwood had bell-foundries at Reading and Wokingham. The fourth bell was cast in 1581 by Joseph Carter, whose kinsman William Carter was a bell-founder at Reading and then at the Whitechapel Bell Foundry. Edward Neale of Burford cast the third bell in 1653 and the treble in 1663. Thomas Rudhall of Gloucester cast the Sanctus bell in 1778. The parish is now part of the Benefice of Shill Valley and Broadshire.

== Village cross ==
By the main road through the village near the parish church are the remains of a Medieval village cross. It comprises a stone shaft set on an octagonal base of four steps, probably made in the 15th century. It is Grade II* listed.

== RAF Broadwell ==
RAF Broadwell was an airfield 2 miles (3 km) north of Broadwell, actually in the adjacent parish of Kencot. The airfield was in service from 1943 until 1947 and was used by Royal Air Force Transport Command.

== Amenities ==
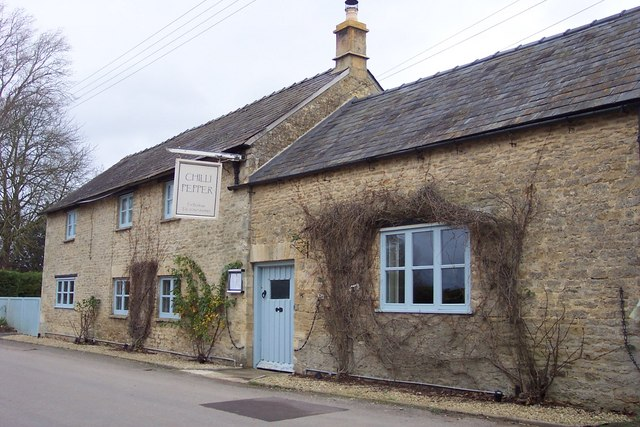
The Chilli Pepper bed and breakfast, formerly the Five Bells pub

Broadwell had a public house, the Five Bells. It was the Chilli Pepper bed and breakfast house. It is now closed.

== Attractions ==
The Cotswold Wildlife Park is within the parish.

== Sources and further reading ==
- Fisher, A.S.T. (1968). The History of Broadwell, Oxfordshire, with Filkins, Kelmscott and Holwell. privately published.
- Marples, B.J. (1973). "The Medieval Crosses of Oxfordshire" (PDF). Oxoniensia. XXXVIII. Oxfordshire Architectural and Historical Society: 307.
- Sherwood, Jennifer; Pevsner, Nikolaus (1974). Oxfordshire. The Buildings of England. Harmondsworth: Penguin Books. pp. 488–490. ISBN 0-14-071045-0.
