= Kencot =

Village in Oxfordshire, England

Coordinates: 51.741°N 1.633°W

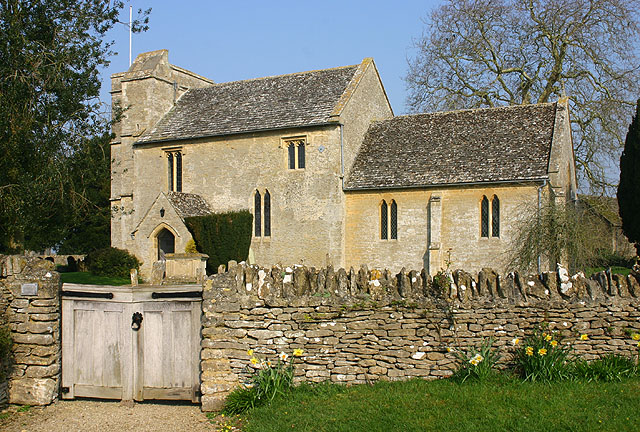
- St. George's parish church

- Location within Oxfordshire
- Population: 101 (2011 Census)
- OS grid reference: SP253048
- Civil parish: Kencot
- District: West Oxfordshire
- Shire county: Oxfordshire
- Region: South East
- Country: England
- Sovereign state: United Kingdom
- Post town: Lechlade
- Postcode district: GL7
- Dialling code: 01367
- Police: Thames Valley
- Fire: Oxfordshire
- Ambulance: South Central
- UK Parliament: Witney

Kencot is a village and civil parish about 2 miles (3 km) south-west of Carterton in West Oxfordshire. The 2011 Census recorded the parish's population as 101.

== Archaeology ==
A Neolithic stone hand axe was found at Kencot. Petrological analysis in 1940 identified the stone as epidotised tuff from Stake Pass in the Lake District, 230 miles (370 km) to the north. Stone axes from the same source have been found at Alvescot, Abingdon, Sutton Courtenay and Minster Lovell.

== Parish church ==
The Church of England parish church of Saint George is Norman. Features from this period include the south doorway, whose tympanum contains a relief of Sagittarius shooting a monster, and a former doorway in the north wall. The openings of the chancel windows are 13th century but the windows themselves are modern. The ground stage of the bell tower was built in about 1300 and the present chancel arch was built early in the 14th century. High in the south wall of the nave are two Perpendicular Gothic windows, and the late Perpendicular upper stages of the tower were completed in about 1500. St George's is a Grade II* listed building. The parish is now part of the Benefice of Shill Valley and Broadshire.

== Economic and social history ==
Red Rose Close was built in the 17th century, in 1650 according to its date-stone. Manor Farm house was built in the 17th century and altered in the 18th century. Kencot House is a house of seven bays built early in the 18th century. Much of the village is within a conservation area. As well as the church it has a number of other Grade II listed buildings and other structures (including the telephone kiosk and war memorial).

== RAF Broadwell ==
RAF Broadwell was built in 1943 on land in the parish 1 mile (1.6 km) north of the village. The airfield was in service until 1947 and was used by Royal Air Force Transport Command.

== Sources and further reading ==
- Fisher, A.S.T. (1970). The History of Kencot, Oxfordshire. privately published.
- Harden, D.B. (1940). "The Geological Origin of Four Stone Axes Found in the Oxford District" (PDF). Oxoniensia. V. Oxford Architectural and Historical Society: 165.
- Sherwood, Jennifer; Pevsner, Nikolaus (1974). Oxfordshire. The Buildings of England. Harmondsworth: Penguin Books. pp. 667–668. ISBN 0-14-071045-0.
- Townley, Simon C. (ed.); Colvin, Christina; Cragoe, Carol; Ortenberg, Veronica; Peberdy, R.B.; Selwyn, Nesta; Williamson, Elizabeth (2006). A History of the County of Oxford. Victoria County History. Vol. 15: Carterton, Minster Lovell and Environs: Bampton Hundred (Part Three). Woodbridge: Boydell & Brewer for the Institute of Historical Research. pp. 147–177. ISBN 978-1-90435-606-6.
- Zeuner, F.E. (1952). "A group VI neolithic axe from Minster Lovell, Oxfordshire". Proceedings of the Prehistoric Society. XVIII (2). Cambridge University Press for The Prehistoric Society: 240–241. ISSN 0958-8418.
