= Carterton railway station (England) =

Disused railway station in England

Carterton
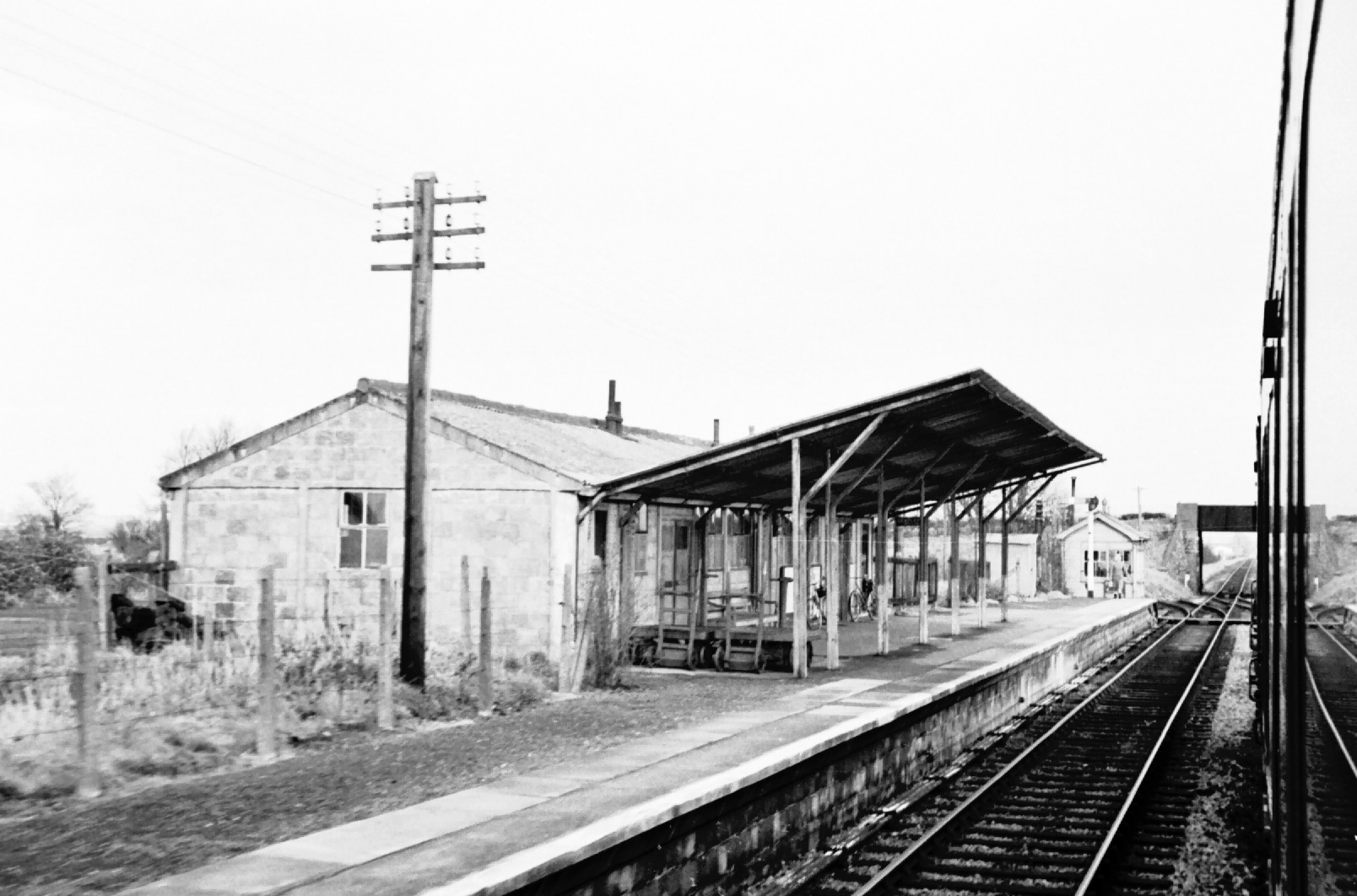
- January 1962

General information
- Location: Carterton, West Oxfordshire; England
- Coordinates: 51.74104°N 1.58766°W
- Grid reference: SP286048
- Platforms: 2

Other information
- Status: Disused

History
- Original company: Great Western Railway
- Post-grouping: Great Western Railway

Key dates
- 2 October 1944: Opened
- 18 June 1962: Closed
Location

Carterton railway station was a railway station that served the town of Carterton in Oxfordshire on the Oxford, Witney and Fairford Railway between Oxford and Fairford. The station had two stone-built platforms, a passing loop, and a concrete station building.

== History ==
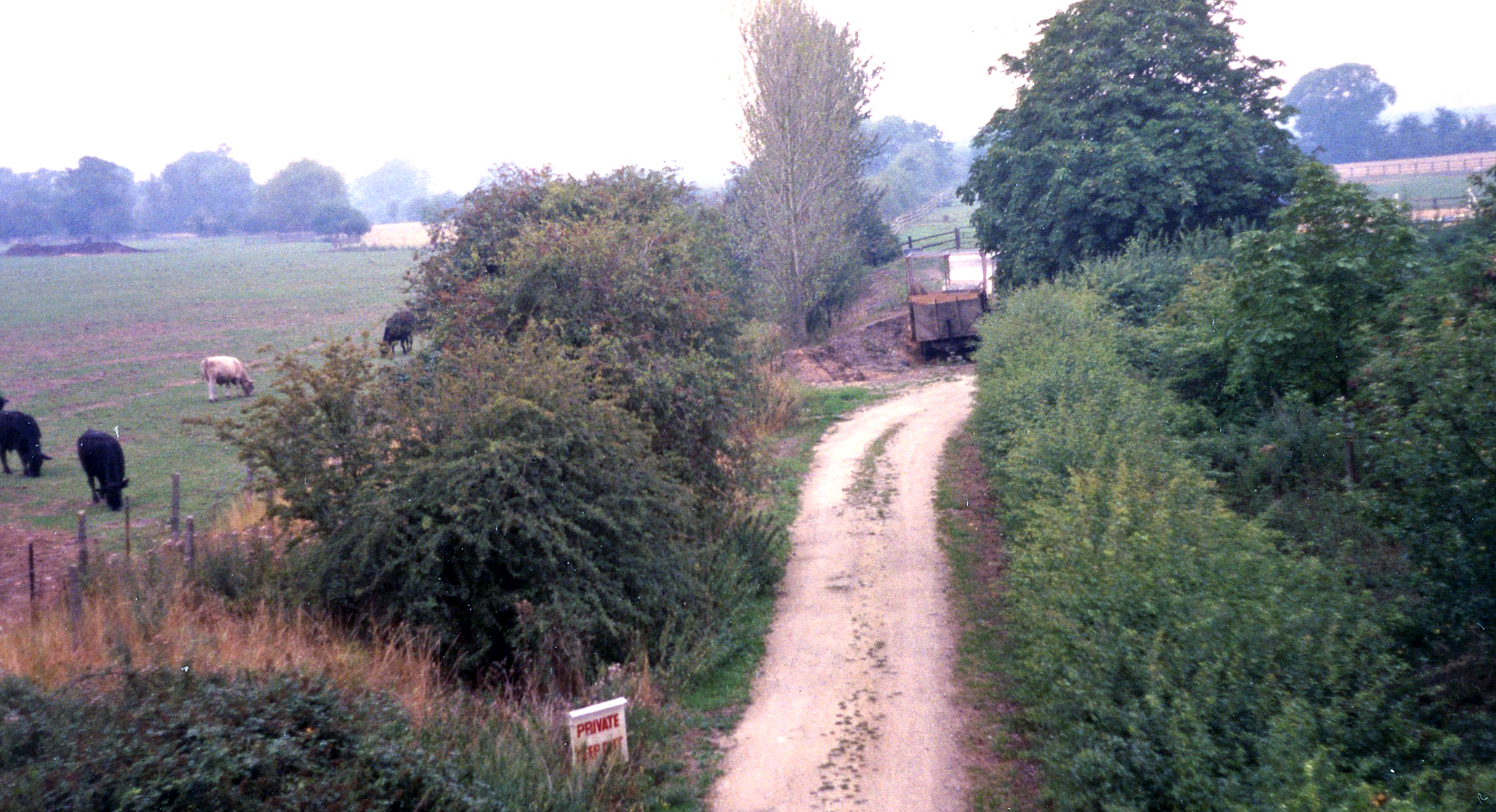
Station site in 1990

Built next to the Carterton to Black Bourton road less than two miles from Brize Norton and Bampton railway station, the station was opened on 2 October 1944, to serve RAF Brize Norton which had opened in August 1937. It had initially been considered to name the station "Black Bourton".

Construction of the station had begun in May 1944 when a siding was laid on the Down side which, three months later, was adapted as a passing loop opened on 10 August, 18 chains (360 m) in length and fully signalled for passenger services. The station had platforms on the Up and Down lines; an austere War Department-type structure resembling an RAF hut, stood on the Up side. The front of the building was sheltered by a makeshift asbestos canopy and a traditional timber signal box stood just beyond the end of the Up platform. A very basic corrugated iron shelter was provided on the Down platform. No goods facilities were provided as Brize Norton and Bampton station lay within close proximity 1 mile 32 chains (2.3 km) to the east, although agricultural produce from smallholdings in Carterton were often dispatched by passenger train.

The position of the line in relation to the airfield meant that when its facilities were extended southwards, two essential taxiways crossed the railway line necessitating wide level crossing gates to span the entire width. After the war, the airfields continued to generate significant traffic until the early 1950s when Brize Norton became a USAF base and traffic suddenly fell away. By June 1958 there was only one daily freight service on the line: a morning working from Carterton to Oxford.

The station closed along with the East Gloucestershire Railway from Witney to Fairford on 18 June 1962.

Preceding station	Disused railways	Following station
Alvescot; Line and station closed	Great Western Railway; East Gloucestershire Railway	Brize Norton and Bampton; Line and station closed

== Present day ==
The line between Carterton and Brize Norton and Bampton has been severed as a result of the southward expansion of RAF Brize Norton. The station building has survived, the only one to do so on the East Gloucestershire Railway, and was used for some time as a pig farm, then storage of farm machinery. It was reclad in timber in 1980 and is now used as stabling.

The station site may be identified by reference to the roadbridge which carries the Black Bourton road over the disused railway. The trackbed towards Fairford has become a rural track used by the local farmer.

== Future ==
The station has been proposed for reopening on a site more centrally located to the north of the town, although a number of other options have also been suggested. This is part of a wider project to restore the railway to Carterton via Witney and Eynsham.
