= Alvescot =

Village in Oxfordshire, England

Coordinates: 51.742°N 1.591°W

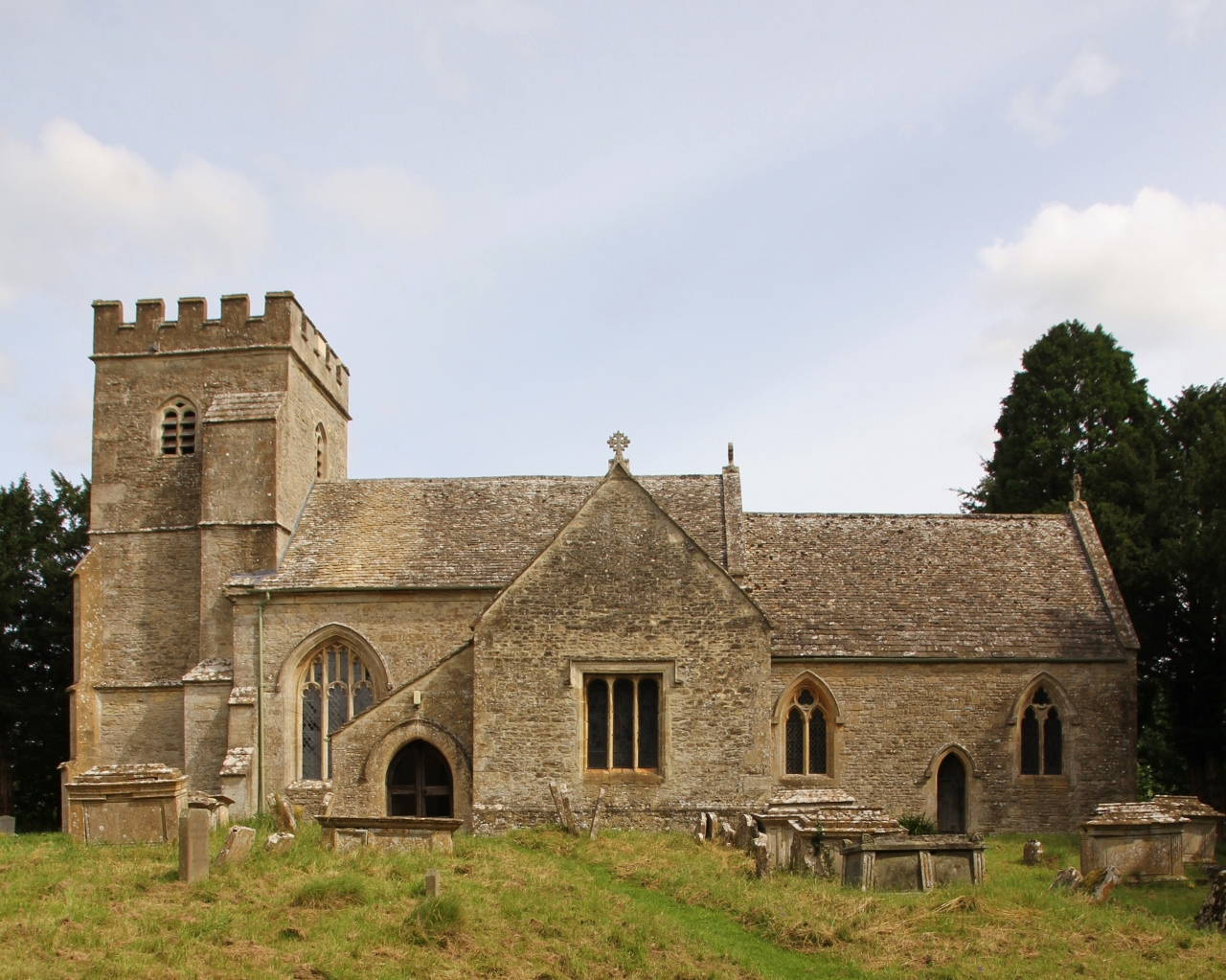
- St Peter's parish church

- Location within Oxfordshire
- Population: 472 (2011 Census)
- OS grid reference: SP2704
- Civil parish: Alvescot
- District: West Oxfordshire
- Shire county: Oxfordshire
- Region: South East
- Country: England
- Sovereign state: United Kingdom
- Post town: Bampton
- Postcode district: OX18
- Dialling code: 01993
- Police: Thames Valley
- Fire: Oxfordshire
- Ambulance: South Central
- UK Parliament: Witney
- Website: Alvescot Parish Council

Alvescot is a village and civil parish about 1 1/2 miles (2.4 km) south of Carterton, Oxfordshire, England. The 2011 Census recorded the parish's population as 472.

== Archaeology ==
A Neolithic stone hand axe was found at Alvescot. Petrological analysis in 1940 identified the stone as epidotised tuff from Stake Pass in the Lake District, 230 miles (370 km) to the north. Stone axes from the same source have been found at Kencot, Abingdon, Sutton Courtenay and Minster Lovell.

== Church and chapel ==
=== Church of England ===
The Church of England parish church of Saint Peter is cruciform. The font is Norman and 12th- or 13th-century. The north transept and blocked north doorway are early 13th-century. The hoodmould over the south doorway is either late 13th- or early 14th-century, and the south porch was added in the 14th century. In the 15th century the nave was rebuilt and the present Perpendicular Gothic south transept and west tower were built. In the 16th century the south wall of the south transept was rebuilt and the present piscina in the south transept was inserted. St Peter's was restored in 1872 under the direction of the architects William Slater and Richard Carpenter. It is a Grade II* listed building.

The west tower has a ring of six bells. Abraham II Rudhall of Gloucester cast the tenor, second and fifth bells in 1727. Robert and James Wells of Aldbourne, Wiltshire cast the fourth bell in 1796. George Mears of the Whitechapel Bell Foundry cast the third bell in 1859. The Whitechapel Bell Foundry also cast the treble bell in 1985. St Peter's parish is now part of the Benefice of Shill Valley and Broadshire.

=== Baptist ===
Alvescot used to have a Baptist congregation. Its former chapel is now a private house. There was also a Methodist congregation, but its chapel was demolished in the 1990s.

== Economic and social history ==
In 1873 the East Gloucestershire Railway between Fairford and Witney was opened. It provided Alvescot railway station just outside the village on the road to Black Bourton. The Great Western Railway took over the line in 1890 and British Railways closed it in 1962.

== Amenities ==
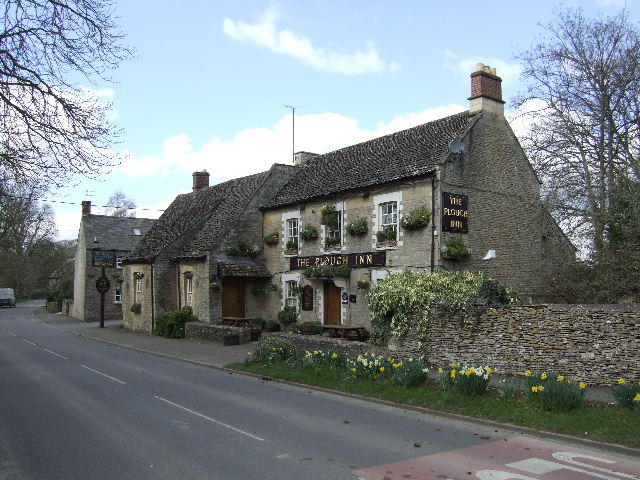
The Plough Inn

Alvescot has a public house, the Plough Inn, and a Church of England infants' school.

== Sources and further reading ==
- Harden, D.B. (1940). "The Geological Origin of Four Stone Axes Found in the Oxford District" (PDF). Oxoniensia. V. Oxford Architectural and Historical Society: 165. ISSN 0308-5562.
- Sherwood, Jennifer; Pevsner, Nikolaus (1974). Oxfordshire. The Buildings of England. Harmondsworth: Penguin Books. pp. 421–422. ISBN 0-14-071045-0.
- Colvin, Christina; Cragoe, Carol; Ortenberg, Veronica; Peberdy, R.B.; Selwyn, Nesta; Williamson, Elizabeth (2006). Townley, Simon C. (ed.). A History of the County of Oxford. Victoria County History. Vol. 15: Carterton, Minster Lovell and Environs: Bampton Hundred (Part Three). Woodbridge: Boydell & Brewer for the Institute of Historical Research. pp. 8–37. ISBN 978-1-90435-606-6.
- Zeuner, F.E. (1952). "A group VI neolithic axe from Minster Lovell, Oxfordshire". Proceedings of the Prehistoric Society. XVIII (2). Cambridge University Press for The Prehistoric Society: 240–241. ISSN 0958-8418.
