= Alvescot railway station =

Disused railway station in Alvescot, Oxfordshire

Alvescot
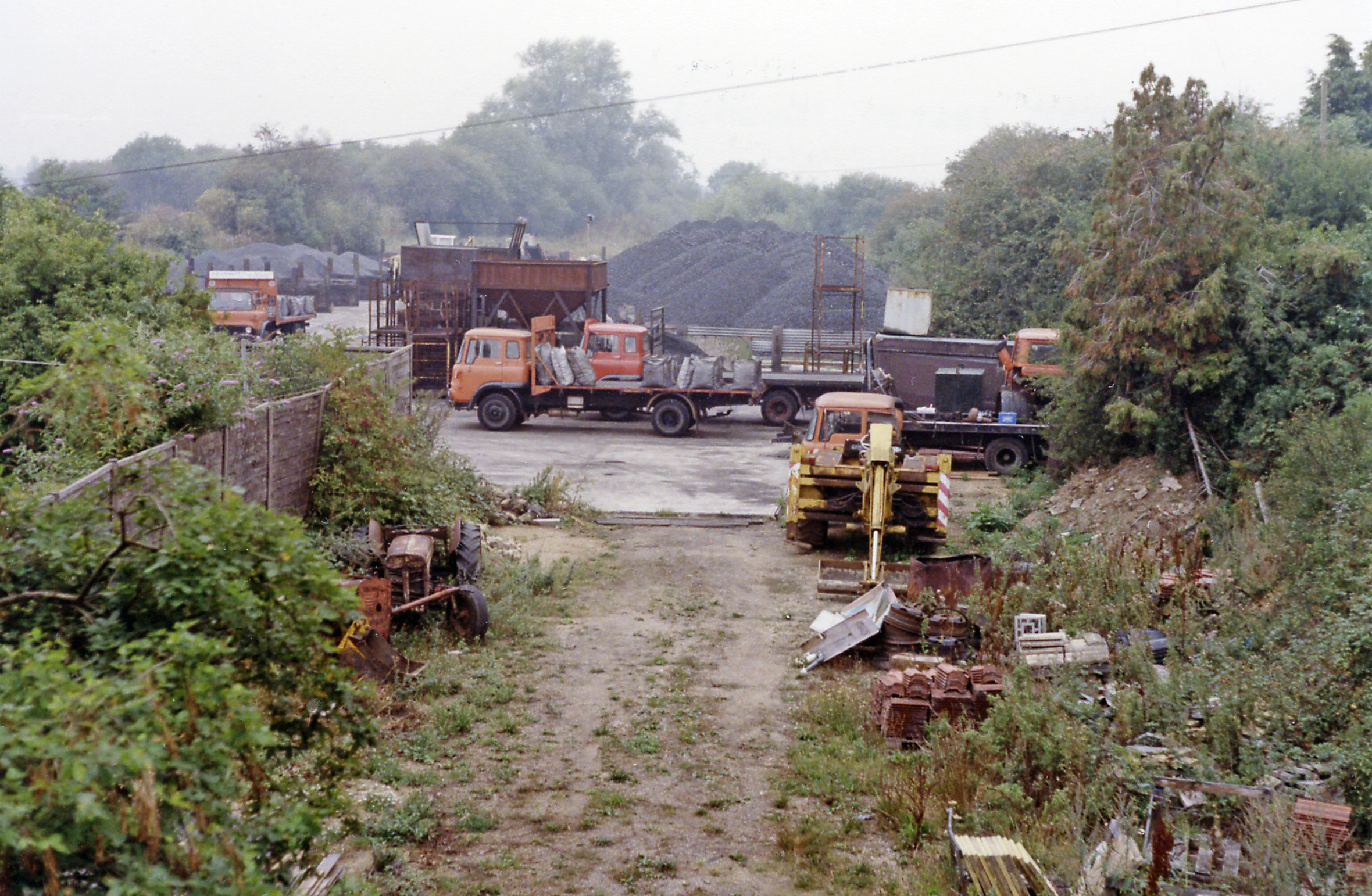
- Station site in 1990.

General information
- Location: Alvescot, West Oxfordshire; England
- Coordinates: 51.73561°N 1.60034°W
- Grid reference: SP277041
- Platforms: 1

Other information
- Status: Disused

History
- Original company: East Gloucestershire Railway
- Pre-grouping: Great Western Railway
- Post-grouping: Great Western Railway

Key dates
- 15 January 1873: Station opens
- 18 June 1962: Station closes
Location

Alvescot railway station was a railway station between the Oxfordshire villages of Alvescot and Black Bourton, in England. It was Oxford, Witney and Fairford Railway between Oxford and Fairford.

== History ==
The station was opened by the East Gloucestershire Railway on 15 January 1873 as part of its 14-mile-10-chain (22.7 km) extension of the Witney Railway from Witney to Fairford. Situated on the Alvescot-Clanfield road, the station served the village of Alvescot, situated less than 1/2 mile (0.8 km) to the north, and also the neighbouring village of Black Bourton.

A small single-platform station was provided without a passing loop or signal box. Ground frames controlled the access to the two goods sidings which trailed off the single track line at the western end of the platform to serve coal staithes, cattle pens and a goods shed. A single refuge siding on the Down side lay just beyond the western end of the station. Next to the station building was a Great Western Railway-type Pagoda shed and to the rear of the building, adjacent to the station forecourt, was a goods lock-up and a brick weigh house. Unlike the Cotswold stone stations at Lechlade, Bampton, Fairford and Witney, the station building at Alvescot was constructed of red brick.

In 1923, the station issued 9,046 tickets and handled 424 parcels and 9,616 tons of goods. In 1944, Carterton station was opened 56 chains (1,100 m) to the east of Alverscot. During the "Arctic" winter of 1946-7, the line was severed at Alvescot when a large snow drift blocked the line. An emergency service was maintained with services running from either end of the snow-filled cutting. During the final years before closure, a British Railways employee at Alvescot made a proposal for the line's operation using diesel railcars that, he claimed, would save at least £20,000. This was to no avail as the station was closed along with the East Gloucestershire Railway on 18 June 1962.

Preceding station	Disused railways	Following station
Kelmscott and Langford; Line and station closed	Great Western Railway; East Gloucestershire Railway	Carterton; Line and station closed

== Present day ==
The goods yard remains occupied by G.F. Luckett, coal merchant, now supplied by road. All the station buildings have been demolished and the remainder of the site is a light industrial area. The station house still stands and is called "Station Bungalow". Large sections of trackbed between Alvescot and Kelmscott and Langford remain intact.
