= Witney =

Town in West Oxfordshire, England

Coordinates: 51.78°N 1.49°W

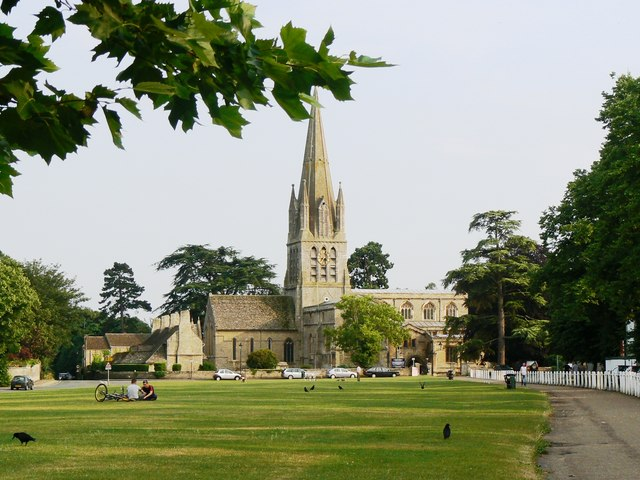
- St Mary the Virgin Church

- Location within Oxfordshire
- Population: 29,632 (2021 Census)
- OS grid reference: SP3509
- Civil parish: Witney
- District: West Oxfordshire
- Shire county: Oxfordshire
- Region: South East
- Country: England
- Sovereign state: United Kingdom
- Post town: Witney
- Postcode district: OX28
- Dialling code: 01993
- Police: Thames Valley
- Fire: Oxfordshire
- Ambulance: South Central
- UK Parliament: Witney
- Website: Witney Town Council

Witney is a market town on the River Windrush in West Oxfordshire in the county of Oxfordshire, England. It is 12 miles (19 km) west of Oxford.

== History ==
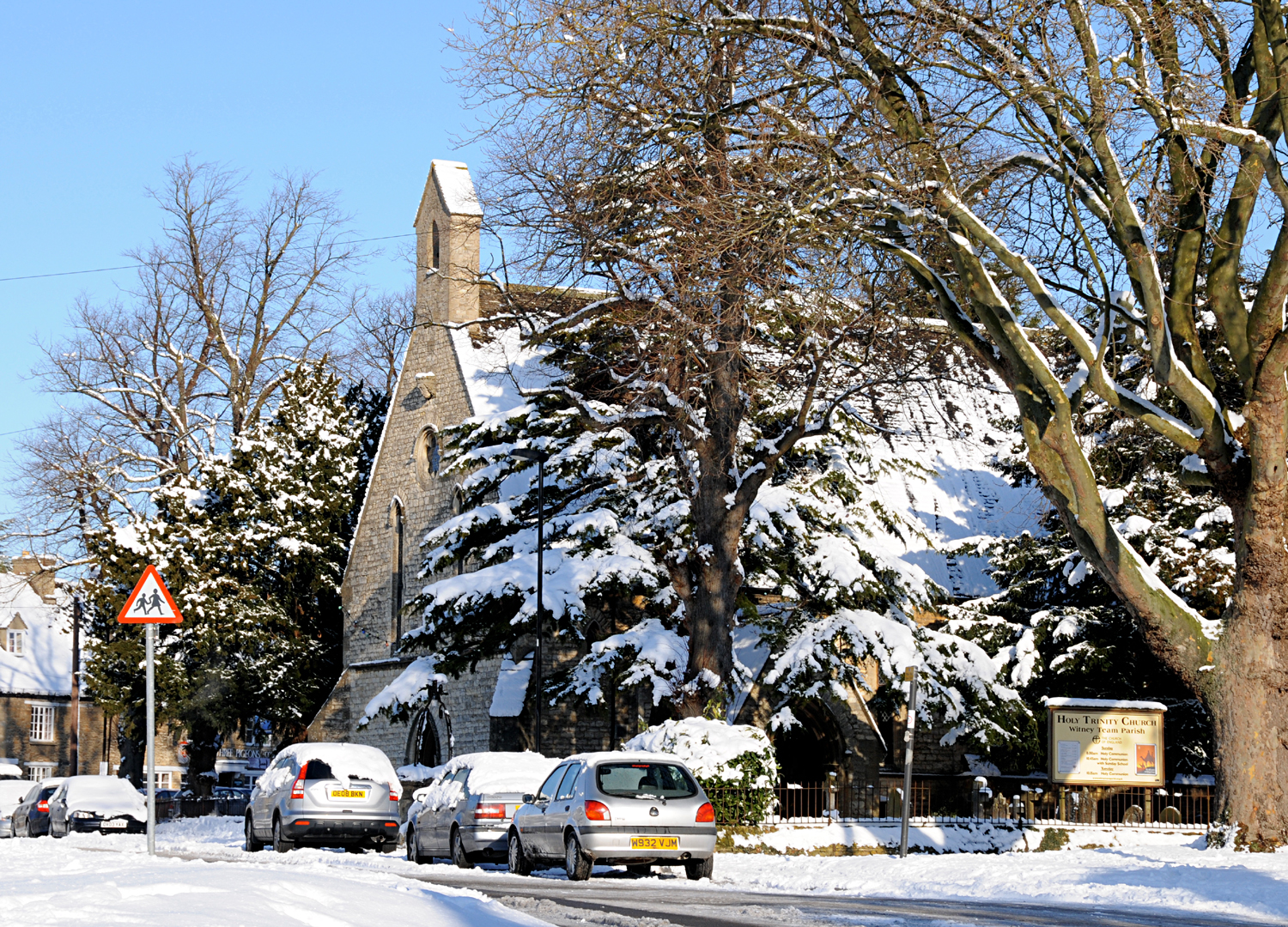
Holy Trinity parish church, Woodgreen

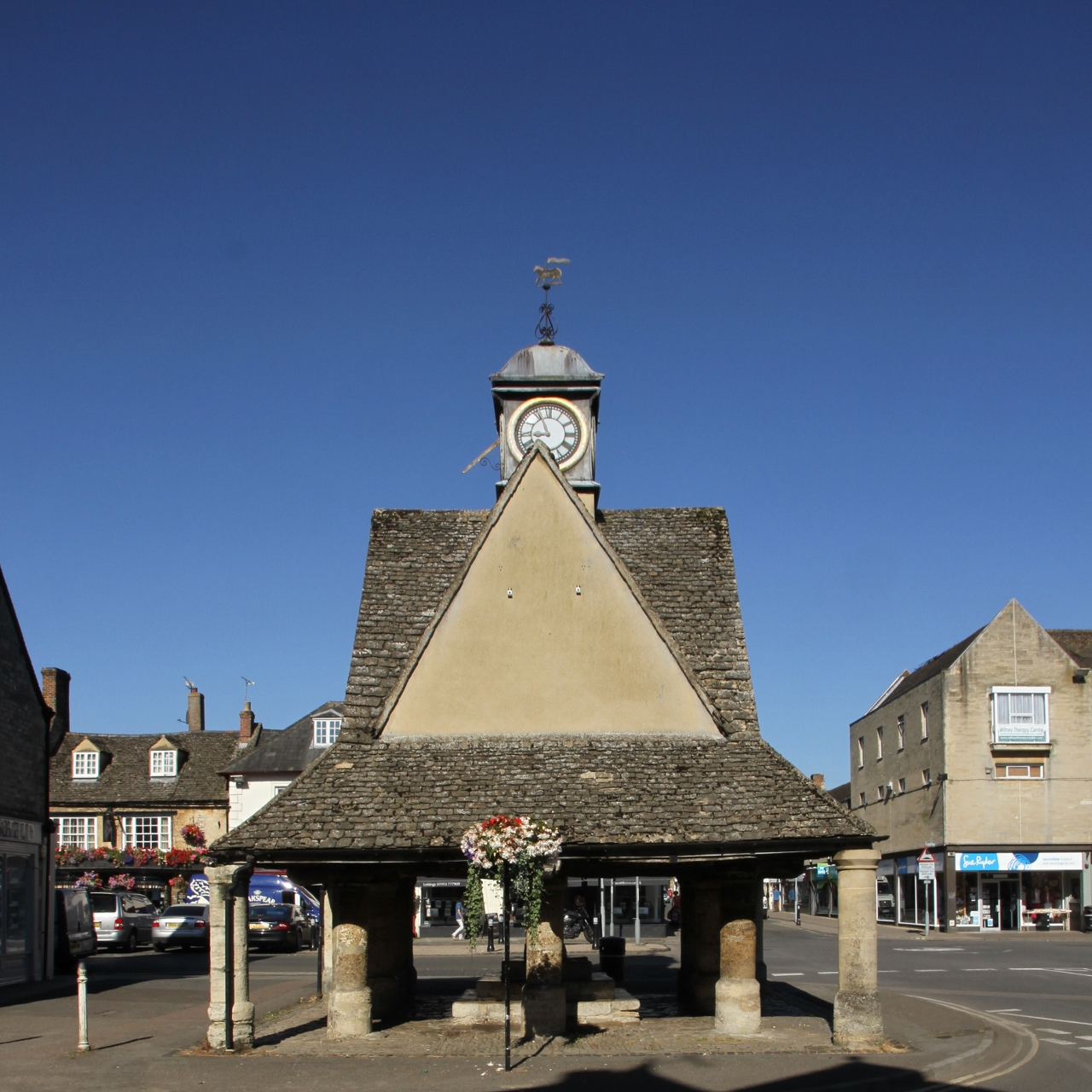
The Butter Cross

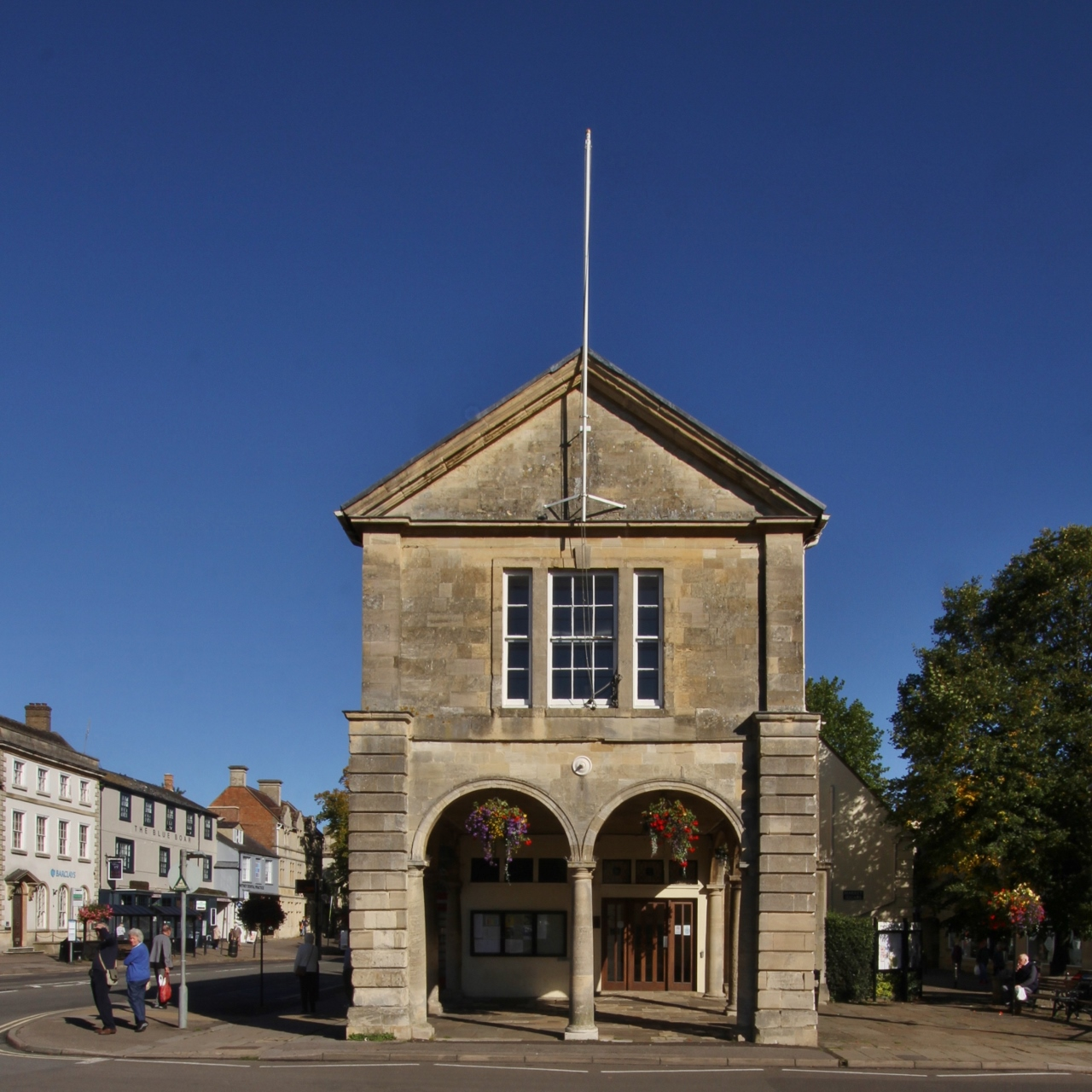
Witney Town Hall

The place-name "Witney" is derived from the Old English for "Witta's island". The earliest known record of it is as Wyttannige in a Saxon charter of 969. The Domesday Book of 1086 records it as Witenie, in the ancient hundred of Bampton.

The Church of England parish church of St Mary the Virgin was originally Norman. The north porch and north aisle were added in this style late in the 12th century, and survived a major rebuilding in about 1243. In this rebuilding the present chancel, transepts, tower and spire were added and the nave was remodelled, all in the Early English style. In the 14th century a number of side chapels and some of the present windows were added in the Decorated style. In the 15th century the south transept was extended and the present west window of the nave were added in the Perpendicular style. The tower has a peal of eight bells. The tower of the church is 69 feet (21 metres) high, topped by a tall and slender spire, which brings the total height of the church to 154 feet (47 metres).

Holy Trinity Church, Wood Green, was built in 1849 in a Gothic Revival rendition of Early English Gothic. St Mary the Virgin and Holy Trinity are now members of a single team parish.

The Friends Meeting House in Wood Green was built in the 18th century. Since 1997 Quakers in Witney have met at the Corn Exchange. The Methodist church in the High Street was built in 1850. It is now one of five Methodist churches and chapels in Witney. The Roman Catholic parish of Our Lady and Saint Hugh was founded in 1913. It originally used a chapel in West End built in 1881 but now has its own modern building. The old chapel in West End is now Elim Christian Fellowship. Witney High Street still has several older buildings, which are protected by the Witney and Cogges conservation area.

Witney Market began in the Middle Ages. Thursday is the traditional market day but there is also a market on Saturday. The buttercross in the market square is so called because people from neighbouring towns would gather there to buy butter and eggs. It was built in about 1600 and its clock was added in 1683. Witney Town Hall, which is arcaded on the ground floor and has an assembly room on the first floor, was completed in 1786. Witney has long been an important crossing over the River Windrush. The architect Thomas Wyatt rebuilt the bridge in Bridge Street in 1822.

Witney workhouse was on Razor Hill (now Tower Hill). It was designed by the architect George Wilkinson and built in 1835–36. It had four wings radiating from an octagonal central building, similar to the Chipping Norton workhouse, which also was built by Wilkinson. His younger brother William Wilkinson added a separate chapel to Witney Workhouse in 1860. In the First World War the workhouse held prisoners of war. In 1940 the workhouse was converted into Crawford Collets engineering factory under the direction of Leonard Frank Eve. The chapel was made the factory canteen. In 1979 Crawford Collets had the main buildings demolished and replaced with a modern factory, but preserved the entrance gate and former chapel. In 2004 the modern factory was demolished for redevelopment. The gate and chapel have again been preserved and the former chapel converted into offices.

== Governance ==
There are three tiers of local government covering Witney, at civil parish (town), district, and county level: Witney Town Council, West Oxfordshire District Council, and Oxfordshire County Council. The town council has its offices at Witney Town Hall and meets at the Corn Exchange. West Oxfordshire District Council is also based in the town, having its main offices on Woodgreen.

=== Constituency ===
The town forms part of the Witney constituency, represented by Charlie Maynard, a Liberal Democrat, since 2024. Former foreign secretary Douglas Hurd and former leader of the Conservatives and Prime Minister David Cameron were both MPs for Witney. In the 1997 General Election, Shaun Woodward stood and won the seat as a Conservative, after Hurd retired. Woodward switched to the Labour Party in 1999. In the 2001 General Election Woodward stood as the Labour candidate in the St Helens South constituency, and David Cameron retook Witney for the Conservatives. He became Prime Minister in coalition with the Liberal Democrats in May 2010 and continued after the 2015 election, in which the Conservative Party gained a majority, but retired to the backbenches after the referendum that rejected his government's recommendation to remain in the European Union. He stood down as an MP soon afterwards, triggering a by-election held on 20 October 2016, in which Robert Courts was elected for the Conservatives. Courts was re-elected in 2017 and 2019, before being defeated by Maynard in 2024.

=== Administrative history ===
Witney was an ancient parish in the Bampton hundred of Oxfordshire. The parish was divided into four townships, being Crawley, Curbridge, Hailey, and a Witney township covering the central part of the parish including the town itself. Such townships all became civil parishes in 1866.

The Witney township was made a local government district in 1863. Such local government districts were reconstituted as urban districts under the Local Government Act 1894.

Witney Urban District was abolished in 1974 under the Local Government Act 1972. District-level functions passed to the new West Oxfordshire District Council. A successor parish called Witney was created covering the area of the abolished urban district, with its parish council taking the name Witney Town Council.

== Industry ==
Witney has been famous for its woollen blankets since the Middle Ages. The water for the production of these blankets is drawn from the River Windrush, which was believed to be the secret of Witney's high-quality blankets. The cloth industry dominated life in Witney where one 17th-century observer noted that "almost 3,000 people from 8 years old to old age worked" in the manufacture of blankets. Mops were also traditionally made by the blanket manufacturers; at one time every ship in the Royal Navy had Witney mops aboard. The Blanket Hall in High Street was built in 1721 for weighing and measuring blankets. At one time there were five blanket factories in the town but with the closure of the largest blanket maker Early's, in 2002, the town's blanket industry completely ceased production. Early's factory, once a vital and important part of the town's history, has now been demolished, and is the site of several new housing estates.

One of the oldest mill sites in the town, New Mill, where there has been a mill since the Domesday Book, now houses the head office of Audley Travel.

For many years Witney had its own brewery and maltings: J.W. Clinch and Co, which founded the Eagle Maltings in 1841. In 1961, Courage bought Clinch's for its pub estate and closed down the brewery. Paddy Glenny founded the Glenny Brewery at the former Clinch's site in 1983, but it was renamed to Wychwood Brewery in 1990. Wychwood brewed real ales, including Hobgoblin, its flagship brand. Refresh UK, a subsidiary of Marston's Brewery, took over the brewery in 2002, and Marston's bought Refresh UK and Wychwood Brewery outright in 2008. Marston's brewing operations, including Wychwood Brewery, were merged into Carlsberg Marston’s Brewing Company in 2020, and Wychwood Brewery was shut down in November 2023, its brands continuing to be brewed elsewhere in the CMBC network.

== Railways ==
The Witney Railway opened Witney's first station in 1861, linking the town to Yarnton where the line joined the Oxford, Worcester and Wolverhampton Railway. In 1873 the East Gloucestershire Railway opened from a new station, linking Witney with Lechlade and Fairford. The Great Western Railway operated services on both lines and eventually took them over. In 1962 British Railways closed the EGR completely and withdrew passenger services from the Witney Railway. In 1970 British Railways closed the Witney Railway completely and it was dismantled.

=== Reopening proposal ===
In 2015 Witney Oxford Transport Group (WOT) proposed the reopening of the railway, with a station at Witney, as an alternative to improvements to the A40 road proposed by Oxfordshire County Council. In 2016 WOT and West Oxfordshire Green Party cited chronic traffic congestion on roads linking Witney with Oxford as a reason to reopen the railway. In 2021 WOT Group submitted a bid to the Department for Transport's 'Restoring Your Railway' Ideas Fund for a grant to develop the case for a new railway in the A40 corridor 'Building a better-connected West Oxfordshire, transforming the wider Oxford economic region' as part of an Oxford Metro advocated by Railfuture.

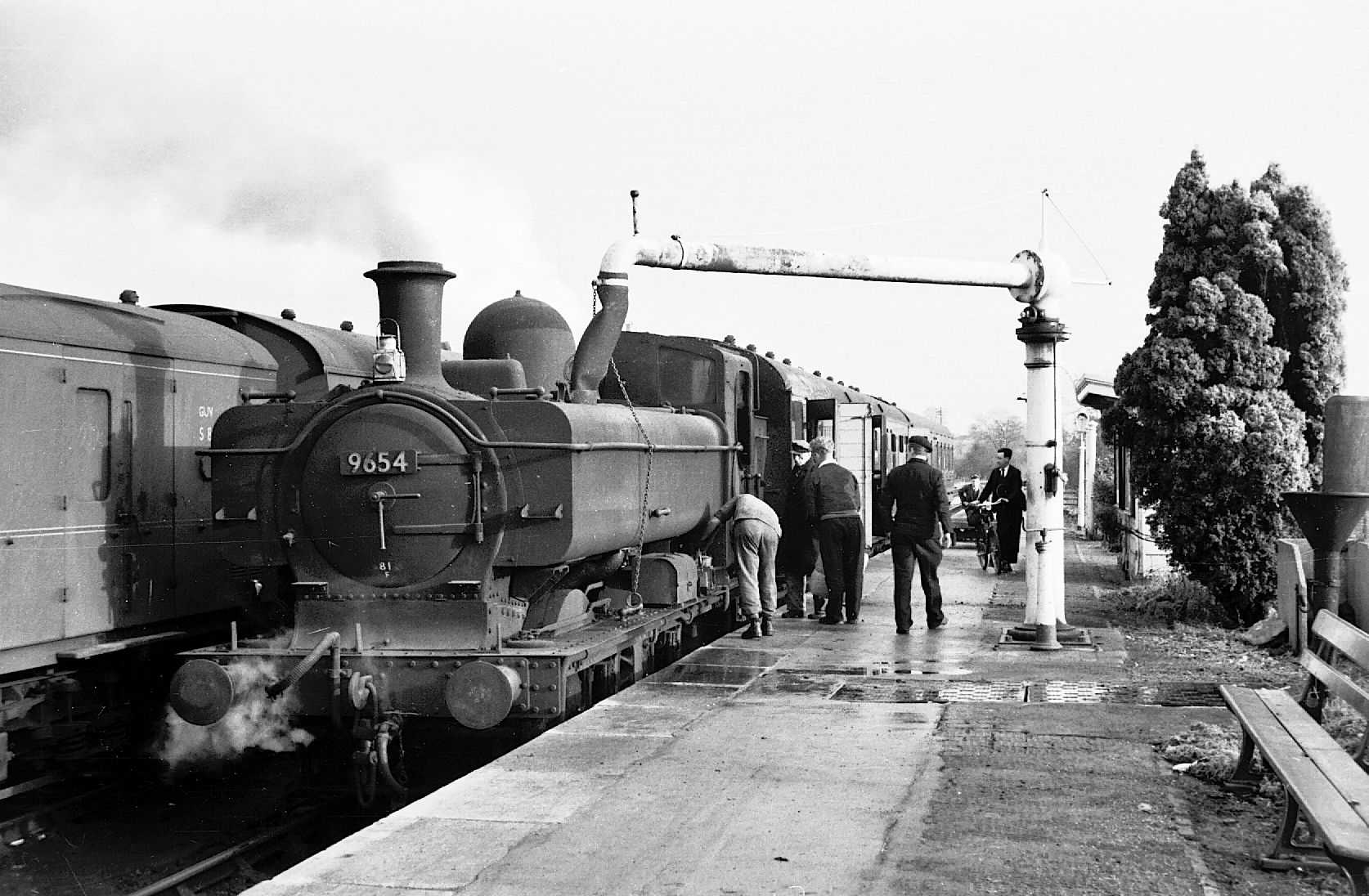
Witney railway station in 1962

== Museums ==
Witney has three museums. Cogges Manor Farm Museum, in the 13th-century manor house and farm of Cogges, represents farming and countryside history. Witney and District Museum has many artefacts and documents representing the history of the town. Witney Blanket Hall, built in the 18th century, showcases both the history of the Hall and of Witney's blanket industry and has Witney blankets for sale.

== Education ==
Witney has three county secondary schools: Henry Box School, Wood Green School and Springfield School. In 1660 Henry Box founded Witney Grammar School. In 1968 it became the comprehensive Henry Box School. In 1970 new school buildings were added to the original 17th-century premises beside Church Green. Wood Green School was founded in 1954 and is at the top of Woodstock Road. Springfield School was founded in 1967 and is a special-needs school for pupils with severe learning difficulties. Springfield School senior section is a self-contained unit, with some shared facilities, within the grounds of Wood Green School. Wood Green was substantially expanded from 2000 to 2004; an additional block with 15 teaching rooms was added, together with a purpose-built sixth form centre, school restaurant and new AstroTurf pitch. 2009 saw part of the old Lower School being remodelled to provide new changing and shower facilities for the AstroTurf pitch and its many users from local community sports clubs.

The King's School is independent of Oxfordshire Local Education Authority. It was founded by Oxfordshire Community Churches, an evangelical Christian organisation, in 1984. Cokethorpe School is an independent secondary school, founded in 1957. St. Mary's School beside Church Green was established in 1813. It was a Church of England primary school but in 1953 it became a Church of England controlled School for Infant children, and the Junior children transferred to the Batt School premises. Witney now has two Church of England primary schools: The Batt School in Corn Street and The Blake School in Cogges Hill Road. Our Lady of Lourdes Catholic Primary School is a Roman Catholic school founded in 1958.

Witney has five community primary schools: Madley Park Community Primary School, Queen's Dyke Primary School, Tower Hill Community Primary School, West Witney Primary School and Witney Community Primary School. It also has one SEN primary school, Springfield School, which is part of the same school as Springfield secondary School. Springfield school (Primary) shares a building with Madley Brook Primary, but aside from sharing a building, some resources and integration, the schools run independently of one another. The former Witney Technical College is now part of Abingdon and Witney College. A complete rebuilding of its premises began in September 2008.

== Sports ==
Witney United Football Club, formerly known as Witney Town and nicknamed the Blanketmen, played in the Hellenic League Premier Division, until they dissolved in the 2012–2013 season. Witney and District League is a local association football league with about 32 clubs in five divisions. Witney Rugby Football Club first XV plays in the RFU South West 1 East. Wychwood Ladies Hockey Club's first team play in the Trysport Hockey League Division 1; Witney Hockey Club men's first XI plays in the England Hockey Men's Conference East division and its ladies' first XI plays in South Clubs' Women's Hockey League Division 3A. Witney Swifts Cricket Club first XI plays in Oxfordshire Cricket Association Division Three. Witney Wolves Basketball Club plays in the Oxford and Chiltern Basketball League.

The Toleman Group Motorsport racing team was once based in Witney until it was rebranded Benetton Formula in 1986. The team itself stayed in Witney until 1992 when they moved to Enstone eventually being rebranded in 2002 as Renault F1 when the team was purchased by the French Renault car company. The team competed as Renault F1 until 2011, when it was again rebranded this time under the "Lotus Renault GP" name after forging a partnership with the British Lotus Cars company. The subsequent year the team became Lotus F1 after they dropped the Renault name. The team was later re-purchased by Renault in late 2015 to become the Renault Sport F1 Team for 2016.

== Twinning ==
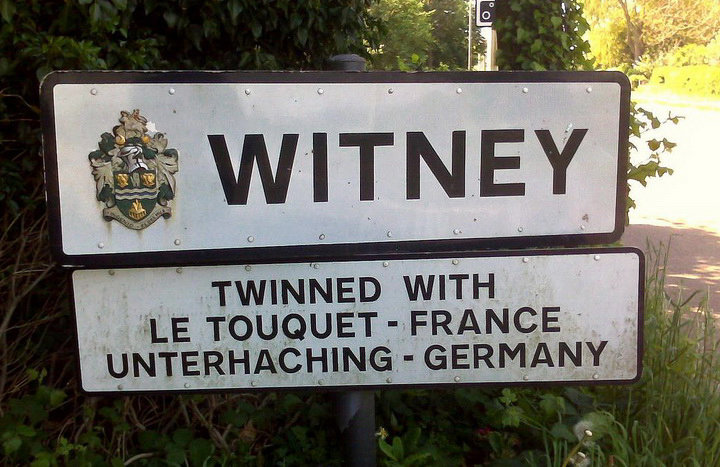
Road sign for Witney

Witney is twinned with:

- Unterhaching, Germany
- Le Touquet, France

== Floods ==
In July 2007 Witney saw its worst flooding in more than 50 years. Homes and businesses were evacuated and Bridge Street, a major road into the town and the only road across the Windrush, was closed. About 200 properties in central Witney were flooded, with areas around Bridge Street, Mill Street and West End the worst affected. The new and incomplete housing development Aquarius also suffered substantial flooding. In 2008 further flooding contributed to the death of a 17-year-old boy who drowned in a culvert.

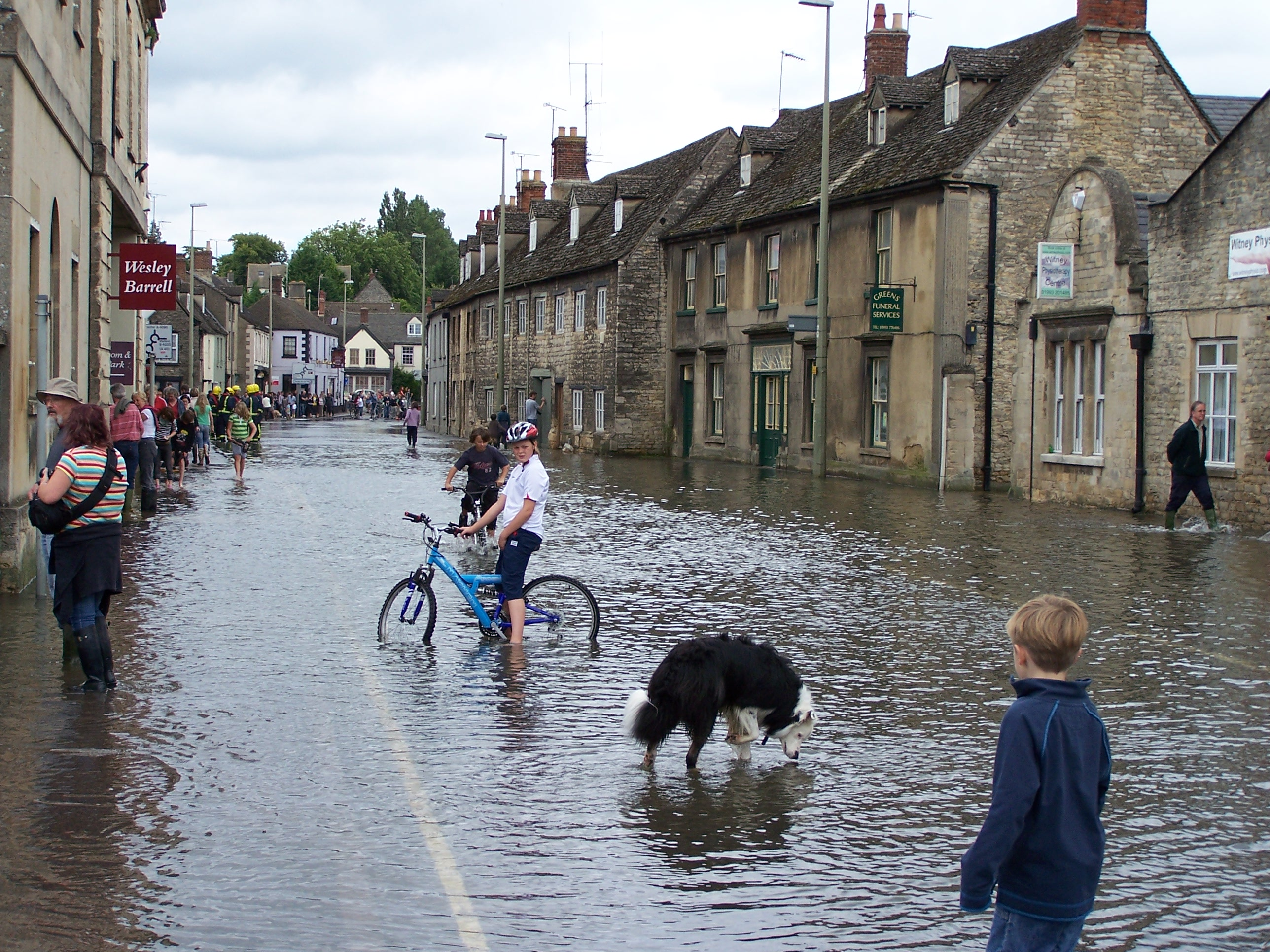
View along Bridge Street, Witney, toward West End when it was flooded, 22 July 2007

== Climate ==
Witney has a maritime climate type typical to the British Isles, with evenly spread rainfall, a narrow temperature range, and comparatively low sunshine totals. The nearest official weather station is Brize Norton, about 4 miles (6.4 km) southwest of Witney. The absolute maximum recorded was 35.4c(95.7f) in August 1990, although in a typical year the warmest day should only reach 29.5c(85.1f) with an average of 14.6 days reporting a maximum temperature of 25.1c(77.2f) or above. The absolute minimum is −20.7c(−5.3f), recorded in January 1982. In a more typical year the annual minimum temperature should be −8.1c(17.4f), although a total of 47.1 nights should report an air frost. Rainfall averages slightly under 644mm per year with more than 1mm of rain falling on just under 115 days of the year.

Climate data for Brize Norton, elevation 88m, 1991–2020, extremes 1901–
Month	Jan	Feb	Mar	Apr	May	Jun	Jul	Aug	Sep	Oct	Nov	Dec	Year
Record high °C (°F)	14.7 (58.5)	18.4 (65.1)	25.0 (77.0)	25.9 (78.6)	32.2 (90.0)	33.5 (92.3)	34.8 (94.6)	35.4 (95.7)	33.4 (92.1)	27.2 (81.0)	18.3 (64.9)	16.1 (61.0)	35.4 (95.7)
Mean daily maximum °C (°F)	7.7 (45.9)	8.3 (46.9)	10.9 (51.6)	13.9 (57.0)	17.1 (62.8)	20.1 (68.2)	22.5 (72.5)	21.9 (71.4)	19.0 (66.2)	14.8 (58.6)	10.6 (51.1)	8.0 (46.4)	14.6 (58.2)
Mean daily minimum °C (°F)	1.7 (35.1)	1.6 (34.9)	3.0 (37.4)	4.8 (40.6)	7.6 (45.7)	10.5 (50.9)	12.6 (54.7)	12.5 (54.5)	10.3 (50.5)	7.5 (45.5)	4.2 (39.6)	2.0 (35.6)	6.5 (43.8)
Record low °C (°F)	−20.7 (−5.3)	−16.1 (3.0)	−11.1 (12.0)	−5.2 (22.6)	−1.7 (28.9)	−0.3 (31.5)	4.4 (39.9)	2.8 (37.0)	−0.5 (31.1)	−4 (25)	−9.6 (14.7)	−20.5 (−4.9)	−20.7 (−5.3)
Average precipitation mm (inches)	66.2 (2.61)	48.1 (1.89)	46.4 (1.83)	49.2 (1.94)	60.1 (2.37)	49.8 (1.96)	55.1 (2.17)	58.6 (2.31)	54.2 (2.13)	70.9 (2.79)	73.2 (2.88)	74.2 (2.92)	706 (27.8)
Mean monthly sunshine hours	62.6	81.3	123.2	171.9	206.1	209.4	214.7	193.4	151.5	111.6	70.8	55.5	1,652
Source: Met Office

== Media ==
The town receives its television signals from the Oxford TV transmitter.

In May 2010, WitneyTV was launched as a non-profit online broadcaster with a weekly show that features local news and upcoming events within West Oxfordshire for the benefit of the community. An archive of videos featuring local attractions, clubs, organisations and previous shows is also available.

A small-scale music festival, Witney Music festival, is held annually on The Leys Recreation Ground. While mostly hosting smaller local artists and tribute bands, it has previously hosted acts such as EMF, The Farm and N-Trance. Witney has a number of recording studios.

Local radio stations are BBC Radio Oxford on 95.2 FM, Heart South on 102.6 FM, and Greatest Hits Radio South on 106.4 FM. On 30 November 2012 Witney Radio was launched, providing hyper-local news, music and current affairs to the people of Witney and West Oxfordshire. A licence to broadcast on FM radio was granted in April 2016 by the licensing authority Ofcom. On 14 July 2017 Witney Radio began to broadcast on 99.9fm to Witney and West Oxfordshire. The station broadcasts 24 hours a day, 7 days a week with over 30 presenters from the local area. The station also broadcasts online for listeners online via TuneIn.

An Internet radio station, Windrush Radio, was established in 2018. It broadcasts mostly pop and electronic music in the daytime, but has a number of hosts that present specific genres, including a showcase of local artists. Windrush Radio has announced plans to broadcast over DAB radio, and a small-scale radio multiplex license has been submitted to Ofcom.

The local newspapers are the Oxford Times, Oxfordshire Guardian and Witney Gazette.

== Notable people ==
Notable people associated with Witney include:

- Emma Appleton, actress
- David Cameron, former MP for Witney and former Prime Minister of the UK and former Foreign Secretary
- Jamie Cook, footballer
- Alan Dapre, children's TV show writer
- Lawson D'Ath, footballer
- Jorge Grant, footballer
- Darrell Griffin, rugby league footballer
- Douglas Hurd, former MP for Witney and former Home Secretary and Foreign Secretary
- Charlie Hutchison, British communist
- Martin Jones, concert pianist
- Simon King, footballer
- Graham Leonard, 130th Bishop of London
- Rhys Lewis, singer-songwriter
- Andrew Logan, artist
- Anthony Dod Mantle, Academy Award-winning cinematographer
- Gugu Mbatha-Raw, TV and film actress
- Maddie Moate, television presenter and YouTuber
- David Moss, footballer
- Robbie Mustoe, footballer
- Lorraine Pascal, model and TV chef
- Miss Read (Dora Saint), author
- Larry Sanders, Green party councillor
- William Smith, cricketer
- James Allen Shuffrey, watercolour artist
- Leonard Shuffrey, architect and architectural designer
- Patrick Steptoe, pioneer of fertility treatment
- Dan Tomlinson, Labour politician
- Sammy Virji, DJ
- Shaun Woodward, Conservative and then Labour MP for Witney, then Labour MP for St Helens South

== Arms ==
Coat of arms of Witney

Notes
Originally granted to the former Urban District council on 9 September 1955.
Crest
Upon a mount Vert between a crescent and a star Or a paschal lamb Proper.
Escutcheon
Vert on a fess wavy Argent between in chief a sinister glove of the last between two leopards' faces each holding in the mouth a shuttle Or and in base a representation of the Butter Cross at Witney Gold a barrulet wavy Azure.
Motto
Ingenio Floremus

== See also ==
- West Oxfordshire District

== Sources and further reading ==
- Jenkins, Stanley (2013). The Witney & Fairford Branch Through Time. Amberley Publishing. ISBN 978-1-4456-1649-0.
- Jenkins, Stanley (2010). Witney: A History. Phillimore & Co. ISBN 978-1-86077-620-5.
- Monk, William J (1894). History of Witney. Witney: Witney Gazette.
- Sherwood, Jennifer; Pevsner, Nikolaus (1974). Oxfordshire. The Buildings of England. Harmondsworth: Penguin Books. pp. 843–851. ISBN 0-14-071045-0.
- Townley, Simon C.; Baggs, A. P.; Chance, Eleanor; Colvin, Christina; Cooper, Janet; Day, C. J.; Selwyn, Nesta; Williamson, Elizabeth; Yates, Margaret, eds. (2004). A History of the County of Oxford. Victoria County History. Vol. 14: Witney and its Townships: Bampton Hundred (Part Two). Woodbridge: Boydell & Brewer for the Institute of Historical Research. pp. 1–170. ISBN 978-1-904356-25-7.
