= Black Bourton =

Village in Oxfordshire, England

Coordinates: 51.733°N 1.590°W

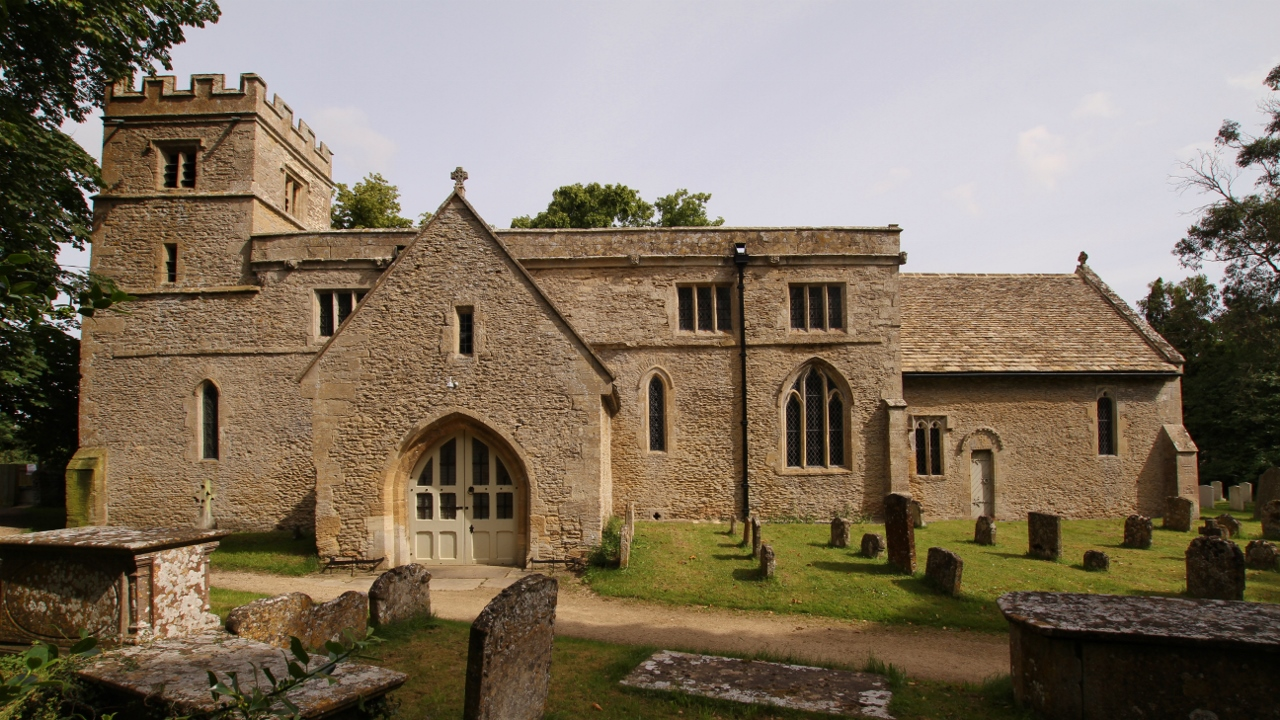
- St Mary the Virgin parish church

- Location within Oxfordshire
- Population: 266 (2011 Census)
- OS grid reference: SP2803
- Civil parish: Black Bourton
- District: West Oxfordshire
- Shire county: Oxfordshire
- Region: South East
- Country: England
- Sovereign state: United Kingdom
- Post town: Bampton
- Postcode district: OX18
- Dialling code: 01993
- Police: Thames Valley
- Fire: Oxfordshire
- Ambulance: South Central
- UK Parliament: Witney
- Website: Black Bourton Parish Council

Black Bourton is a village and civil parish about 2 miles (3 km) south of Carterton, Oxfordshire. The village is on Black Bourton Brook, a tributary of the River Thames. The 2011 Census recorded the parish population as 266. RAF Brize Norton adjoins the parish. The northern boundary of the parish is along the middle of the main runway of the airfield.

== Church and chapel ==
=== Church of England ===
The Church of England parish church of Saint Mary the Virgin was originally built about 1190. The five-bay arcade between the nave and north aisle survives from this time. In the 13th century, the chancel, nave and north aisle were remodelled, and the easternmost bay of the aisle was projected northward to form a north transept. Early English Gothic lancet windows in chancel, nave and north chapel date from this time. The north doorway of the north aisle dates from the 14th century. In the 15th century, the bell tower was built into the nave and the stone pulpit was built. By the end of the 16th century, the north transept had become the memorial chapel of the Hungerford family. Built into the north wall is a substantial stone monument to Eleanor Hungerford (died 1592): a recumbent effigy framed by Corinthian columns. The chapel also includes an English Baroque cartouche to Anthony Hungerford (died 1703) on the west wall. Black stone plaques on the floor record other members of the family. Sir Arthur Hopton, Charles I's ambassador to Spain, is also buried here.

The building was restored under the direction of the architect E.G. Bruton in 1866. During the restoration, a number of late 13th century wall paintings were discovered inside the church. At the time, these were whitewashed over again, but in 1932 they were uncovered again and restored. On the south wall is St Richard of Chichester with, below, the Adoration of the Magi, the Massacre of the Innocents, and the Angel appearing to St Joseph, all with foliage borders. On the north side of the nave over the arcade are paintings of the Tree of Jesse, St Christopher, the martyrdom of St Thomas Becket, the Coronation of the Virgin, the Baptism of Jesus, Saints Peter and Paul and the stoning of Saint Stephen. The church is now a Grade I listed building.

By 1757 the tower had a ring of five bells including the sanctus bell. Henry I Knight of Reading cast three of them including the tenor bell in 1618–19. Henry III Bagley, who had bell-foundries at Chacombe and Witney, cast the third bell in 1743. In 1866 Mears and Stainbank of the Whitechapel Bell Foundry re-cast the second bell, which had long been cracked, and added a new treble bell. The frame is oak, and was made in the late Middle Ages and by 1965 required replacement. In 1966 the tenor bell of 1619 was transferred to the parish church of St John the Evangelist in Carterton. Due to the condition of the frame, the bells remaining at St Mary's were unringable until 2017, when John Taylor & Co of Loughborough restored them and added a new treble bell, increasing the ring of bells to six. St Mary's churchyard includes 32 Commonwealth War Graves Commission burials. There are 30 Second World War burials, one from the First World War and one other. Most of the Second World War graves are of members of the RAF and allied air forces from RAF Brize Norton. The parish is now part of the Benefice of Shill Valley and Broadshire.

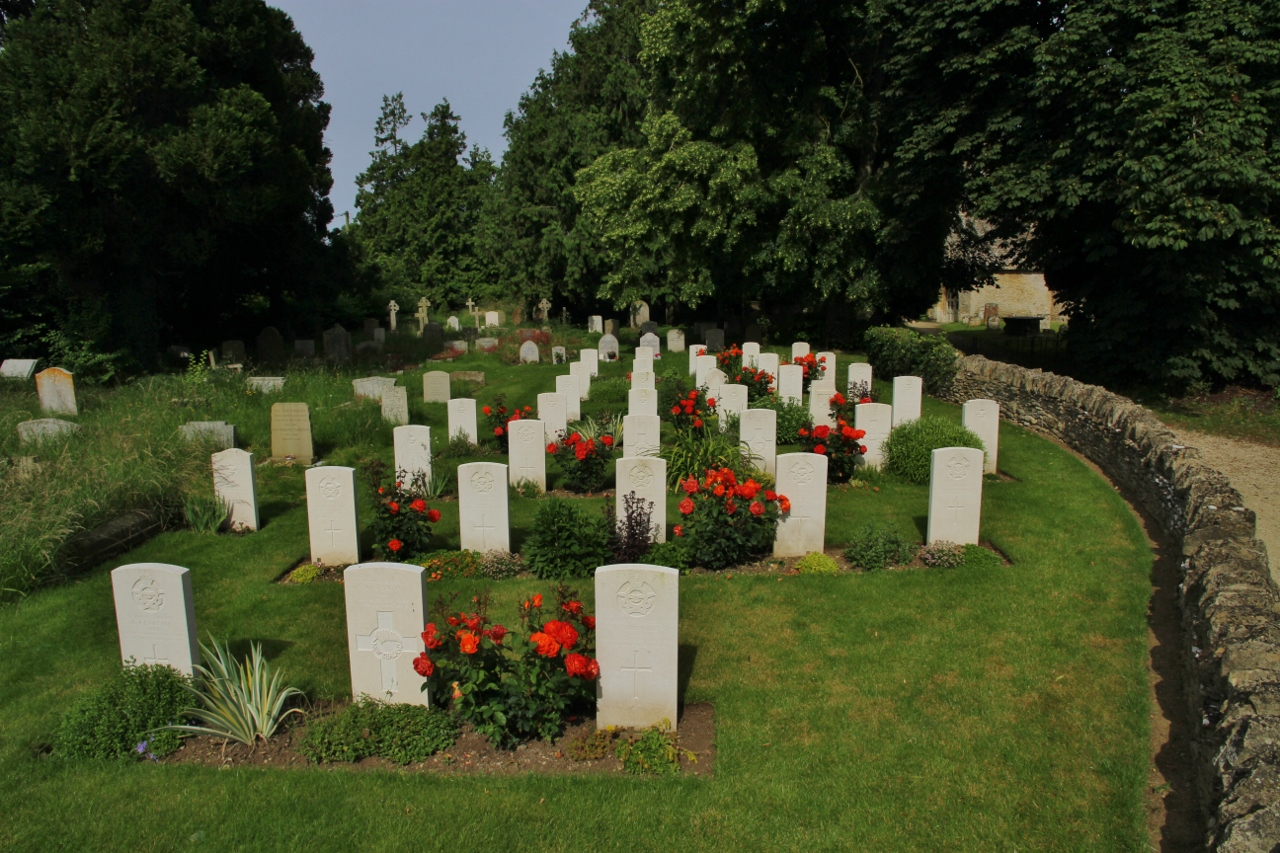
Commonwealth War Graves section of St Mary's parish churchyard

=== Chapel ===
A Primitive Methodist congregation was established in the village in the 19th century and built its own red brick chapel in 1861.

== Social and economic history ==
The influential romantic novelist Maria Edgeworth was born in Black Bourton in 1767. A cul-de-sac in Carterton is named "Edgeworth Drive" after her. The painter William Turner was born in Black Bourton in 1789. Bourton Place was the manor house of the Hungerford family. It was demolished in about 1800. The village school was designed by the architect Sir George Gilbert Scott and built in 1865. In 1873 the East Gloucestershire Railway between Fairford and Witney was opened. It provided Alvescot railway station 1/2 mile (800 m) west of Black Bourton on the road to Alvescot. The Great Western Railway took over the line in 1890 and British Railways closed it in 1962.

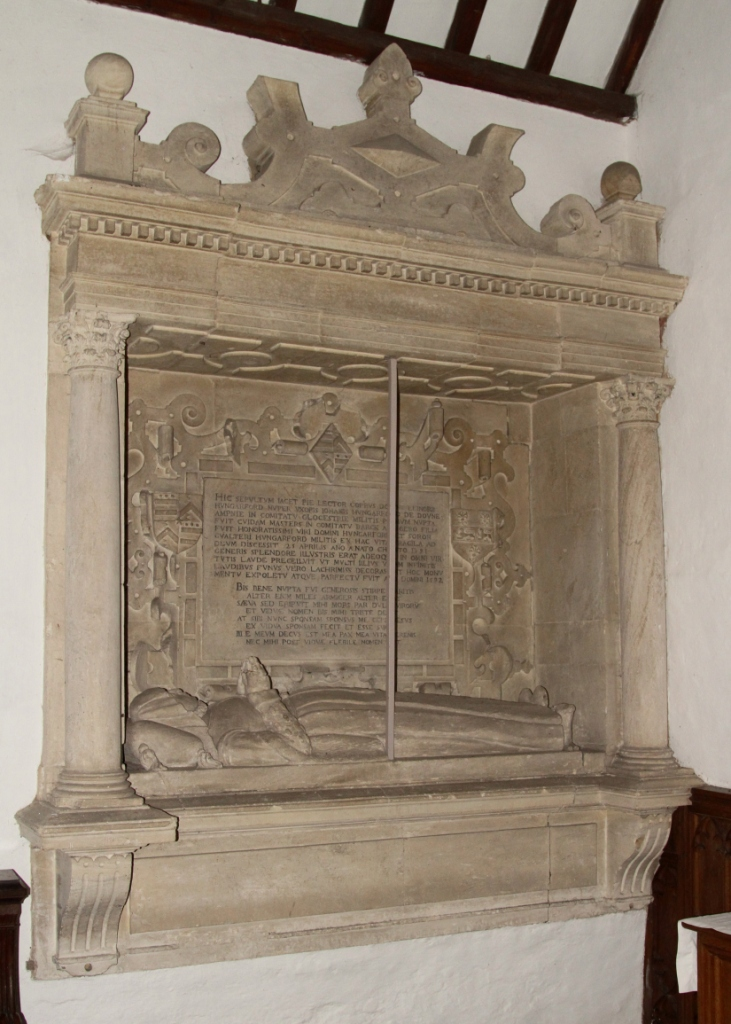
Elizabethan monument in St Mary's parish church for Eleanor Hungerford, who died in 1592

== Air crash ==
Occasionally, aircraft flying to or from RAF Brize Norton have crashed in Black Bourton parish. On 27 August 1944 an Armstrong Whitworth Albemarle ST Mk V of No. 297 Squadron RAF overshot the runway, clipped a tree in Black Bourton and then crashed in a field at Mill Farm. The aircraft caught fire and all five crewmen were killed. In August 2020 a memorial plaque mounted on a small cairn was installed at Mill Farm to commemorate the crew.

== Amenities ==
Black Bourton has a gastropub and hotel, The Vines.

== Sources ==
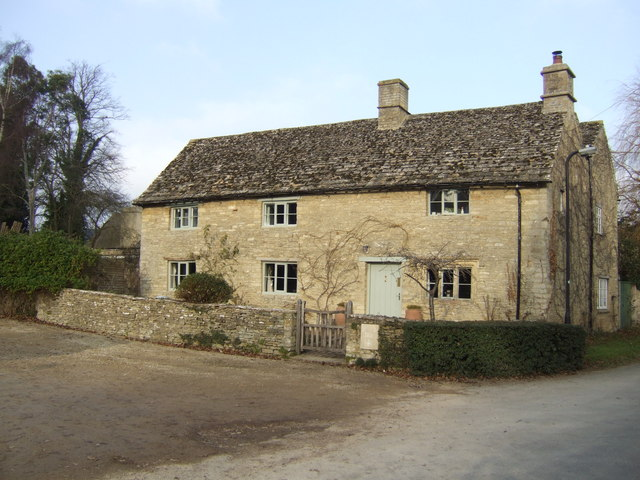
The Old Inn, now a private house

- Gilbert, David; Blinkhorn, Paul (2008). "Excavations West of St Mary's Church, Black Bourton, Oxfordshire: Early, Middle, and Late Anglo-Saxon Activity" (PDF). Oxoniensia. LXXIII. Oxfordshire Architectural and Historical Society: 147–160. ISSN 0308-5562.
- Lupton, Mary. History of the Parish of Black Bourton, Otherwise Called Burton Abbots, in the County of Oxford. Oxford: Oxfordshire Archaeological Society.
- Sherwood, Jennifer; Pevsner, Nikolaus (1974). Oxfordshire. The Buildings of England. Harmondsworth: Penguin Books. pp. 458–459. ISBN 0-14-071045-0.
- Colvin, Christina; Cragoe, Carol; Ortenberg, Veronica; Peberdy, R.B.; Selwyn, Nesta; Williamson, Elizabeth (2006). Townley, Simon C. (ed.). A History of the County of Oxford. Victoria County History. Vol. 15: Carterton, Minster Lovell and Environs: Bampton Hundred (Part Three). Woodbridge: Boydell & Brewer for the Institute of Historical Research. pp. 73–101. ISBN 978-1-90435-606-6.
