= Kelmscott and Langford railway station =

Former railway station in England

Kelmscott and Langford
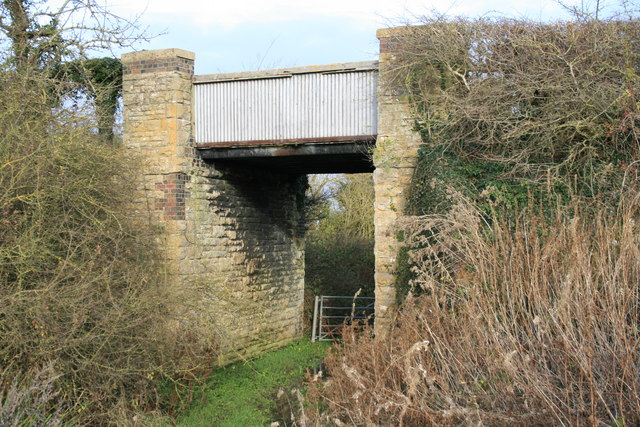
- Road bridge at the eastern end of the station site.

General information
- Location: Langford, West Oxfordshire; England
- Coordinates: 51.71387°N 1.63689°W
- Grid reference: SP253018
- Platforms: 1

Other information
- Status: Disused

History
- Original company: Great Western Railway
- Pre-grouping: Great Western Railway
- Post-grouping: Great Western Railway

Key dates
- 4 November 1907: Station opens
- 18 June 1962: Station closes
Location

Kelmscott and Langford railway station was a railway station in England located south of the village of Langford on the Oxford, Witney and Fairford Railway, between Oxford and Fairford.

== History ==
The station was opened on 4 November 1907 by the Great Western Railway, the only one to be opened on the line during peacetime by the Great Western. It was shown in early timetables as "Kelmscott and Langford Platform", which also appeared in the Official Handbook of Stations until 1949. It was supposed to serve the villages of Langford and Kelmscott but in reality was a considerable distance from both. Langford is 1/2 mile (0.8 km) to the north, and Kelmscott is 1 1/2 miles (2.4 km) to the south.

It was essentially a staffed railway halt with minimal passenger facilities. Situated in rural countryside next to the Langford to Kelmscott road, the station comprised a 300-foot (91 m) long concrete platform and an unusual station building made from two standard corrugated iron Pagoda huts which were bolted together. This was probably the longest building of its type in the country. A single siding operated from the nearby ground frame was brought into use behind the platform for the purpose of loading and unloading cattle traffic and farm machinery on 9 July 1928. No signals, goods shed or crane were provided and the small goods yard was only able to handle cattle and coal class traffic in full wagonloads.

Perhaps owing to its inconvenient location, the station was the least used on the line. Just 3,038 tickets were issued in 1913 and 3,654 in 1923, by some distance the lowest. The station was closed along with the East Gloucestershire Railway on 18 June 1962.

Preceding station	Disused railways	Following station
Lechlade; Line and station closed	Great Western Railway; East Gloucestershire Railway	Alvescot; Line and station closed

== Remnants ==
Traces of the station's platform, lampposts and nameboard posts that remained in September 1987 were entirely cleared by the local farmer except for a pole which once held the station's lighting. Large stretches of the trackbed towards Alvescot remain intact. The station's access road remains in use by the farmer.
