= Witney Town Hall =

Municipal building in Witney, Oxfordshire, England

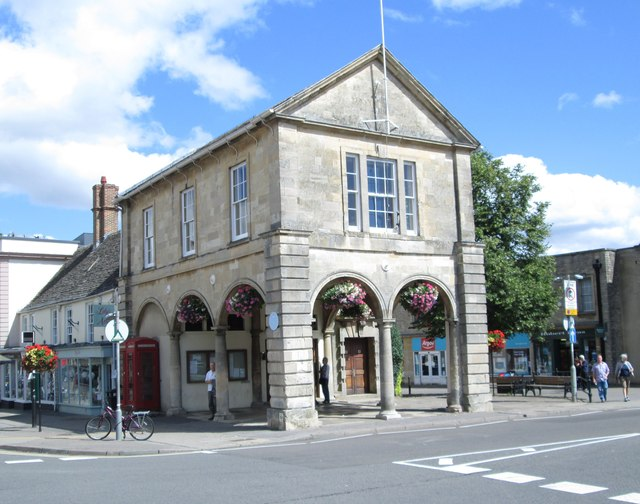
- Witney Town Hall

- Shown in Oxfordshire
- 51.7839°N 1.4853°W
- Location: Market Square, Witney

History
- Built: 1786

Site notes
- Architect: Sir William Chambers
- Architectural style: Neoclassical style

Listed Building – Grade II*
- Official name: Town Hall
- Designated: 14 May 1952
- Reference no.: 1213347

Witney Town Hall is a municipal structure in Spring Lane in Market Square, Witney, Oxfordshire, England. The town hall, which is the headquarters of Witney Town Council, is a Grade II* listed building.

== History ==
The first town hall in Witney was built in the Market Square in 1514. The borough courts held hearings in the building from the mid-16th century and it was used for social events by the 17th century. It was arcaded on the ground floor to allow markets to be held and an assembly room with was established on the first floor. A village lock-up for holding petty criminals was installed in the arcaded area in the early 18th century and a horse-drawn fire engine was installed in the same area in the mid-18th century.

Civic leaders decided to replace the town hall in the early 1780s. The new building was designed in the neoclassical style, probably by Sir William Chambers, built in ashlar stone extracted from a quarry at Black Bourton by masons, James Gulliver and William Harris, and was completed in 1786. The design involved a symmetrical main frontage with three bays facing onto the Market Square: the bays were divided by Tuscan order columns supporting the first floor structure and the meeting room on the first floor featured a large bay window facing onto Langdale Gate.

The town hall became the main meeting place for vestry meetings in the late 18th century. However, after the area was advanced to the status of urban district in 1895, the new civic leaders decided to hold their meetings in the Corn Exchange, rather than the town hall. (Note: Witney Urban District Council relocated from the Corn Exchange to a large Victorian era property at 26 Church Green in 1936.) Once the local borough courts ceased operating in 1925, the town hall fell vacant. Ownership of the building passed to a body known as the Town Hall Charity in 1929, and, following the change of ownership, alterations, which involved filling in the left hand arcade, were carried out to a design by Thomas Rayson in 1930. The work also included installation of public toilets on the ground floor, the fitting of a new staircase and the removal of the bay window on the first floor.

Following the local government re-organisation in 1974, which saw the abolition of Witney Urban District Council, the new parish level body, Witney Town Council, chose to refurbish the town hall at a cost of £15,000 and made the building its main meeting place. These works also saw the removal of the public toilets on the ground floor and the creation of a town clerk's office.

== See also ==
- Grade II* listed buildings in West Oxfordshire
