= Brize Norton and Bampton railway station =

Former railway station in Oxfordshire, England

Brize Norton and Bampton
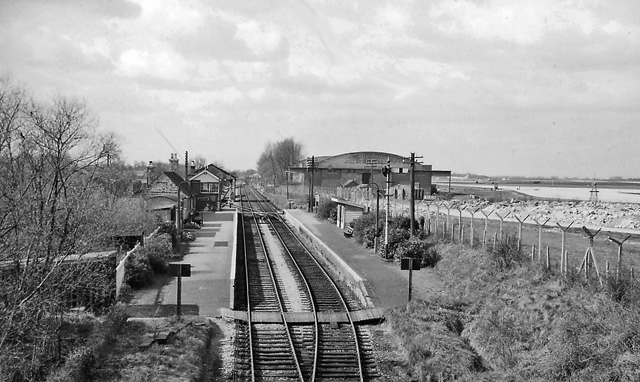
- The station in 1961

General information
- Location: Brize Norton, West Oxfordshire; England
- Coordinates: 51.75179°N 1.55917°W
- Grid reference: SP305060
- Platforms: 2

Other information
- Status: Disused

History
- Original company: East Gloucestershire Railway
- Pre-grouping: Great Western Railway
- Post-grouping: Great Western Railway

Key dates
- 15 January 1873: Station opens as Bampton
- 2 July 1906: Station renamed Bampton (Oxon)
- 1 May 1940: Station renamed Brize Norton and Bampton
- 18 June 1962: Station closes
Location

Brize Norton and Bampton railway station was a railway station 1 mile (1.6 km) south of the village of Brize Norton on the Oxford, Witney and Fairford Railway between Oxford and Fairford. The station had two stone-built platforms, a station building and a goods shed.

== History ==
The station was opened on 15 January 1873 and was originally named Bampton, although it was 2 miles (3.2 km) north of that village. In August 1884 a similarly named station at Bampton, Devon was opened. However, it was not until 2 July 1906 that the Oxfordshire station was distinguished by being renamed Bampton (Oxon), although certain records indicate that the station's name was in fact changed shortly after the opening of the Devon station.

The station was one of two on the East Gloucestershire Railway with two platforms, and a stone-built goods shed was also constructed, as at Lechlade and Fairford. A small goods yard was served by two sidings. The Second World War resulted in the construction of a new concrete loading bank between the goods shed and the station. The goods shed was smaller than those provided on the Witney Railway and could only accommodate a single vehicle. The signal box was of standard Great Western Railway design with 18 levers and, as with other stations on the East Gloucestershire Railway with the exception of Carterton, it was situated on the platform adjacent to the station buildings. The station had a passing loop which, for over 50 years, was the only one on the line. Until Brize Norton airfield was built, the station stood in a rather isolated position, 1.75 miles (2.82 km) to the north of Bampton village. Nevertheless, between 1903 and 1923, an average of 11,000 tickets were collected annually at the station, and around 9,000 tons of goods traffic was handled.

There were a number of airfields in the vicinity of the station: RAF Brize Norton opened in August 1937 and RAF Stanton Harcourt. A siding once ran from the station through the perimeter fence of Brize Norton and into the aerodrome but this was a temporary facility used during the airfield's construction. The airfields were attacked several times, notably in August 1940, but the railway escaped damage. On 1 May 1940, the Great Western Railway renamed the station as Brize Norton and Bampton, which may have been due to the proximity of Brize Norton aerodrome. The position of the station in relation to the airfield meant that when its facilities were extended southwards, two essential taxiways crossed the railway line necessitating wide level crossing gates to span the entire width. Special signalling was installed in the airfield's control tower and in the station's signal box (which was also linked to the control tower), which was presumably similar to the system used by the Northern Counties Committee at RAF Ballykelly where a main runway was crossed on the level by the Belfast–Derry railway line. After the war, the airfields continued to generate significant traffic until the early 1950s when Brize Norton became a USAF base and traffic suddenly fell away.

The station closed along with the East Gloucestershire Railway from Witney to Fairford on 18 June 1962.

| Preceding station | Disused railways | Following station |
|---|---|---|
| Carterton; Line and station closed | Great Western Railway; East Gloucestershire Railway | Witney; Line and station closed |

== Present day ==
The station site remained derelict for a number of years after closure. Several proposals were made for the site including for waste disposal but this was refused by the local council on the basis of the traffic that it would generate. Another proposal by the Witney Plastics Company was turned down because of the danger that it would pose to aircraft. Permission was later granted for an oil storage depot.

The station building was demolished in the mid-1980s after having been partly restored. The goods shed, the last of three such surviving East Gloucestershire Railway structures, was also demolished. The station's site is now covered by a large warehouse complex.
