= Brize Norton =

Village in Oxfordshire, England

Coordinates: 51.766°N 1.566°W

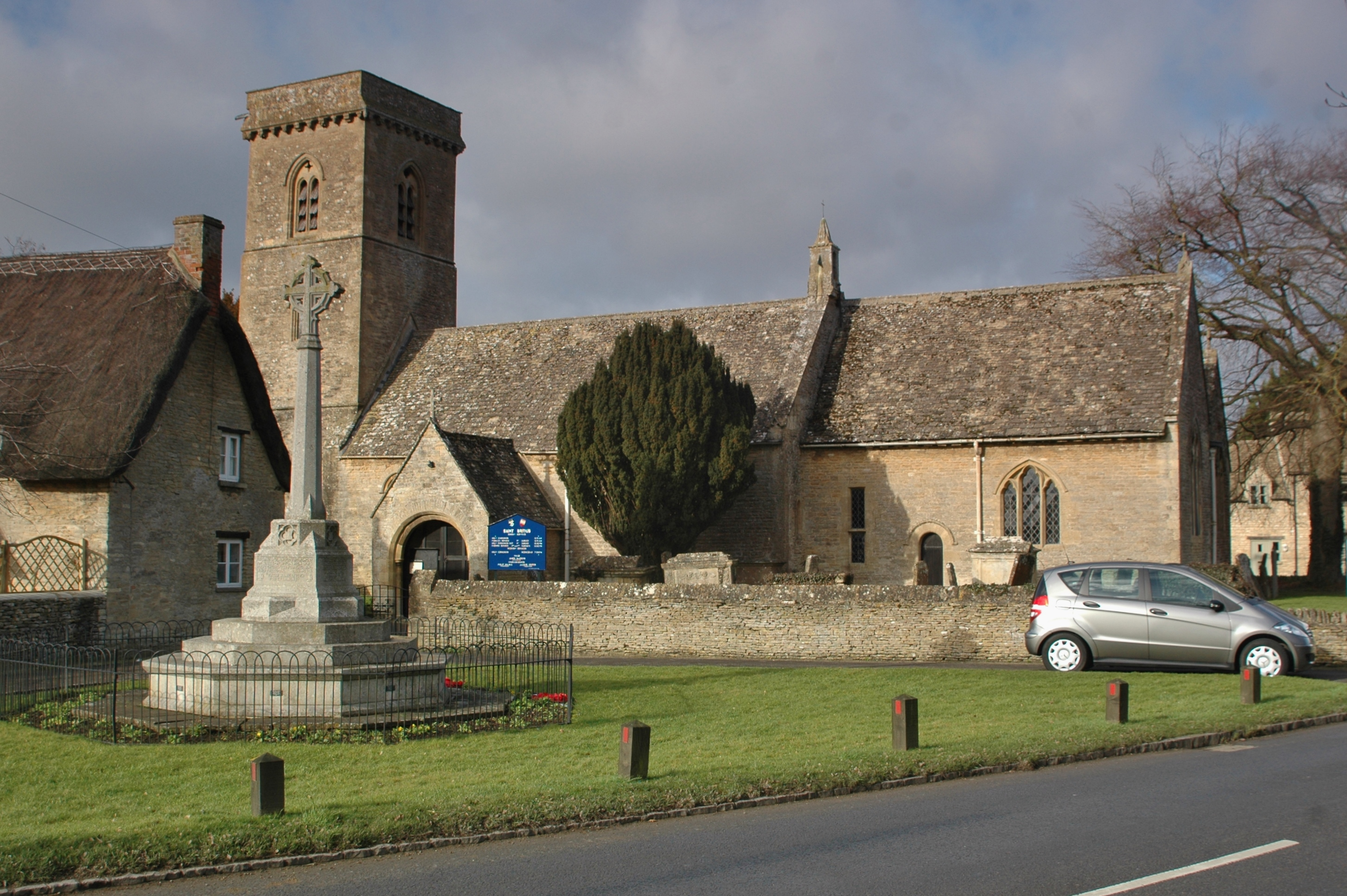
- St. Britius' parish church and parish war memorial

- Location within Oxfordshire
- Population: 938 (2011 Census)
- OS grid reference: SP3007
- Civil parish: Brize Norton
- District: West Oxfordshire
- Shire county: Oxfordshire
- Region: South East
- Country: England
- Sovereign state: United Kingdom
- Post town: Carterton
- Postcode district: OX18
- Dialling code: 01993
- Police: Thames Valley
- Fire: Oxfordshire
- Ambulance: South Central
- UK Parliament: Witney
- Website: Brize Norton Parish Council Website

Brize Norton (/braɪz/) is a village and civil parish 1 mile (1.6 km) east of Carterton in West Oxfordshire. The 2011 Census recorded the parish population as 938. The original part of RAF Brize Norton is in the parish.

== Toponym ==
Around the time of Domesday Book in 1086 the village's toponym was Norton, being the north tun (Old English for village) of Bampton. In 1235, the form Suthnorton ("South Norton") was recorded, evidently to distinguish it from other Nortons further north in Oxfordshire such as Chipping Norton. By the 1260s, the form Norton Brun was in use, referring to the Brun or Brown family who were the parish's manorial lords. Further variants included Brunesnorton in 1297, Brimes Norton in 1303 and Brynes Norton in 1376, but the Norton Brun form outlived them and was still in use early in the 17th century. The form Brysenorton had appeared by 1523, and by the middle of the 17th century it had become the usual form of the name. However, Norton Brun had evolved into Norton Broyne and remained in use in church records until early in the 19th century.

== Church and chapel ==
The Church of England parish church of Saint Britius is Norman. The south doorway with its decorative tympanum, a doorway in the south wall of the chancel and the font date from this time. The porch is in the Transitional style from Norman to Early English Gothic, suggesting it was added slightly later. Early in the 13th century, the north aisle was added, with a four-bay Early English Gothic arcade linking it with the nave. In the second half of the 13th century, the bell tower was added at the west end of the north aisle, and the present east window three lancets was inserted in the chancel. A chapel forms an eastward continuation of the north aisle. Two of its windows are original 13th-century lancets; two square-headed windows were added in the 14th century and the east window of the chapel is modern.

The Gothic Revival architect G.E. Street restored the building in 1868. The tower has a ring of six bells but they are now unusable. The tenor bell was cast by Edward Neale of Burford in 1679. Three more were cast by Mears and Stainbank of the Whitechapel Bell Foundry in 1873. The two youngest bells were cast by John Warner and Sons of Cripplegate in London: one in 1881 and the present treble bell in 1884. St. Britius also has a service bell cast by Naylor, Vickers and Company of Sheffield in 1860. Brize Norton's former Primitive Methodist chapel, built in 1908, is now a private house.

== Economic history ==
In 1861, the East Gloucestershire Railway was built through the parish from Witney to Fairford. The company provided a railway station 1 mile (1.6 km) south of the village on the road to Bampton, and called it Bampton station despite it being much nearer Brize Norton than Bampton. RAF Brize Norton was established in 1937. In 1944, the Great Western Railway renamed the station Brize Norton and Bampton to reflect the increasing importance of the RAF station. British Railways closed the line and station in 1962. The site of the station is now a small industrial estate.

== Amenities ==
Brize Norton has two public houses: The Chequers and The Masons Arms. Brize Norton has a women's Football Club and a Women's Institute. Brize Norton has a village recreational ground, with football and cricket ground surrounded by the Elderbank Village Hall and Sports Pavilion. The Sports Pavilion opens as Humble Bumble Cafe - a unique community facility for this Domesday Book listed village, as well as an 'after match' sports bar. Brize Norton has a primary school which serves children both from the village and from nearby Carterton.

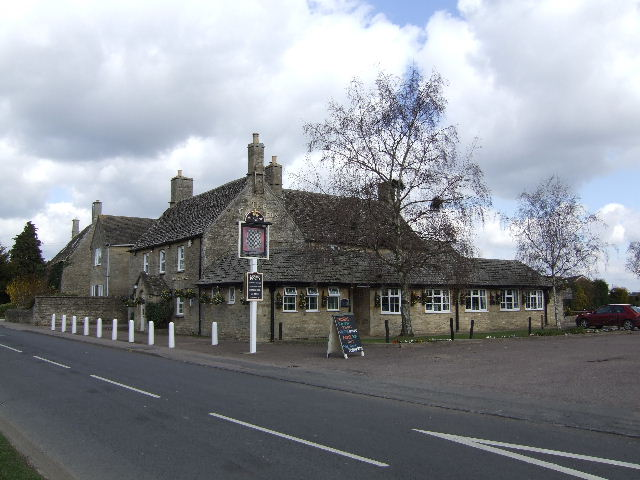
The Chequers

== Transport ==
AW Ship Management arranged for civilians to board RAF flights to and from Brize Norton to RAF Ascension Island. The company had a package deal where passengers could travel in one direction on the RAF flights and the other on the RMS St Helena, which travelled between Saint Helena and Cape Town, South Africa until the opening of St Helena Airport to passenger flights.

== Climate ==
Climate data for Brize Norton (97 m or 318 ft asl, 1991-2020 normals, extremes 1968-)
Month	Jan	Feb	Mar	Apr	May	Jun	Jul	Aug	Sep	Oct	Nov	Dec	Year
Record high °C (°F)	14.7 (58.5)	18.3 (64.9)	21.8 (71.2)	25.9 (78.6)	33.1 (91.6)	33.5 (92.3)	37.0 (98.6)	35.4 (95.7)	30.7 (87.3)	28.3 (82.9)	17.8 (64.0)	15.5 (59.9)	37.0 (98.6)
Mean daily maximum °C (°F)	7.7 (45.9)	8.3 (46.9)	10.9 (51.6)	13.9 (57.0)	17.1 (62.8)	20.1 (68.2)	22.5 (72.5)	21.9 (71.4)	19.0 (66.2)	14.8 (58.6)	10.6 (51.1)	8.0 (46.4)	14.6 (58.3)
Daily mean °C (°F)	4.7 (40.5)	5.0 (41.0)	6.9 (44.4)	9.4 (48.9)	12.4 (54.3)	15.3 (59.5)	17.5 (63.5)	17.2 (63.0)	14.7 (58.5)	11.2 (52.2)	7.4 (45.3)	5.0 (41.0)	10.6 (51.1)
Mean daily minimum °C (°F)	1.7 (35.1)	1.6 (34.9)	3.0 (37.4)	4.8 (40.6)	7.6 (45.7)	10.5 (50.9)	12.6 (54.7)	12.5 (54.5)	10.3 (50.5)	7.5 (45.5)	4.2 (39.6)	2.0 (35.6)	6.6 (43.9)
Record low °C (°F)	−20.7 (−5.3)	−2.0 (28.4)	−7.0 (19.4)	−5.2 (22.6)	−1.3 (29.7)	−0.3 (31.5)	4.5 (40.1)	4.0 (39.2)	−0.5 (31.1)	−3.7 (25.3)	−9.6 (14.7)	−20.9 (−5.6)	−20.9 (−5.6)
Average precipitation mm (inches)	66.2 (2.61)	48.1 (1.89)	46.4 (1.83)	49.2 (1.94)	60.1 (2.37)	49.8 (1.96)	55.1 (2.17)	58.6 (2.31)	54.2 (2.13)	70.9 (2.79)	73.2 (2.88)	74.2 (2.92)	706.0 (27.80)
Average precipitation days (≥ 1.0 mm)	12.3	9.6	9.3	9.9	9.5	8.7	8.4	10.1	8.9	11.4	12.8	12.3	123.4
Mean monthly sunshine hours	62.6	81.3	123.2	171.9	206.1	209.4	214.7	193.4	151.5	111.6	70.8	55.5	1,652
Source 1: Met Office
Source 2: Starlings Roost Weather

== Sources ==
- Colvin, Christina; Cragoe, Carol; Ortenberg, Veronica; Peberdy, R.B.; Selwyn, Nesta; Williamson, Elizabeth (2006). Townley, Simon C. (ed.). A History of the County of Oxford, Volume 15: Bampton Hundred (Part Three). Victoria County History. pp. 205–246.
- Sherwood, Jennifer; Pevsner, Nikolaus (1974). Oxfordshire. The Buildings of England. Harmondsworth: Penguin Books. pp. 487–488. ISBN 0-14-071045-0.
