= Corn Exchange, Witney =

Commercial building in Witney, Oxfordshire, England

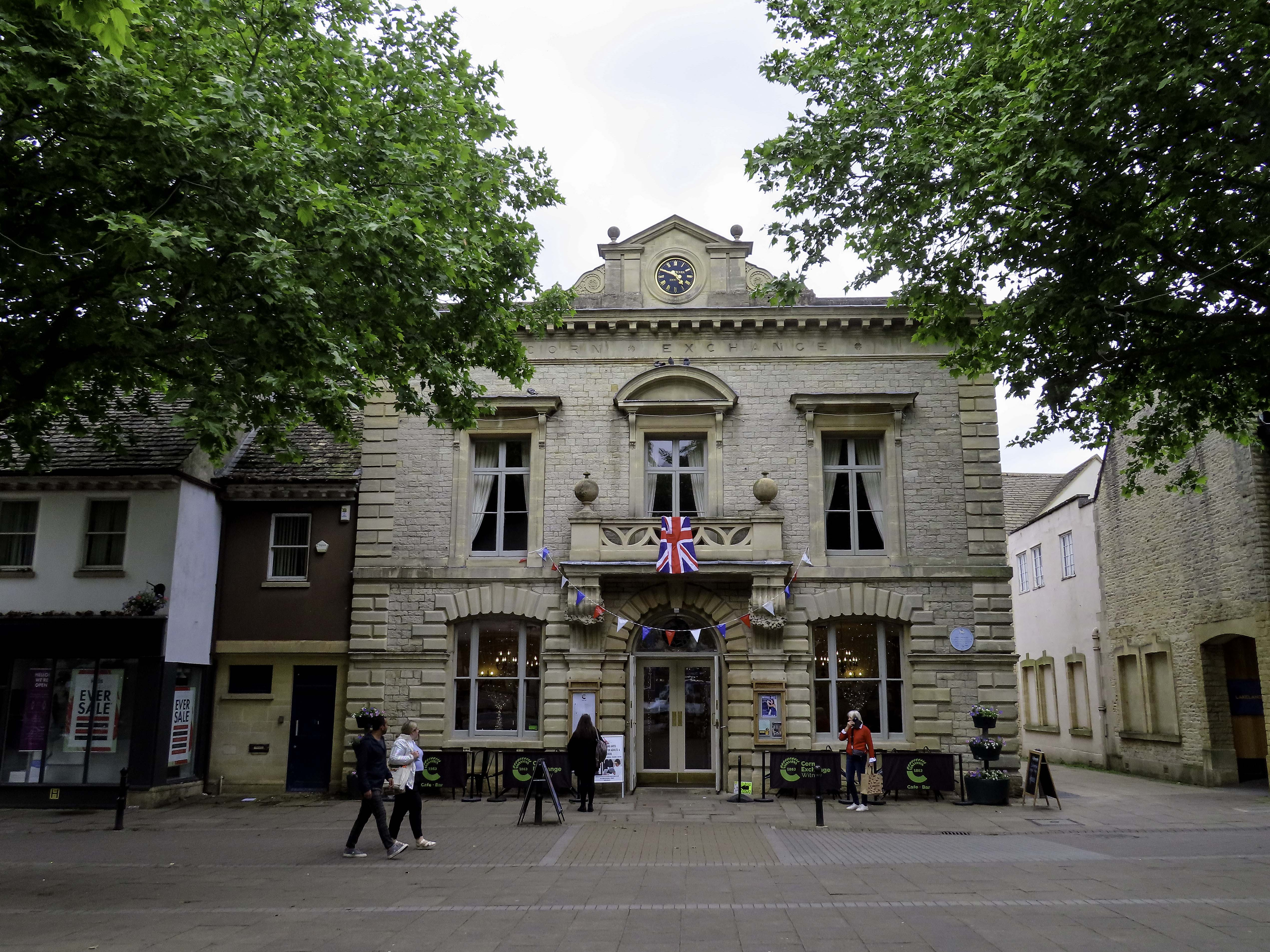
- Corn Exchange, Witney

- Shown in Oxfordshire
- 51.7843°N 1.4849°W
- Location: Market Street, Witney

History
- Built: 1863

Site notes
- Architect: John Collier
- Architectural style: Neoclassical style

Listed Building – Grade II
- Official name: Corn Exchange
- Designated: 6 February 1970
- Reference no.: 1289140

The Corn Exchange is a commercial building in Market Street, Witney, Oxfordshire, England. The structure, which is used as a public events venue, is a Grade II listed building.

== History ==
Until the mid-19th century, corn merchants traded from the ground floor of Witney Town Hall. In the early 1860s, a group of local businessmen decided to form a company, to be known as the "Witney Corn Exchange and Public Rooms Company", to finance and commission a purpose-built corn exchange for the town. The site they chose in Market Street had accommodated the "Corn Returns Office", a structure, which was designed in the Tudor style using timber-frame construction, and which dated from 1593.

The new building was designed by John Collier of Putney in the neoclassical style, built by a local builder, Malachi Bartlett, in ashlar stone at a cost of £2,500 and was officially opened on 17 September 1863. The design involved a symmetrical main frontage of three bays facing onto Market Street. The central bay featured a round headed doorway with a fanlight and a rusticated surround. There was a cross-window, with a segmental pediment and a balcony, supported by brackets, on the first floor. The outer bays were fenestrated by segmental headed sash windows with rusticated architraves on the ground floor and by square headed sash windows with cornices on the first floor. At roof level there was an entablature inscribed with the words "Corn Exchange", a modillioned cornice and a central pediment. The central pediment contained a clock, which was flanked by pairs of pilasters, in the tympanum. Internally, the principal room was the main hall which was 70 feet (21 m) long and 35 feet (11 m) wide.

The use of the building as a corn exchange declined significantly in the wake of the Great Depression of British Agriculture in the late 19th century. After the area was advanced to the status of urban district in 1895, the new civic leaders decided to hold their meetings in the corn exchange, rather than in Witney Town Hall. The council went on to raise the necessary money to acquire the corn exchange, after the Witney Corn Exchange and Public Rooms Company was placed into liquidation in January 1911.

During the First World War the local branch of the Volunteer Training Corps used the corn exchange for drill practice on a weekly basis. Witney Urban District Council relocated from the corn exchange to a large Victorian era property at 26 Church Green in 1936. During the Second World War, the corn exchange was requisitioned for use as an entertainment place for soldiers and was also used by the council for fund raising in support of War Weapons Week.

The building became very dilapidated in the 1960s and was closed for public use in 1968. A local petition was initiated, demanding that the building be restored, in the 1970s. Witney Town Council acquired the corn exchange in July 1977: an extensive programme of refurbishment works costing £150,000 was carried out and the building was re-opened by the mayor, Michael Chadwick, in February 1979. The building was remodelled internally, to enable the ground floor to be used as a cinema, in 1992. Two programmes from the BBC Radio 4 show, Gardeners' Question Time, were recorded in the building in February 2004. The ground floor was further upgraded when tiered seating was installed in 2022, enabling the building to be re-opened by the mayor, Liz Duncan, as an arts and performance hub in March 2023.

== See also ==
- Corn exchanges in England
