= Oxford, Witney and Fairford Railway =

Abandoned branch line in Oxfordshire and Gloucestershire

The Oxford, Witney and Fairford Railway was a single track railway branch line, 22 miles (35 km) long, in Oxfordshire and Gloucestershire in England in the United Kingdom. It was opened in succession by two companies, the first in 1861 to connect the important wool-producing town of Witney to the main line network, and the second in 1873 as the rump of an ambitious scheme to connect to Cheltenham, but which ran only between Witney and Fairford. The junction with the main line was at Yarnton, north of Oxford.

The Great Western Railway worked the two companies' lines as a single branch line from 1873, and later absorbed them. British Railways withdrew passenger services in 1962; a residual goods service to Witney remained until 1970.

== The Witney Railway ==
=== Origins ===
Witney had been an important town with a significant woollen industry, but found itself at a competitive disadvantage as northern manufacturing towns gained railway connections. A number of schemes were put forward, including a possible branch from the London and Birmingham Railway at Tring.

The Oxford, Worcester and Wolverhampton Railway (OW&WR) opened on 4 June 1853 from Wolvercot Junction, on the Great Western Railway (GWR) a little north of Oxford to Evesham, and Witney had at least a nearby station at Handborough. (Note: The correct name of the station from Jenkins, confirmed by, for example, the 1895 Bradshaw reprinted by the Middleton Press. British Rail renamed it Hanborough on 28 September 1992 according to Butt; the 1876 Ordnance Survey map shows both the town and the station as "Hanborough".)

Witney Railway Act 1859
- Act of Parliament
- Parliament of the United Kingdom
- Long title: An Act for connecting the Town of Witney with the existing Railways in the Parishes of Yarnton and Wolvercot in the County of Oxford, and for other Purposes.
- Citation: 22 & 23 Vict. c. xlvi

Dates
- Royal assent: 1 August 1859

Witney Railway Act 1861
- Act of Parliament
- Parliament of the United Kingdom
- Long title: An Act to enable the Witney Railway Company to make a Road to their Station at Witney; and for other Purposes.
- Citation: 24 & 25 Vict. c. xxii

Dates
- Royal assent: 17 May 1861

Witney Railway Act 1864
- Act of Parliament
- Parliament of the United Kingdom
- Long title: An Act to enable the Witney Railway Company to raise a further Sum of Money; and for other Purposes.
- Citation: 27 & 28 Vict. c. ci

Dates
- Royal assent: 23 June 1864

Text of statute as originally enacted

Witney Railway Act 1872
- Act of Parliament
- Parliament of the United Kingdom
- Long title: An Act to enable the Witney Railway Company to borrow further Moneys; to confer powers with reference to traffic and other arrangements on the Witney, Great Western, and East Gloucestershire Railway Companies; and for other purposes.
- Citation: 35 & 36 Vict. c. xcv

Dates
- Royal assent: 18 July 1872

Nonetheless a railway to Witney itself was desirable, and after some false starts a public meeting was held on 23 December 1858 to propose a branch line from the OW&WR at Yarnton, where there was to be a new junction station. Sir Charles Fox was appointed Engineer and in the 1859 session a bill was presented to Parliament to authorise the railway. Despite GWR opposition, the Witney Railway was authorised by the Witney Railway Act 1859 (22 & 23 Vict. c. xlvi) of 1 August 1859. Capital was to be £50,000 in shares and £16,000 in borrowings. (Note: Jenkins says £34,000 in shares and £16,000 in borrowings, but this seems to be an error; the phrase Capital £50,000 and one-third of the sum in debentures may have been misinterpreted.)

=== Opening to Witney ===
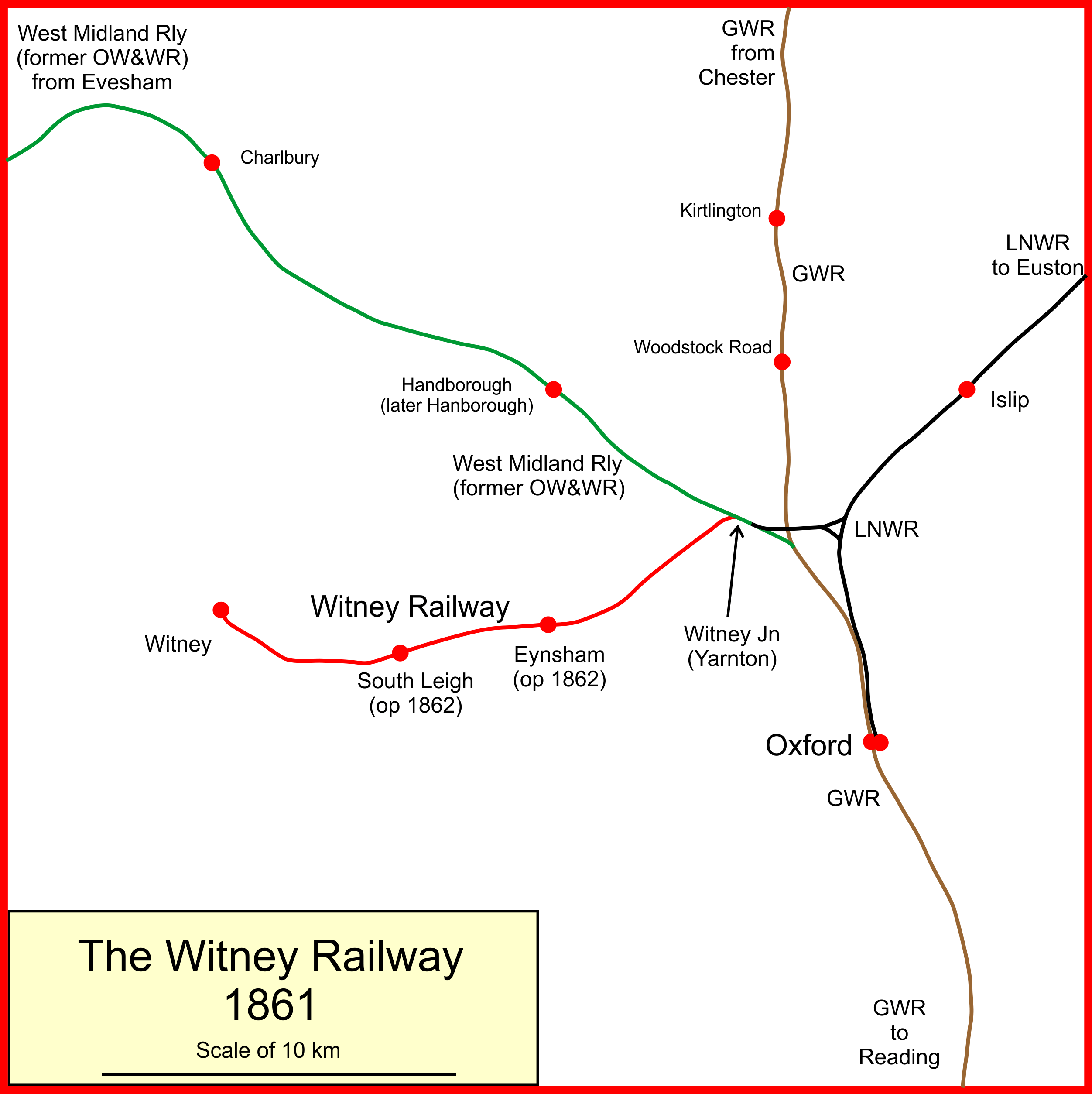
The Witney Railway and its connections in 1861

Joseph Pickering was appointed contractor to build the line, and an arrangement was made with the OW&WR company for it to work the line for 10 years for 50% of gross receipts. By the time of opening, the OW&WR had merged with another company and formed the West Midland Railway.

On 5 November 1861 Captain Tyler of the Board of Trade made a formal inspection. He approved the line for opening, noting that the Witney station was temporary only, "pending construction of a permanent station, the probable site of which is as yet uncertain". There was no turntable at Witney, so only tank engines might be used, and a turntable was to be provided within twelve months. Sidings seem not to have been provided at first. The line was single, and eight miles long, (Note: Actually 8 miles 13 chains (13.1 km).) with earthworks and overbridges made for double track. It was to be worked on the one engine in steam principle.

The permanent way employed Seaton rails, in which the material below the head was formed in an inverted V in section; the rail was supported on a triangular longitudinal timber itself bedded on longitudinal timbers. Tyler commented that

This form of rail is not well adapted for obtaining a maximum of strength from the iron employed, but the roadway will I conceive be a safe one for the light traffic There is one disadvantage attending it, that it is not available for the application of points and crossings, and where these are employed, other forms of rails have to be intermingled with it.

The line was ceremonially opened amid considerable festivity on 13 November 1861, and the public passenger service started the next day, 14 November 1861. (Note: MacDermot says 18 November 1861; Carter says 20 November.) As the connections to the goods facilities were not yet in place, the operation of a goods service was delayed until 1 March 1862, a local contractor Malachi Bartlett being brought in to complete work apparently left unfinished by Pickering. It appears that goods working was performed by mixed (passenger and goods) trains.

There were four or five daily return trips to Oxford in the early years of the line's operation. Intermediate stations were at South Leigh and Eynsham.

At the time of planning the new line, the OW&WR was running through trains to London over the London and North Western Railway (LNWR) and Yarnton would have been an important interchange. By the time of opening, the OW&WR had changed its allegiance to the GWR, and Yarnton lost its significance. Building the new station there was the responsibility of the West Midland Railway, and they delayed opening it until summer 1863. It had a separate bay platform and run-round for the Witney trains.

The company was profitable, earning annually between £4,000 and £4,600 throughout its first decade.

== The East Gloucestershire Railway ==
East Gloucestershire Railway Act 1862
- Act of Parliament
- Parliament of the United Kingdom
- Long title: An Act for incorporating a Company; and for making and maintaining the East Gloucestershire Railway; and for other Purposes.
- Citation: 25 & 26 Vict. c. ccvi

Dates
- Royal assent: 7 August 1862

East Gloucestershire Railway Act 1864
- Act of Parliament
- Parliament of the United Kingdom
- Long title: An Act to authorize the Construction of Railways from Cheltenham to Witney in Oxfordshire, and to Faringdon in Berkshire, to be called "The East Gloucestershire Railway."
- Citation: 27 & 28 Vict. c. cclxxxv

Dates
- Royal assent: 29 July 1864

Text of statute as originally enacted

The East Gloucestershire Railway was originally conceived as a through line from Faringdon to Cheltenham, with a branch to Witney. It obtained an authorising act of Parliament, the East Gloucestershire Railway Act 1862 (25 & 26 Vict. c. ccvi), with share capital of £600,000, but Great Western Railway (GWR) opposition frustrated the promoters' intentions, and a second act of Parliament, the East Gloucestershire Railway Act 1864 (27 & 28 Vict. c. cclxxxv), was obtained on 29 July 1864, for a 50 miles (80 km) line to be worked by the Midland Railway. The GWR appealed against the arrangement, and the powers were reduced to building a 14 miles (23 km) line from Witney to Fairford, with share capital of £300,000.

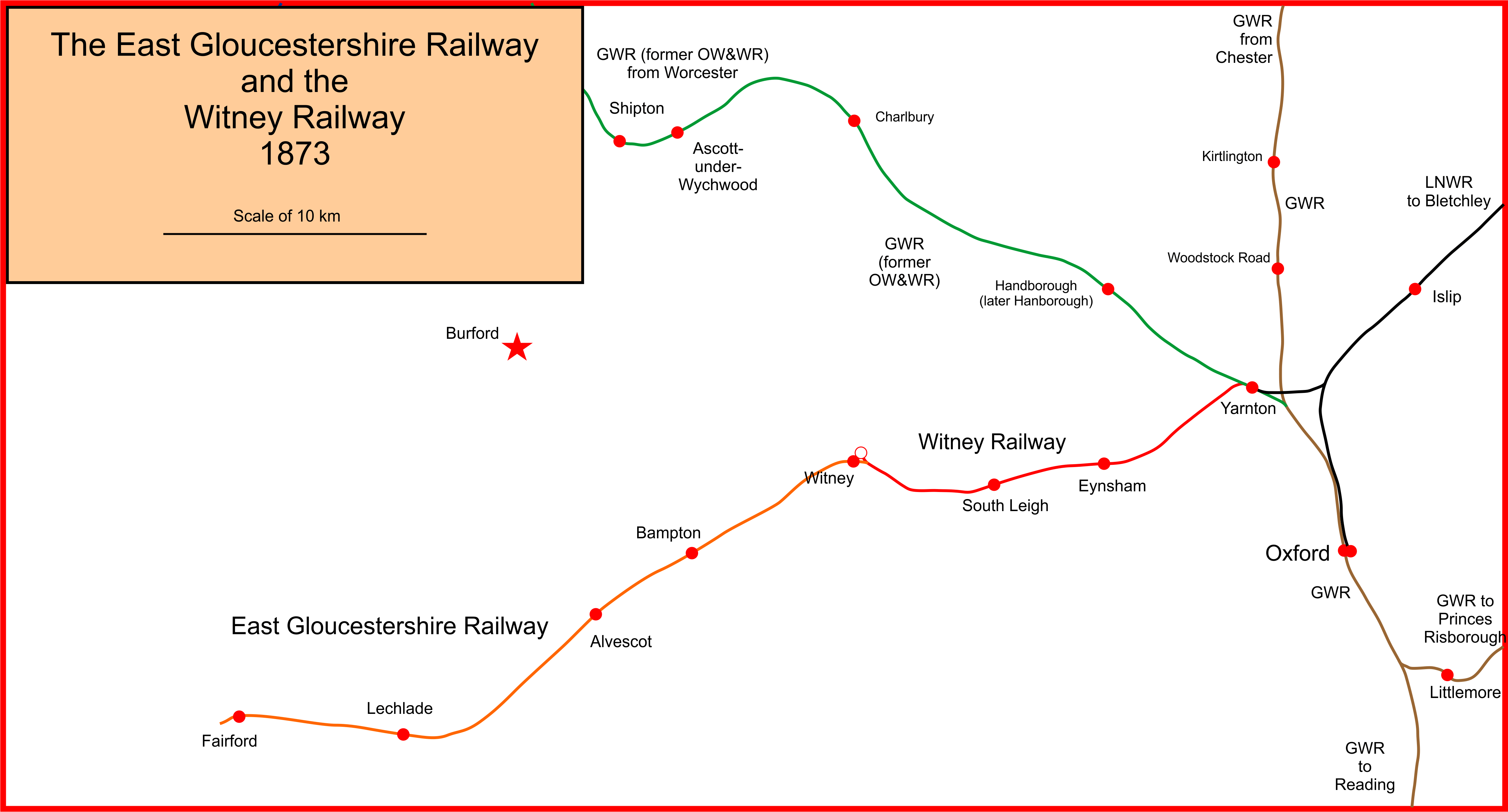
The East Gloucestershire Railway and its connections on opening

The usual Board of Trade inspection took place on 10 January 1873 and the line was opened with the usual ceremony on 14 January 1873, with ordinary passenger operation starting the next day. In effect the line was simply an extension of the Witney line. The junction at Witney was on the Oxford side of the original Witney station, so that the new Witney station was on the new line; the former Witney station was reduced to the status of a goods station.

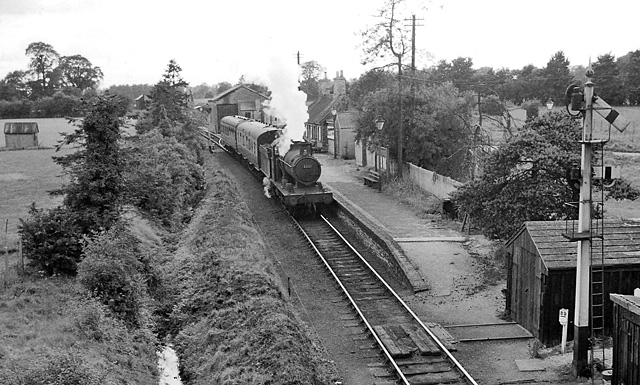
Fairford station in 1961

Stations on the new line were therefore Fairford, Lechlade, Alvescot, Bampton and Witney. The GWR operated the line (as a continuous branch incorporating the Witney line and the new extension) and also maintained the line.

== Absorption by the GWR ==
Whereas the Witney Railway had achieved its objective, of connecting the town to the railway network, the East Gloucestershire Railway failed in its long-distance objective. Limited to a local service only, and being worked by and dependent on the GWR, the question of its absorption by the larger company arose. The East Gloucestershire Company was absorbed by share purchase on 1 July 1890; the Witney Railway Company sold out on the same date. They were absorbed into the GWR by the Great Western Railway Act 1890 (53 & 54 Vict. c. clix)

The line was now in effect the Fairford branch of the GWR.

== Stations and features on the line ==
The stations on the line were:

- Fairford; the configuration showed its conception as a through station, with a platform on the Cheltenham side of Lechlade Road overbridge, and the run-round loop and goods shed to the west of it.
- Lechlade
- Kelmscott and Langford; opened on 4 November 1907; initially referred to as a platform.
- Alvescot
- Carterton; opened on 2 October 1944 to serve the new RAF station at Brize Norton.
- Bampton; renamed Brize Norton and Bampton on 1 May 1940.
- Witney; the passenger station was the new, through station built by the East Gloucestershire Railway; the original Witney Railway terminus was a goods station on a short spur.
- South Leigh
- Eynsham
- Cassington Halt; opened on 9 March 1936; on the south side of the Cheltenham main road, the access was found to be dangerous and in 1947 it was moved to the north side, where direct access to the village was provided, avoiding the main road crossing.

== Later years ==
British Railways (BR) closed the line to passenger traffic on 18 June 1962. The section between Yarnton and Witney only remained open to goods traffic until 2 November 1970, when BR closed it completely.

== Reopening the railway ==
There is a strong case for reopening the line, with severe traffic congestion on the roads to and from Oxford.

In June 2009 the Association of Train Operating Companies (ATOC), since 2017 the Rail Delivery Group, published "Connecting Communities: Expanding Access to the Rail Network." Restoring a rail connection for Witney was one of 20 schemes recommended for 'review in the light of the consultation responses to the study, with the costs and benefits refined/updated using NATA, and in the light of increasing population and employment figures.'

In January 2019, the Campaign for Better Transport released a report identifying this line was listed as Priority 2 for reopening. Priority 2 is for those lines which require further development or a change in circumstances (such as housing developments).

== Sources ==
- Butt, R. V. J. (October 1995). The Directory of Railway Stations: details every public and private passenger station, halt, platform and stopping place, past and present (1st ed.). Sparkford: Patrick Stephens Ltd. ISBN 978-1-85260-508-7. OCLC 60251199. OL 11956311M.
- Carter, E F (1959). An Historical Geography of the Railways of the British Isles. London: Cassell.
- Christiansen, Rex (1981). A Regional History of the Railways of Great Britain. Vol. 13 – Thames and Severn. Newton Abbot: David & Charles. ISBN 0-7153-8004-4.
- Cobb, Col M H (2003). The Railways of Great Britain – A Historical Atlas. Shepperton: Ian Allan Publishing Limited. ISBN 0-7110-3003-0.
- Jenkins, Stanley C (1975). The Witney & East Gloucestershire Railway (Fairford Branch). Locomotion Papers. Vol. 86. Tarrant Hinton: Oakwood Press. ISSN 0305-5493.
- Jenkins, Stanley C (Summer 2013). "Witney & the Witney Railway". Great Western Railway Journal. Didcot: Wild Swan Publications Ltd.
- MacDermot, E T (1927). History of the Great Western Railway, volume I: 1833–1863. Paddington: Great Western Railway.
