= Lechlade railway station =

Former railway station in England

Lechlade
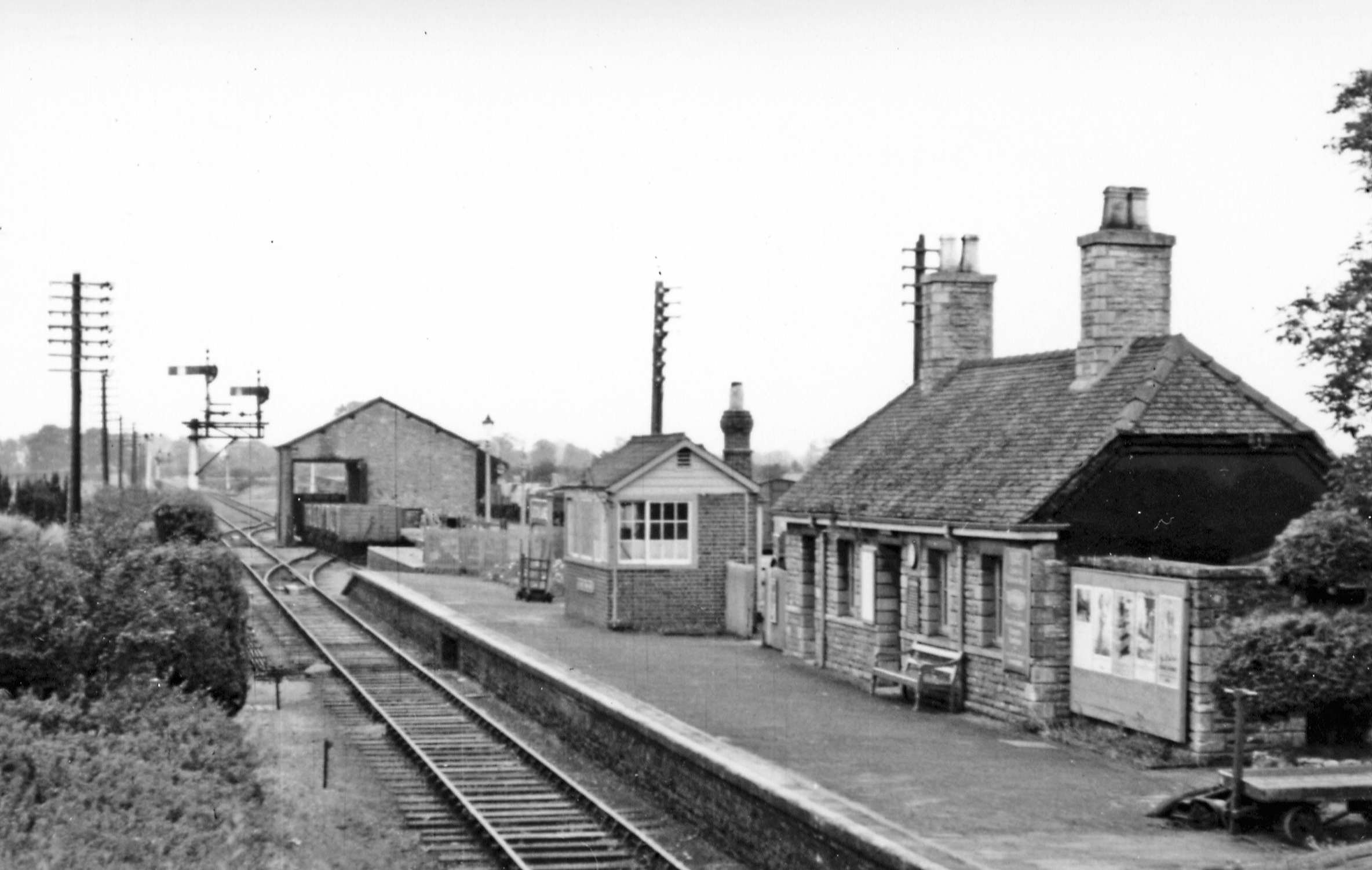
- Lechlade station, 1950

General information
- Location: Lechlade, Cotswold; England
- Coordinates: 51.70300°N 1.68513°W
- Grid reference: SP218006
- Platforms: 1

Other information
- Status: Disused

History
- Original company: East Gloucestershire Railway
- Pre-grouping: Great Western Railway
- Post-grouping: Great Western Railway

Key dates
- 15 January 1873: Station opens
- 18 June 1962: Station closes
Location

Lechlade railway station served the small town of Lechlade in Gloucestershire, England. The station was on the Oxford, Witney and Fairford Railway, between Oxford and Fairford, it was built where the line crossed the road to Burford, 1/2 mile (0.8 km) north of Lechlade.

== History ==
The station was opened on 15 January 1873 by the East Gloucestershire Railway. It was a simple, single-platform station, built of honey-coloured local Cotswold stone which reflected the architecture of the nearby villages. It had a goods shed served by a single siding. By the late 1920s, a signalbox and a loading dock had been added. The signalbox was a standard Great Western model with 17 levers and the only one on the line to have track-circuiting installed. The goods yard contained a loop to allow trains to run-around but this was not signalled for use by passing trains. In 1933, a ground frame locked by an electric interlocking lever from the signal box was installed at the eastern entrance to the loop and a new inner home signal was erected. It was not until the Second World War, when the line was busy with traffic for RAF Fairford, that the Great Western Railway signalled and lengthened the loop to allow two goods trains or one passenger train and one goods service to cross. A second goods siding was also added by October 1944, by which time the ground frame had been removed.

Lechlade was the first station on the line in Gloucestershire and the only one on the East Gloucestershire Railway which was situated near the village which it was supposed to serve. Until the opening of Kelmscott and Langford in 1907, Lechlade was the nearest station to Kelmscott and the residence of William Morris at Kelmscott Manor. The station was used by Morris and other Pre-Raphaelites such as Dante Gabriel Rossetti when travelling to Kelmscott. It was also the station to which Morris's body was brought by train from London following his death there on 3 October 1896. The station was one of the busier ones on the line: 6,796 tickets were issued in 1903 and 5,860 in 1923, while 10,037 tons of goods traffic was handled in 1913 and 709 parcels were dispatched in 1923.

The station was closed along with the East Gloucestershire Railway on 18 June 1962.

Preceding station	Disused railways	Following station
Fairford; Line and station closed	Great Western Railway; East Gloucestershire Railway	Kelmscott and Langford; Line and station closed

== Present day ==
The station remained intact for a number of years after closure, but all trace had gone by 1978. The site was used as a coal yard until the early 1980s. A field adjoining the site became a gravel pit. The site had houses built on it in 2017-2018 and the remains of the bridge over the road was flattened out to make the new road into the housing estate.
