= Fairford railway station =

Former railway station in England

Fairford
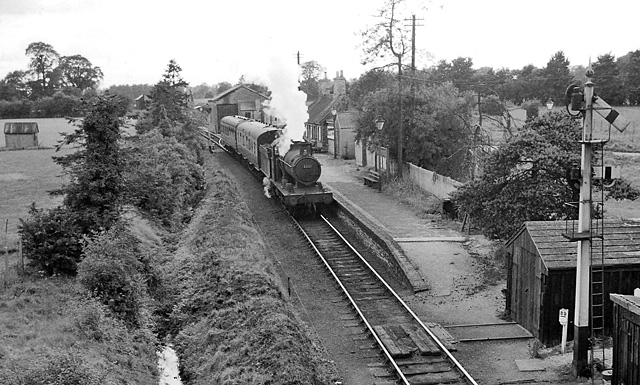
- Fairford railway station in 1961

General information
- Location: Fairford, Cotswold; England
- Coordinates: 51.70706°N 1.76059°W
- Grid reference: SP165009
- Platforms: 1

Other information
- Status: Disused

History
- Original company: East Gloucestershire Railway
- Pre-grouping: Great Western Railway
- Post-grouping: Great Western Railway

Key dates
- 15 January 1873: Station opens
- 18 June 1962: Station closes
Location

Fairford railway station served the town of Fairford in Gloucestershire. It was the western terminus of the Oxford, Witney and Fairford Railway between Oxford and Fairford. It had one platform, and a stone-built station building.

== History ==
The station was opened on 15 January 1873 by the East Gloucestershire Railway (EGR). It was built in open fields beside the road to Lechlade, 1 mile (1.6 km) east of Fairford. As with the stations at Lechlade and Alvescot, Fairford was a simple, single-platform structure, built of honey-coloured local Cotswold stone which reflected the architecture of the nearby villages. There was also a standard Great Western Railway signalbox, a Pagoda Platform Shelter and a small permanent way shed which housed a motorised trolley. Near the engine shed was a water tank and an old horsebox used as a mess hut, while a spur led to a 45-foot (14 m) turntable and a coaling stage. The tank was driven by a steam supplied from locomotive injectors.

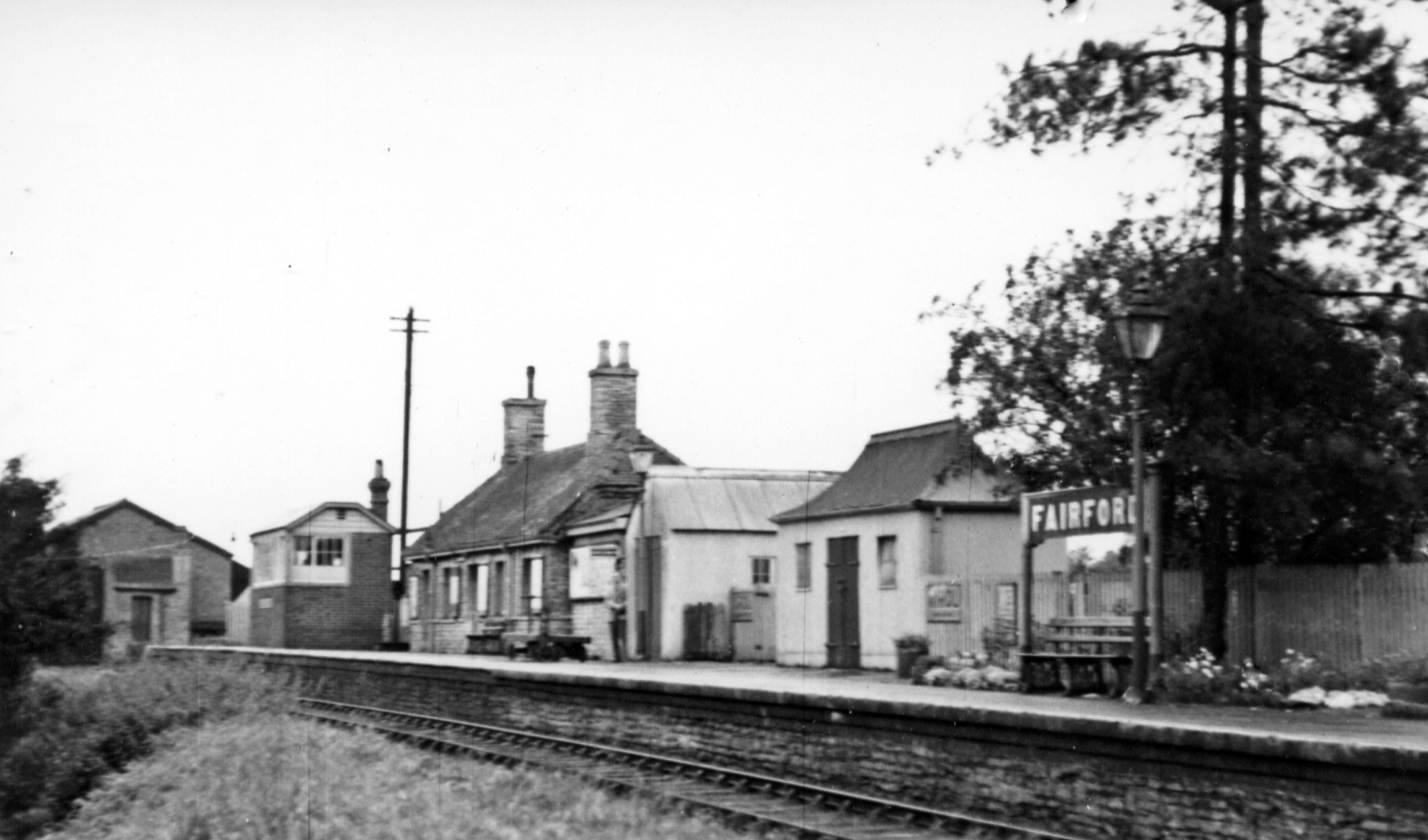
Fairford station, 1950.

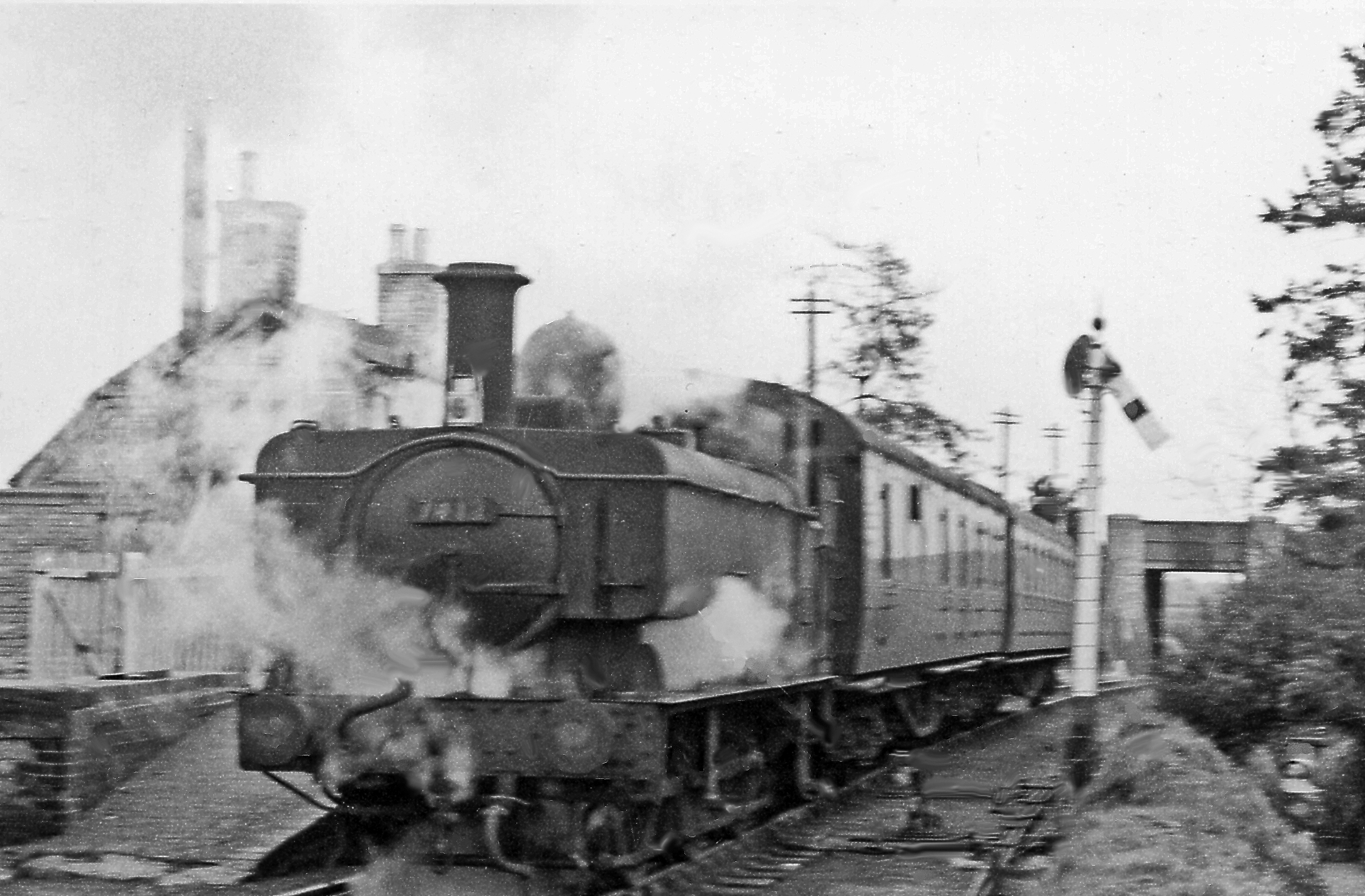
GWR 7400 No. 7412 with a local train to Oxford in February 1962.

The station was not designed as a terminus: the line continued a further 500 yards (460 m) west of the station and doubled to form a run-around loop, finally ending at a buffer stop with a carriage siding on one side and a timber engine shed on the other. There were several attempts at extending the line beyond Fairford. The original scheme would have seen the line run from Cheltenham via Andoversford and the Coln Valley to Fairford and Lechlade where it would divide into two routes: an eastern branch to Witney and a southern line to join up with the Faringdon Railway. This was opposed by the Great Western Railway whose Cheltenham to Swindon line provided a shorter route to London and which was wary of proposals which might allow the London and North Western Railway to compete for its South Wales traffic. Agreement was reached with the Great Western for a modified route via Bourton-on-the-Water on the Banbury and Cheltenham Direct Railway but the Great Western withdrew its support following objections from shareholders who felt that the scheme was a risky and unnecessary proposition. Although the East Gloucestershire Railway obtained Parliamentary approval for its initial proposal via Andoversford, it could not finance it and decided to concentrate on the section between Fairford and Witney. The next attempt was made in 1890 when the Great Western offered to purchase the East Gloucestershire and Witney Railways, leading the directors of the East Gloucestershire to enquire with the Witney directors as to whether they would support an approach to the Midland and South Western Junction Railway for an extension to Cirencester. The Witney directors declined as they had received a good offer from the Great Western for their shares. In 1895, the Midland Railway, London and North Western Railway and Manchester, Sheffield and Lincolnshire Railway proposed a trunk route to South Wales via Fairford and Oxford. This was defeated by the Great Western by buying off the support of the Manchester company through certain concessions. Another proposal came in 1899 when a group of local businessmen and landowners put forward a scheme under the Light Railways Act 1896 for a line parallel to the A40 road which was backed by the Oxfordshire and Gloucestershire County Councils but did not secure the support of the government and was abandoned in 1903. Finally, during the Second World War, thought was given to connecting the Fairford branch with the Highworth Branch Line using a 6-mile (9.7 km) spur between Lechlade and Hannington. The upturn in fortunes meant that the proposal was not taken further.

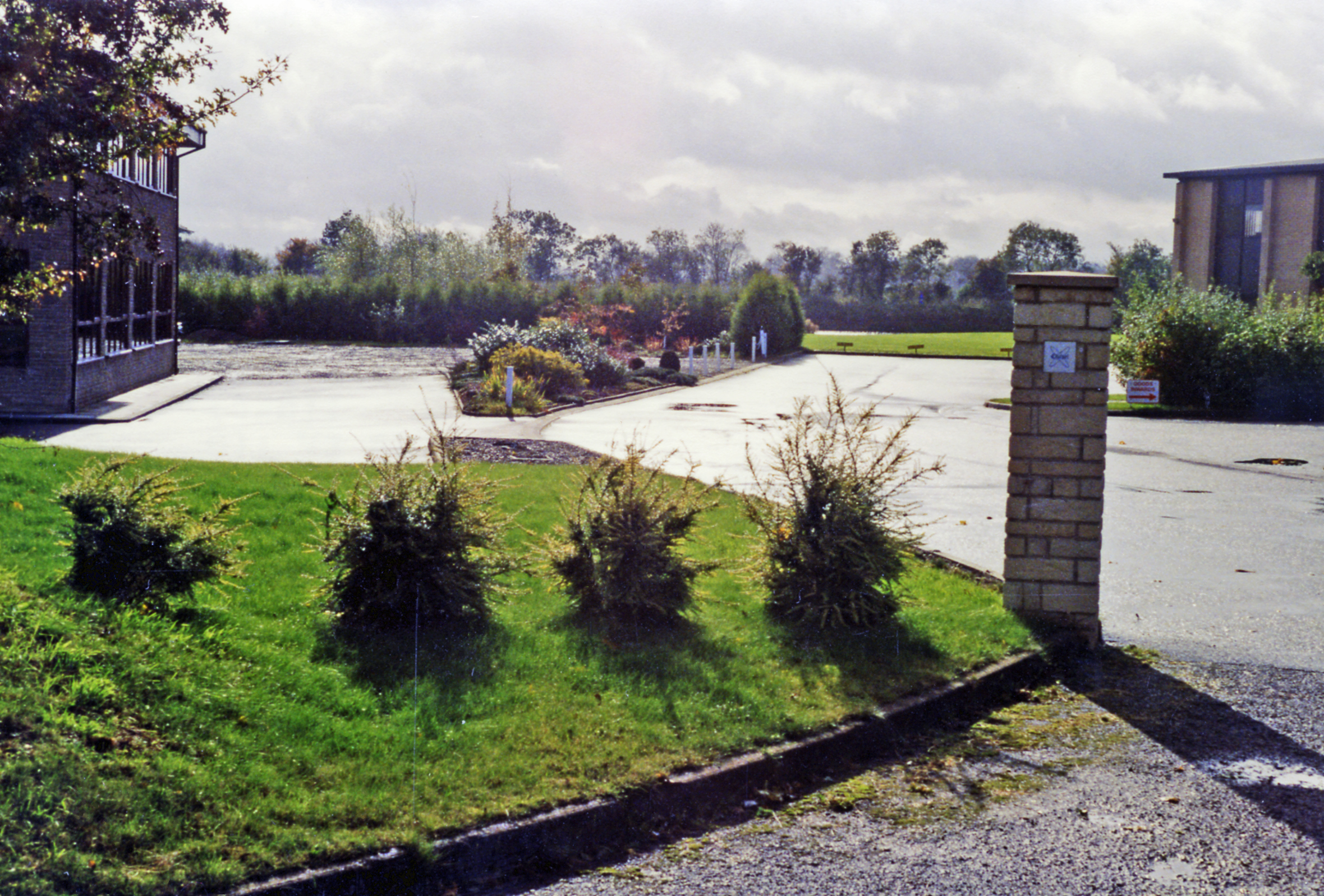
Station site in 1992.

As Fairford had not been conceived as a terminus, its layout created a number of problems. The 246-foot (75 m) platform was inconveniently sited across the station throat which prevented the yard from being easily shunted if there was a train at the platform. In the event, this defect did not need to be remedied as the station was never particularly busy; receipts from 1903, 1913 and 1923 show that on average 6,500 tickets were issued whilst goods traffic handled never exceeded 10,000 tons and around 400 parcels were dispatched, although there was at one time a substantial milk traffic with 15,000 gallons being sent daily to London. In addition, there was insufficient space for the engine to run around the train for the return journey, meaning that the train had to be pulled forward to the goods loop where the engine was detached and positioned on the adjacent track to haul the coaches to the buffers using a cable until the points were cleared and the engine could regain its position.

During the Second World War, Fairford station was busy with traffic for RAF Fairford and a second goods siding was added to the station in 1944. The station was closed along with the East Gloucestershire Railway on 18 June 1962. In its last days, the station had no more than a dozen regular users.

Preceding station	Disused railways	Following station
Terminus	Great Western Railway; East Gloucestershire Railway	Lechlade; Line and station closed

== Present day ==
After closure, the station building was adapted as offices by Antocks Lairn and survived among the industrial units which were constructed on the former goods yard. At some point after 1991, the structure was demolished and replaced by a modern industrial unit. The outline of the infilled turntable pit was still visible in 1991.
