= Cutteslowe =

Suburb of Oxford, England

Coordinates: 51.790°N 1.267°W

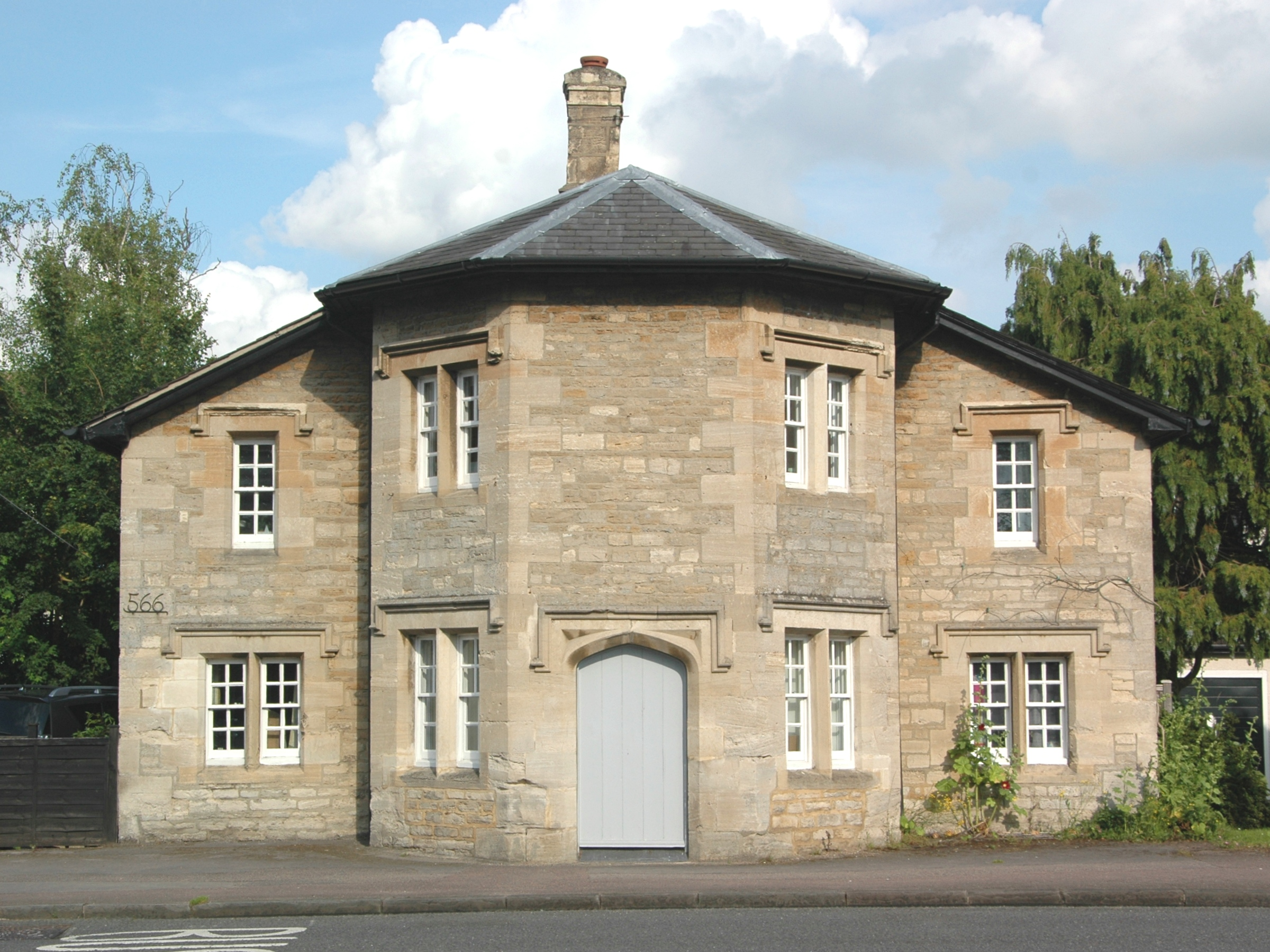
- Turnpike Cottage, 566 Banbury Road

- Location within Oxfordshire
- OS grid reference: SP5010
- Civil parish: unparished
- District: Oxford
- Shire county: Oxfordshire
- Region: South East
- Country: England
- Sovereign state: United Kingdom
- Post town: Oxford
- Postcode district: OX2
- Dialling code: 01865
- Police: Thames Valley
- Fire: Oxfordshire
- Ambulance: South Central
- UK Parliament: Oxford West and Abingdon
- Website: Cutteslowe Community Association

Cutteslowe (/ˈkʌtsloʊ/ KUTS-loh) is a suburb in the north of Oxford, in Oxfordshire, England, between Sunnymead and Water Eaton.

== Archaeology and toponym ==
The toponym "Cutteslowe" is derived from Old English. The earliest known record of it is from AD 1004 as Cuðues hlaye, which seems to be a mis-spelling of Cuðues hlawe. A hlāw is a burial mound, in this case for someone called Cūþen or Cūþwine. The village of Cuddesdon, about 9 miles (14 km) southeast of Cutteslowe, is also named after someone called Cūþwine. It is not clear whether the two toponyms refer to the same Cūþwine.

The Domesday Book of 1086 records Cutteslowe as Codeslam or Codeslaue. Later mediaeval spellings include Cudeslawe, Codeslowe, Kodeslawe, Codeslawe, Cudeslawia, Cudeslowe, Cudeslauya, Cuddeslawe, Culdeslauia and Coteslowe. In 1797 it was recorded as Cutslow or Old Cutslow.

The burial mound was prehistoric, and was razed in the 13th century after two people were found murdered in the hollow below it. An assize roll records that in 1261 a jury of Wootton hundred court "testify that evil doers are wont to lurk in the hollow of the how, and that many robberies and homicides have been committed there. Therefore the sheriff was commanded to level the how."

== Manor ==
By 1004 St Frideswide's Minster in Oxford held two hides of land at Cutteslowe. St Frideswide's became an Augustinian Priory, which continued to hold Cutteslowe until it was suppressed in 1525. It then passed to Thomas Wolsey's Cardinal College until Wolsey's downfall and attainder in 1529. Cardinal College became King Henry VIII's College until 1545, and then Christ Church.

Cutteslowe changed hands three times before it was bought in about 1588 by William Lenthall, grandfather of the William Lenthall who was Speaker of the Long Parliament. Between 1611 and 1625 John Lenthall sold Cutteslowe to Sir John Walter of Sarsden near Churchill, Oxfordshire. Most of the estate was sold by a later Sir John Walter in 1703, and by 1737 had been acquired by Christ Church, Oxford. Sir John sold about 22 acres (9 ha) to Dr Robert South who used it to endow his school at Islip, Oxfordshire.

Sir John sold most of what remained in 1710 to John Churchill, 1st Duke of Marlborough, in whose family it remained until 1811, when George Spencer-Churchill, 6th Duke of Marlborough sold or exchanged his part to Francis Gregory. In 1918 Gregory's granddaughters sold Cutteslowe to the Soden family. The Sodens sold some of the land for development in 1931 and the remainder to Oxford City Council in 1936, which turned it into Cutteslowe Park.

== Turnpike ==
The main road between Oxford and Banbury passes through Cutteslowe. It was turnpiked in the 18th century and disturnpiked in the 19th century.

== Cutteslowe Park ==
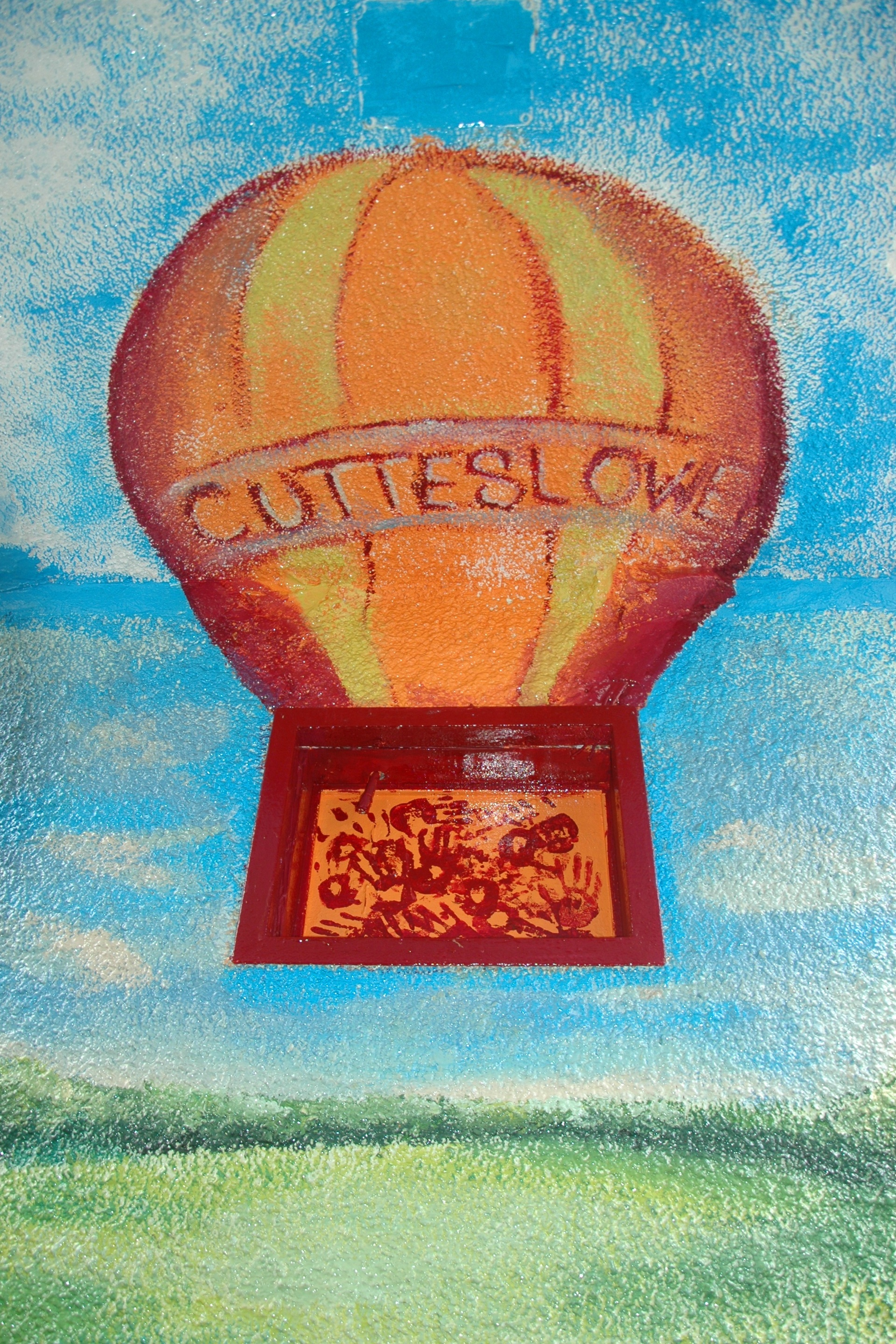
Mural in pedestrian subway under the A40 Elsfield Way

North of the A40 Elsfield Way is Cutteslowe Park, which was made a public park in 1936.

== Cutteslowe Walls ==
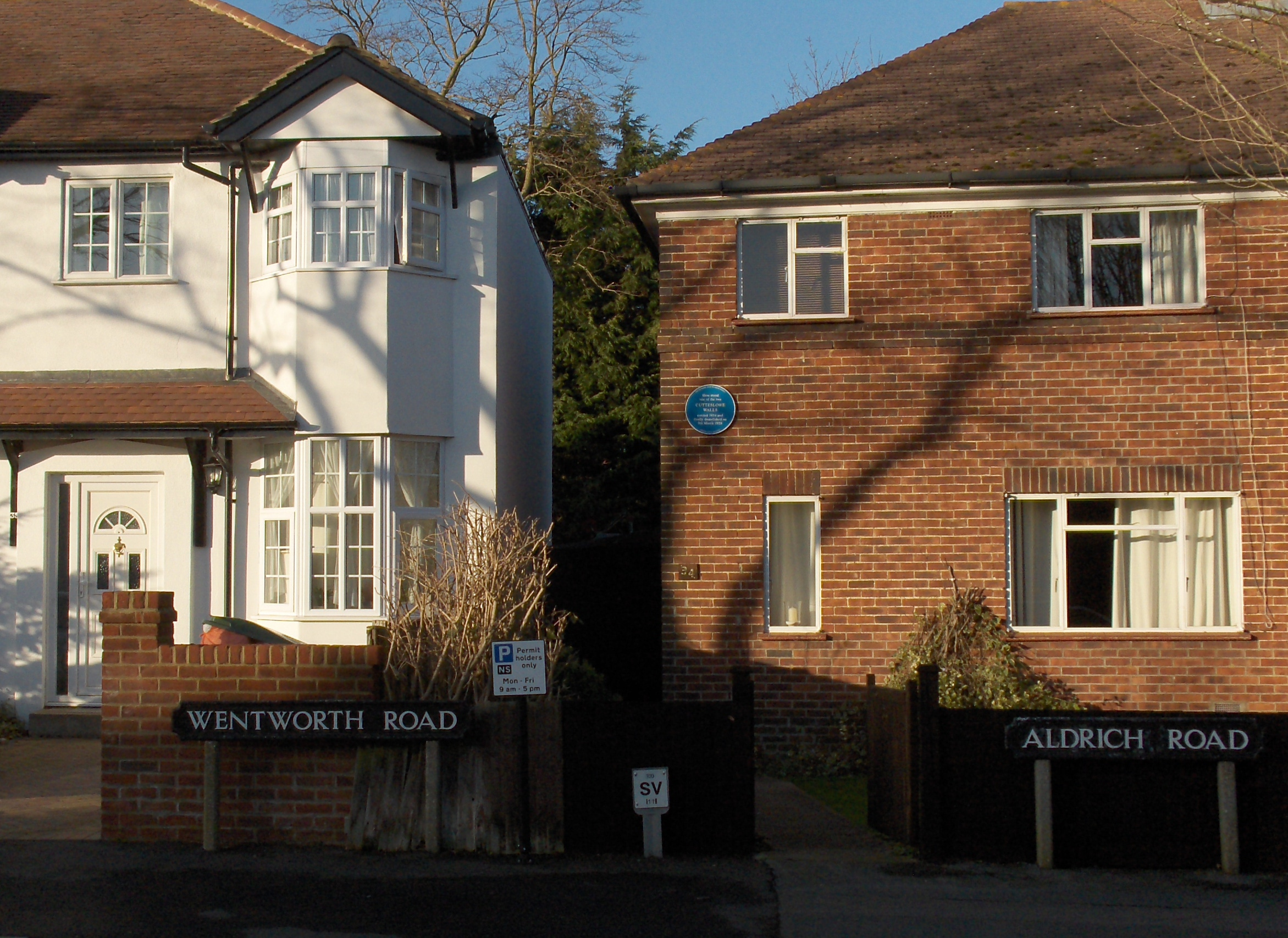
An Oxfordshire blue plaque marks the site of the former Cutteslowe Walls at the junction of Wentworth and Aldrich roads

Between 1934 and 1959 the Cutteslowe Walls excluded the council house tenants of the Cutteslowe Estate from an estate of private houses between them and Banbury Road. A private developer, Clive Saxton’s Urban Housing Company, built the private houses. The northern wall divided Wolsey Road from Carlton Road, the southern Aldrich Road from Wentworth Road. The walls were 9 ft (2.7 m) high and topped with spikes.

Soon after the Cuttleslowe Walls were built, a campaign was started to have them demolished, led by Communist Party of Great Britain (CPGB) activist Abraham Lazarus. Lazarus, who often went by the pseudonym "Bill Firestone", was already well known in the city of Oxford for having organised a rent strike on the Florence Park housing estate in Cowley, and chairing the 1934 Oxford Pressed Steel Company strike committee. On 11 May 1935, the Oxford branch of the CPGB and Lazarus gathered a crowd of over 2,000 people to call for the demolition of the Cuttleslowe Walls, and approached the wall wielding pickaxes. However, Oxford City Police intercepted the march and defended the walls.

During the Second World War, a tank whose crew was trying to return from Banbury Road to its base on Elsfield Way took a wrong turn and demolished one of the walls rather than turn back. The wall was rebuilt, but after escalating public protests and several unofficial attempts, the walls were eventually officially demolished after the council bought the land the walls stood on for £1,000.

A small fragment of the Aldrich Road wall existed in a private garden in Wentworth Road until the 1980s. A blue plaque was erected by the Oxfordshire Blue Plaques Board close to the site of the southern wall in 2006. Part of the wall was later taken to Oxford Town Hall where it is currently on display inside the Museum of Oxford's dedicated Cutteslowe Wall exhibit.

== Cutteslowe Bridge ==
The Cutteslowe estate was divided by a wall, but it was also separated from Cutteslowe Park by Oxford's northern bypass, the A40, a very busy dual carriageway. There is an underpass, but it was dark and frightening. The proposal for a bridge is said to have been from a class in Cutteslowe Primary School, but the proposal gathered momentum in part because Sustrans agreed that it would form an important link in the National Cycle Network, and in part because of the adoption of the campaign by Jackie Gray, the newly-elected LibDem Councillor. The work was carried out in 1998 by the Cutteslowe Bridge Project, and an application was made to the Millenium Commission which approved the bid.

== Governance ==
Cutteslowe was formerly a township in the parish of Woolvercot or Wolvercote, in 1858 Cutteslowe became a separate civil parish, on 1 April 1932 the parish was abolished to form Gosford and Water Eaton. In 1931 the parish had a population of 62. Cutteslowe is now an unparished area.

== Bibliography ==
- Collison, P (1963). The Cutteslowe Walls: A Study in Social Class. London: Faber and Faber. ISBN 0-571-05380-7.
- Crossley, Alan; Elrington, CR, eds. (1990). "Wolvercote: Manors and other estates". A History of the County of Oxford. Victoria County History. Vol. 12: Wootton Hundred (South) including Woodstock. London: Oxford University Press for the Institute of Historical Research. pp. 313–314. ISBN 978-0-19722-774-9.
- Gelling, Margaret (1954). Smith, AH (ed.). The Place-Names of Oxfordshire, Part II. Vol. XXIV. based on material collected by Doris Mary Stenton. Cambridge: Cambridge University Press for the English Place-Name Society.
- Meddick, Simon (2020). Red Lives: Communists and the Struggle for Socialism. Manifesto Press Cooperative Limited. p. 121. ISBN 978-1-907464-45-4.
