= Oxford Green Belt =

Oxford green belt showing extents, counties, and districts. Green belt County border District borders

The Oxford Green Belt is a green belt environmental and planning policy that regulates the rural space in Oxfordshire, within the South East region of England. It is centred on the city of Oxford, along with surrounding areas. Its core function is to control urban growth and development in and around the Oxford built-up area. It is managed by various local planning authorities, as it largely falls outside the jurisdiction of Oxford City Council.

== Geography ==
The green belt was first proposed in 1958, but only formalised and approved by central government in 1975. Land area taken up by the belt is 66,868 hectares (668.68 km^{2}; 258.18 sq mi), 0.5% of the total land area of England (2010). All the Oxfordshire district council areas contain some portion, and it extends for some five miles from the city's limits. The smallest tracts are within the city and West Oxfordshire districts, with South Oxfordshire containing the largest expanse.

Key suburbs, villages and towns within the realms of the green belt include Dean Court, Kennington, Kidlington, Wheatley, and Yarnton. Landscape features and facilities within include River Thames, Cherwell and their flood-meadows, RSPB Otmoor, Culham Science Centre, Cutteslowe Park and the mini railway attraction, Shotover Country Park, Farmoor Reservoir, and St Margaret's Church and well. Due to the belt lying wholly within the county border, responsibility and co-ordination lies with the district councils as these are the local planning authorities.

Following 2024 guidance from the central government to simplify local government, Oxford City Council brought forth plans to combine its government with surrounding villages into a larger council, called "Greater Oxford" which would encompass most of the green belt. In part, the proposal suggests this would make it possible to therefore build homes on "low quality" green belt land, citing traffic problems caused by people being forced to commute from outside Oxford City boundaries due to lack of housing in the city.

== See also ==
- Green belt (United Kingdom)
- Oxford Green Belt Way
