= Gosford (disambiguation) =

Gosford is a city in New South Wales, Australia.

Gosford may also refer to:

== Places ==
=== Australia ===
- City of Gosford, a former local government area of the Australian state of New South Wales

=== Canada ===
- Gosford River, a river of Portneuf, Quebec

=== United Kingdom ===
- Gosford, Oxfordshire, a hamlet in Oxfordshire, England
- Gosford and Water Eaton, a civil parish in Oxfordshire, England
- Gosford, Devon, a place in Devon, England
- Gosford, Herefordshire, a place in Herefordshire England

== Transportation ==
- Gosford railway station, in New South Wales, Australia

== See also ==
- Gosford Castle, County Armagh, Northern Ireland, United Kingdom
- Gosford House, East Lothian, Scotland, United Kingdom
- Earl of Gosford, a title in the Peerage of Ireland
- Gosford Park, a 2001 mystery comedy-drama film directed by Robert Altman
- Gosforth, an area of Newcastle upon Tyne, Tyne and Wear, England, United Kingdom
- Gosford Glyphs, a rock site with pseudo-Egyptian hieroglyphs in the Central Coast, New South Wales, Australia
