= Cassington Halt railway station =

Former railway station in Oxfordshire, England

Cassington Halt
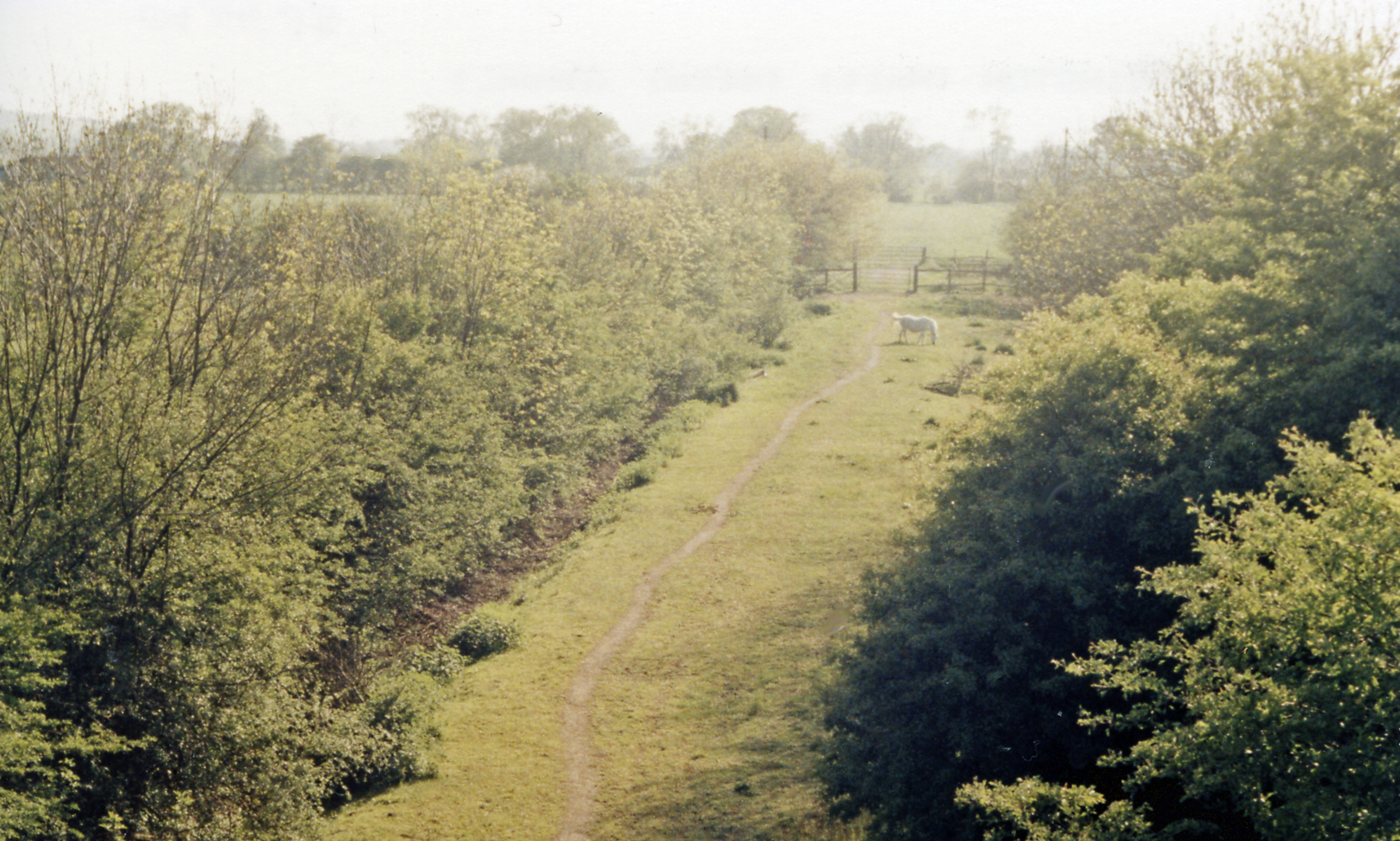
- Site of the halt in 1987.

General information
- Location: Cassington, West Oxfordshire; England
- Coordinates: 51.79038°N 1.33575°W
- Grid reference: SP458104
- Platforms: 1

Other information
- Status: Disused

History
- Original company: Great Western Railway
- Post-grouping: Great Western Railway

Key dates
- 9 March 1936: Station opens
- c. 1948: Resited
- 1962: Station closes
Location

Cassington Halt was a single platform halt opened by the Great Western Railway on 9 March 1936 on the Oxford, Witney and Fairford Railway to serve the village of Cassington, Oxfordshire, just south of the A40.

== History ==
Cassington Halt was opened by the Great Western Railway on 9 March 1936. It had a single 100-foot (30 m) platform and was unstaffed. As the platform could not accommodate a full train, passengers alighting here had to travel in the last coach (in the case of Down trains) or the front coach (in the case of Up trains). The halt came under the responsibility of the stationmaster at Eynsham and passengers joining trains had to be booked at either Witney or Oxford. An instruction was issued to guards to travel in the front coach of Up services between Eynsham and Yarnton so that fares could be collected from passengers joining the train.

The halt, which was the penultimate station to be opened on the Witney Railway, had a precast concrete platform on which was a traditional wooden shelter with a saw-tooth awning. It was lit by oil lamps which were trimmed and extinguished by the guards of trains calling at the halt. The station was located on the south side of the A40 road which was carried over the line by a traditional Cotswold stone bridge. Following the Second World War, the halt was resited to the north side of the A40 bridge to allow passengers to reach it via a private road rather than having to cross the busy road.

British Railways closed the station on 18 June 1962. Full closure of the line did not come until Monday 2 November 1970.

Preceding station	Disused railways	Following station
Eynsham; Line and station closed	Great Western Railway; Witney Railway	Yarnton; Line and station closed

== Present day ==
The trackbed has been concreted over to provide an access road to the sand extraction sites in the area.

== Reopening the railway ==
There is a strong case to reopen the railway given the severe traffic congestion on the roads to and from Oxford.
