= Cutteslowe Park, Oxford =

Public park in England

Coordinates: 51.78924°N 1.25879°W

Wild Iris, Cutteslowe Park

Cutteslowe Park is a public park in Cutteslowe in North Oxford, England. It was established in 1936 when Oxford City Council acquired land of the former Cutteslowe Manor farm, whose house still stands at its centre. More land was acquired in 1937 and 1938, including purchases from the Dean and Chaplain of Westminster. The original manor house dates from at least the mid-17th century, being shown on a 1670s map by Michael Burghers.

To the north and east the park is bounded by working farmland, while it is bordered to the west by 1960s–70s housing developments of Cutteslowe.

Sunnymead Park, just inside the north-east arc of the Oxford ring-road, was once a council tip which was covered and reconditioned from the 1980s onwards. In 2006 Oxford City Council united the two parks, which now form a single administrative unit called Cutteslowe and Sunnymead Park.

== Overview ==
Cutteslowe Park has herbaceous borders and despite disease damage during 2009-2012 there remained many horse chestnut trees, until most of them were removed in 2017 by the City Council's order owing to concerns that after a disease their branches could possibly become fragile and pose danger. Until further disease management in 2010 and early 2011, the park also contained some superb examples of White Willow trees.

The park has a children's play area, crazy golf, duck pond, beach volleyball court, and tennis courts. There is a miniature steam railway run by the City of Oxford Society of Model Engineers.

Purchases of farmland by the City Council in 1937-8 gave the park a large recreation ground on its east side, used for football and rugby in autumn and winter. The increased size of the park enabled the creation of a "Peace Mile": a running circuit that encompasses most of the perimeter of the park, inaugurated in 1985 by world harmony advocate Sri Chinmoy and the then Mayor of Oxford. The peace mile is popular with runners and in summer short running races are held around it by Sri Chinmoy Athletics Club. The park has also been the location of the Oxford parkrun since November 2011.

A public footpath cuts diagonally across the lower recreation ground, originating on the line of an ancient drovers' path, part of which is still visible at its southern extent for about 100 yards (91 m), bisected by the A40, the Northern Bypass. This linked Water Eaton and Oxford, and a short section of this path (at the bottom of Harpes Road, Islip Road and Victoria Road in North Oxford) is called Water Eaton Road. Further south this becomes a footpath and cycle route from Lonsdale Road, and it emerges near the Cherwell School.

== Community interest ==
In the 1980s the condition of the former council dump within the ring-road inspired the creation of a ‘Cutteslowe/Sunnymead Group’ of local residents, which worked with the City Council to clear fly-tipping, create a sports zone, improve wildlife areas and paths and generally transform the site. On 21 February 2007 the Friends of Cutteslowe and Sunnymead Park was formed "to promote the access, positive management and enhancement of the park and its facilities for the benefit of the local community and wider general public".

== Wind turbine proposal ==
In November 2009 a city council proposal to lease an area of the park to an energy management company for the construction of a wind turbine was challenged by the Friends, who felt that fuller community engagement should first be sought. Eventually, the proposal was not implemented because of concerns about impacts on RAF flying on the approach to Brize Norton airbase, to the west of the area.
