= Witney railway station (goods) =

Former railway station in Oxfordshire, England

Witney (Goods)

General information
- Location: Witney, West Oxfordshire; England
- Coordinates: 51.77722°N 1.48056°W
- Grid reference: SP357090
- Platforms: 2

Other information
- Status: Disused

History
- Original company: Witney Railway
- Pre-grouping: Great Western Railway
- Post-grouping: Great Western Railway

Key dates
- 14 November 1861: Station opens
- 15 January 1873: Station closes to passengers
- 2 November 1970: Station closes to goods
Location

Witney goods station served the Oxfordshire town of Witney on the Oxford, Witney and Fairford Railway. It consisted of seven sidings, a goods shed, a wooden parcel office and a cattle dock. It also had an engine shed, which was demolished early in the twentieth century. Following the opening of the East Gloucestershire Railway in 1873, the station became a goods depot, with passengers using the second station situated to the south. The original station remained open to goods traffic until 1970.

== History ==
The station was opened by the Witney Railway on 4 November 1861 as the western terminus of its line from Yarnton. A single platform was provided in addition to a run-around loop and a carriage siding. A large stone goods shed was served by two sidings, one of which was accessed by a short spur from a wagon turntable. The station building was a small weather-boarded structure with a hipped roof and a platform canopy. At the end of the line stood a single-road engine shed and water tank. The shed, which lost its locomotive allocation when the new Witney station opened, was demolished during November 1905 after having been used for storage purposes.

When the East Gloucestershire Railway opened an extension of the line in 1873, a new passenger station was constructed on a different site to the south, opening on 15 January 1873. This left the old station on a spur line, and it became the town's goods depot on the same date. The directors of the Witney Railway had first been opposed to the downgrading of their station but the Great Western Railway, which was to work the new line, insisted that agreement would need to be reached between the East Gloucestershire and the Witney as to a new station which would be operated on a joint basis. Following its conversion to a goods depot, the station's basic layout remained essentially intact, so much so that it continued to resemble the old passenger station. The Great Western made several later additions including extensions to the goods shed, a stable block to accommodate the shunting and dray horses, a wood store, a corrugated iron warehouse and a stationmaster's house. The house is said to be the last to have been constructed by the Great Western before the Second World War. The station canopy was boarded in to increase the storage space for parcels.

The station remained busy right up until the later years of the line. In 1957, over 44,000 tons of goods were handled as well as 66,000 parcels. 99,000 bales of blankets were dispatched by rail every year, the main source of traffic. After the withdrawal of services on the East Gloucestershire Railway, British Railways began deliberately running down the Witney Railway to ensure its closure; it offered the Witney Blanket Company a cheaper rate if it agreed to transfer its goods to road. Staff at the station was reduced to a single person as the service was cut back to a coal train on Mondays, Wednesdays and Fridays and subsequently only Tuesdays and Fridays. The sidings in the goods yard were lifted in Winter 1968, leaving the large goods shed and siding to fall derelict. The remaining traffic was dealt with behind the station building or in the coal sidings.

Witney goods station was closed along with the Witney Railway on 2 November 1970. The last train to traverse the line was the "Witney Wanderer" on 31 October, but this did not actually enter the Witney terminus.

Preceding station	Disused railways	Following station
Terminus	Great Western Railway; Witney Railway	South Leigh; Line and station closed

== Present day ==
The station building survived into the 1980s engulfed by an industrial estate constructed on the site of the former goods depot. It was accidentally damaged in 1980 when a chimney stack was brought down after a tractor-mounted loading shovel became caught up in an electric cable attached to the chimney. The station building was subsequently moved to Wallingford on the Cholsey and Wallingford Railway. The goods yard, weighbridge and parcel shed continued to be used by Marriott's coal merchants until May 1995 when they were demolished and subsequently replaced by a Sainsbury's supermarket.

The former goods shed was converted into a club known as "Sidings" which used a 1955 British Railways Mark 1 coach as its entrance. Both the goods shed and the stationmaster's house remain.
