= Yarnton railway station =

Former railway station in Oxfordshire, England

Yarnton
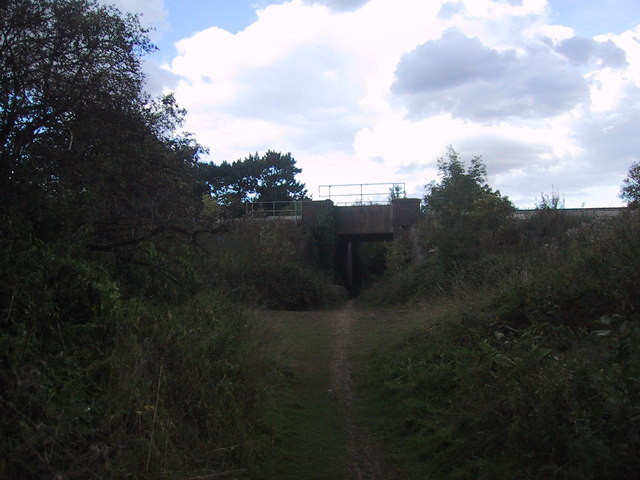
- The footpath near the site of the station in 2013

General information
- Location: Yarnton, Cherwell; England
- Coordinates: 51.79917°N 1.31357°W
- Grid reference: SP473114
- Platforms: 3

Other information
- Status: Disused

History
- Original company: West Midland Railway
- Pre-grouping: Great Western Railway
- Post-grouping: Great Western Railway

Key dates
- 14 November 1861: Station opens
- 18 June 1962: Station closes
Location

Yarnton Junction was a three-platform station serving the village of Yarnton, Oxfordshire. It was built in 1861 at the junction of the Oxford, Worcester and Wolverhampton Railway and Witney Railway, north of Oxford. British Railways closed the station to passengers in 1962 and it was demolished c. 1965.

== History ==
A station was not provided at Yarnton either upon the opening of the Oxford, Worcester and Wolverhampton Railway (OW&WR) between Evesham and Wolvercot on 4 June 1853 or the opening of the Buckinghamshire Junction Railway (BJR) (known as the Yarnton Loop) on 1 April 1854. The 1-mile-49-chain (2.6 km) double-track BJR enabled through services between Euston and Wolverhampton Low Level via the OW&WR and the line to Bletchley, worked by the OW&WR as far as Handborough and also between Dudley and Wolverhampton via the South Staffordshire curve south of Tipton to run into Wolverhampton High Level. Handborough was the interchange for the new line where connecting trains ran to and from Oxford General.

On 13 November 1861, the Witney Railway opened a 8-mile-13-chain (13.1 km) branch line from the OW&WR at Yarnton to Witney. By this time, the OW&WR had merged with the Worcester and Hereford Railway and the Newport, Abergavenny and Hereford Railway to become, as of 14 June 1860, the West Midland Railway (WMR). It was leased by the Great Western Railway for 999 years from 30 May 1861 and was taken over by this company from 1 August 1863. According to Sir Charles Fox, the engineer engaged by the Witney Railway to survey their line, the OW&WR had given an undertaking to build a station at Yarnton and to stop their trains to connect with services on the branch line. It was proposed that all Witney services would terminate at Yarnton, where "a fine new inter-change station" would be built providing connections to Worcester, Oxford, Witney and Euston. However, after the WMR had settled its differences with the Great Western and agreed to be leased by it in 1861, the through service from Worcester to Euston had been withdrawn from September and there was no need for a grand station at Yarnton.

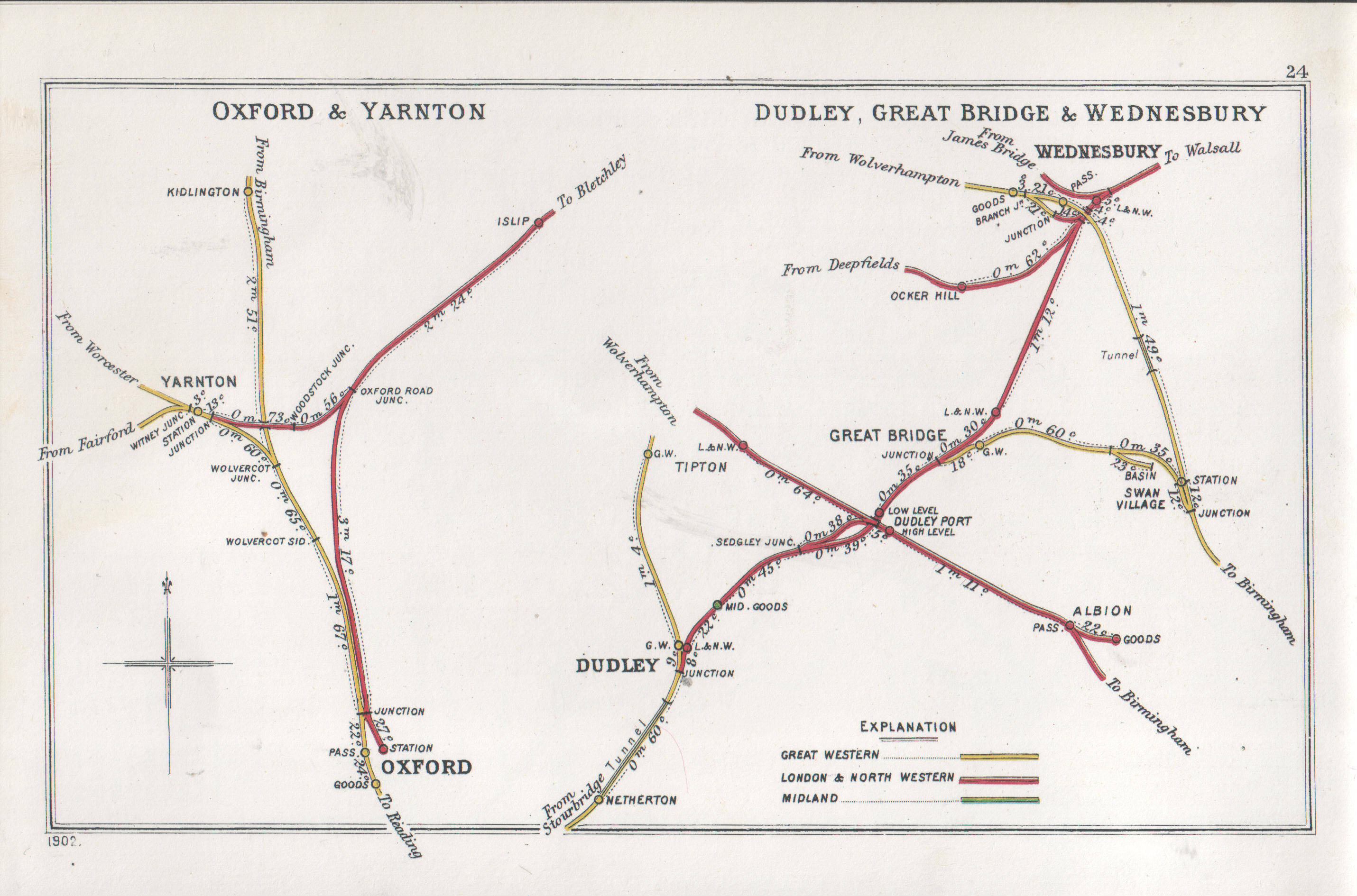
A 1902 Railway Clearing House map of railways in the vicinity of Yarnton

The station was therefore incomplete when opened on 14 November 1861 and it was not until Summer 1863 when its three platform faces and run-round loop for branch services were finished. There was no goods yard or loading facilities, although there were two sidings on the Up side which served a WMR "ballast field", which may have been used for the construction of the Witney Railway. The station building itself was a large two-storey Gothic structure to the north of the Up platform. An ornate waiting shelter with seats on both sides stood on the down platform which was built as an island with tracks on both sides. The lack of structures on the Up platform may be explained by the fact that the WMR had intended to provide two island platforms with four faces. The main station building was demolished not long after opening and a basic wooden hut was thereafter constructed on the Up platform, adjacent to which was a graceful wood-and-iron gentlemen's urinal. To the south of the platforms, the Yarnton Loop diverged eastwards to join the L&NWR at Oxford Road junction. There was no road access to the station and passengers reached it via a long unlit footpath close to the graveyard of St Bartholomew's Church.

A house was provided for the railwayman in charge of the station; it was unusual in that it was built right next to the main line tracks. The house was demolished in c. 1935. During the Second World War, works were carried out at Yarnton Junction to increase its capacity to deal with wartime traffic. A marshalling yard comprising nine long sidings was brought into use on 20 August 1940 to handle freight transfers; it was retained after the war to re-marshal ironstone trains from the East Midlands via Bletchley, eventually closing on 6 July 1966. The yard had a large turntable and shunters' accommodation.

On 18 June 1962 British Railways withdrew passenger services from the Fairford branch and closed Yarnton station. Demolition of the station buildings followed in c. 1965. The line from Yarnton to Witney remained open for goods traffic until 2 November 1970. The connection at Yarnton with the main line was taken out shortly after final closure. The Yarnton Loop had closed earlier on 8 November 1965.

== Signalling ==
Two signal boxes were in use at Yarnton by the 1880s. The first, Yarnton Witney Junction Box, controlled the Yarnton Loop and the junction between the OW&WR and the Witney Railway. This was a 50-lever "pedestal" box situated to the southern end of the Down platform, to the left of which were nine long sidings brought into use on 20 August 1940 and which were retained after the war to re-marshal ironstone trains from the East Midlands via Bletchley, eventually closing on 6 July 1966. The second was Yarnton Oxford Road Junction.

These were replaced on 13 June 1909 by a single box. This was a power signalling box which did not rely on the signalman's muscle power to operate points and signals. 120 V motors were used with signals being held in the "off" position by electromagnets. 50 miniature levers were provided in the box to operate the points and signals. The frame was constructed by McKenzie and Holland at a cost of £2,800. This was the second power signalling installation on the GWR and lasted for twenty years until replaced by a conventional mechanical signalling system on 30 July 1929. The signal box finally closed on 28 March 1971.

== Routes ==
Preceding station	Historical railways	Following station
Handborough; Line and station open	Great Western Railway; Oxford, Worcester and Wolverhampton Railway	Wolvercot Platform; Line open, station closed
	Disused railways	
Cassington Halt; Line and station closed	Great Western Railway; Witney Railway	Wolvercot Platform; Line open, station closed

== Present day ==
Yarnton station has been entirely swept away and no trace remains; the trackbed of the Witney Railway is nevertheless traceable as far as Cassington Halt. At Yarnton Junction, the only remaining relic is the turntable pit. The area to the south of the line at this point is used for gravel extraction.

The former OW&WR line, now partially incorporated in the Cotswold Line, was reduced to single track between Wolvercote Junction and Ascott-under-Wychwood on 29 November 1971 when the Up line was taken out of use. The second track was reinstated between Ascott-under-Wychwood and Charlbury on 6 June 2011.

== Railway reopening ==
In February 2015, the Witney Oxford Transport Group proposed the reopening of the station as an alternative to improvements to the A40 road proposed by Oxfordshire County Council.

There is a strong case to reopen the railway given the severe traffic congestion on the roads to and from Oxford.
