= Eynsham railway station =

Former railway station in Oxfordshire, England

Eynsham
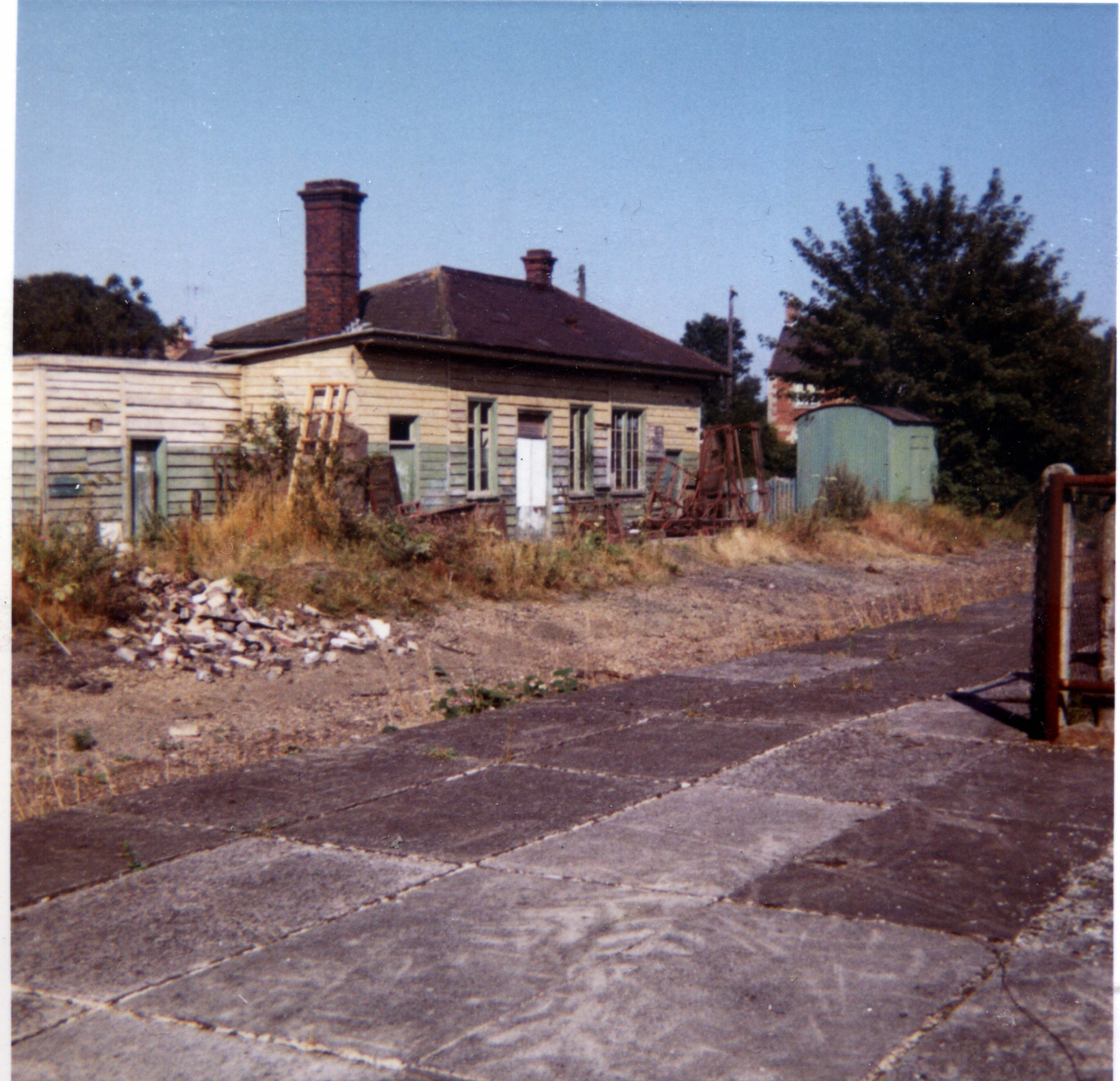
- Eynsham Station in 1972 after closure

General information
- Location: Eynsham, West Oxfordshire; England
- Coordinates: 51.77644°N 1.37874°W
- Grid reference: SP430088
- Platforms: 2

Other information
- Status: Disused

History
- Original company: Witney Railway
- Pre-grouping: Great Western Railway
- Post-grouping: Great Western Railway

Key dates
- 14 November 1861: Opened
- May 1944: Passing loop and second platform built
- 18 June 1962: Closed to passengers
- 26 April 1965: Closed to goods
- 2 November 1970: Line closed
Location

Eynsham railway station served the Oxfordshire town of Eynsham and the Eynsham Sugar Beet Factory on the Oxford, Witney and Fairford Railway between Oxford and Witney.

== History ==
The Witney Railway, including Eynsham station, opened on 14 November 1861. It was originally a single platform station, but was the Witney Railway's principal intermediate station. The contractor who built the line, Malachi Bartlett, erected single-storey wooden station building in the same style as that at the line's other stations at South Leigh and Witney. It was weather-boarded and had a Welsh slate hip roof with a shallow pitch and broad eaves. In 1892 the Great Western Railway added a signal box next to the station building, very similar to that at Fairford. A large Cotswold stone goods shed stood at the Fairford end of the platform, a few yards from the signal box.

The station had a goods yard that handled significant goods traffic. It had two sidings (later three) and a 1 1/2-ton crane. The largest traffic was coal, for which the third siding was added in 1878 north of the goods shed. In its heyday in the 1920s, Eynsham station was handling up to 12,000 tons of freight a year, while passenger bookings averaged 14,000 annually over the same period. There was a large sugar beet factory 40 chains (800 m) east of the station that had three sidings. It opened in 1927 but was not successful and closed in 1931. In the Second World War the factory became a Royal Army Service Corps depot. Afterwards it became a storage depot for the Colonial Development Corporation, then the premises of J. Harding (Eynsham) and finally a depot for British Leyland.

In May 1944 a 22-chain (440 m) passing loop and second platform and platform were added to the station, increasing capacity on the single-track line for troop and armaments movements in preparation for the Normandy landings. The loop and platform were on the Down side, and the original became the Up platform. The station also handled agricultural traffic and wagonloads of bones for the local glue factory. At the Oxford end of the station was a level crossing where the line crossed the Stanton Harcourt road.

=== Armed robbery ===
In the early hours of Monday 5 December 1927 two armed and masked thieves, Frederick Browne and William Kennedy, held up the station. Browne had formerly lived in Eynsham and was on the run from the police after having shot dead a policeman, PC George Gutteridge, in Essex in September 1927; Kennedy was also wanted, as Browne's accomplice. Browne drove along the line from near South Leigh to Eynsham. There a porter, Frederick Castle, arrived by motorcycle, discovered the thieves and challenged them. They held Castle at gunpoint and tied him to a chair in the stationmaster's office. Castle had no key to the safe so Browne and Kennedy tried unsuccessfully to detach it from the floor. They moved Castle from the stationmaster's office to the building housing the ground frame, then escaped with tobacco and the stationmaster's typewriter. Both were arrested the following January and, after trial at the Old Bailey, were hanged in May 1928 for the murder of PC Gutteridge.

=== Closure ===
The Western Region of British Railways closed the station to passenger traffic on 18 June 1962 and to goods on 26 April 1965. An enthusiasts' special organised by the Locomotive Club of Great Britain called at the closed station in April 1970. BR closed the line to goods traffic on Monday 2 November 1970, after which the local council asphalted over the level crossing "with almost indecent haste".

| Preceding station | Disused railways | Following station |
|---|---|---|
| South Leigh; Line and station closed | Great Western Railway; Witney Railway | Cassington Halt; Line and station closed |

== The site since closure ==
A section of the trackbed between Eynsham and the Siemens plant on Wharf Road has been converted into the B4449 road to Stanton Harcourt and Standlake. Eynsham station site is now covered by buildings and an access road to an office building known as "Station Point", having previously been the site of Oxford Instruments headquarters opened in 1984. The 1944 sectional platform was dismantled in 1984 by the Great Western Society and is now at Didcot Railway Centre. The goods shed survived until 1987 as a scenery workshop for the Oxford Playhouse.

The station has been proposed for reopening or a site to the north of the town as part of a project to restore the railway to Carterton via Witney, as well as to serve a new proposed settlement called Salt Cross Garden Village. The new site would also be next to a proposed park and ride site.
