= Oxford Green Belt Way =

Long-distance path in Oxfordshire, England

The Oxford Green Belt through which the route travells

The Oxford Green Belt Way is a long-distance path in Oxfordshire, England. It follows a circular route of 50 miles (80 km) through the Oxford Green Belt surrounding the city of Oxford. The route was devised in 2007 to mark the Campaign to Protect Rural England 75th anniversary and to highlight the importance of the Green Belt. On its launch each mile on the route marks one year since the designation of the greenbelts in 1956.

In the east, the path follows the East Oxford Limestone Heights, passing Shotover, Horspath and Garsington. It then passes through the park of Nuneham House and to the north of Culham, to reach the River Thames at Abingdon. It uses the Thames Path to reach Radley, then heads in a northwesterly direction to Boars Hill and Cumnor. It reaches the Thames again by Farmoor Reservoir and Swinford, then heads east to Godstow and Wolvercote on the northern edge of Oxford. It uses the Oxford Canal Walk for 4 miles north to Shipton-on-Cherwell, then heads south-east across the water meadows of the River Cherwell to Hampton Poyle and Gosford. The path then crosses the corallian limestone hills of Elsfield and Beckley to return to Shotover.
