= Oxford Zoo =

- Interactive map of Oxford Zoo
- 51.8125°N 1.27719°W
- Date opened: 1931
- Date closed: 1937
- Location: Kidlington, Oxfordshire, United Kingdom

Oxford Zoo was a zoo in Kidlington, just north of the city of Oxford in Oxfordshire, England. It was opened in 1931 and closed in 1937.

Animals at the zoo included an American brown bear, a bison, a camel, an elephant, two leopards, three lions, two llamas, two polar bears, and wolves. On closure, many of the animals were moved to Dudley Zoo.

The Thames Valley Police headquarters now occupies the location of the zoo. In 2018, an elephant sculpture was installed at a roundabout at the southern end of Kidlington to commemorate the zoo and an elephant called Rosie who was a major attraction at the zoo, commissioned by Kidlington Parish Council and Cherwell District Council.

== See also ==
- List of former zoos and aquariums
