= South Leigh =

Village in Oxfordshire, England

Coordinates: 51.777°N 1.433°W

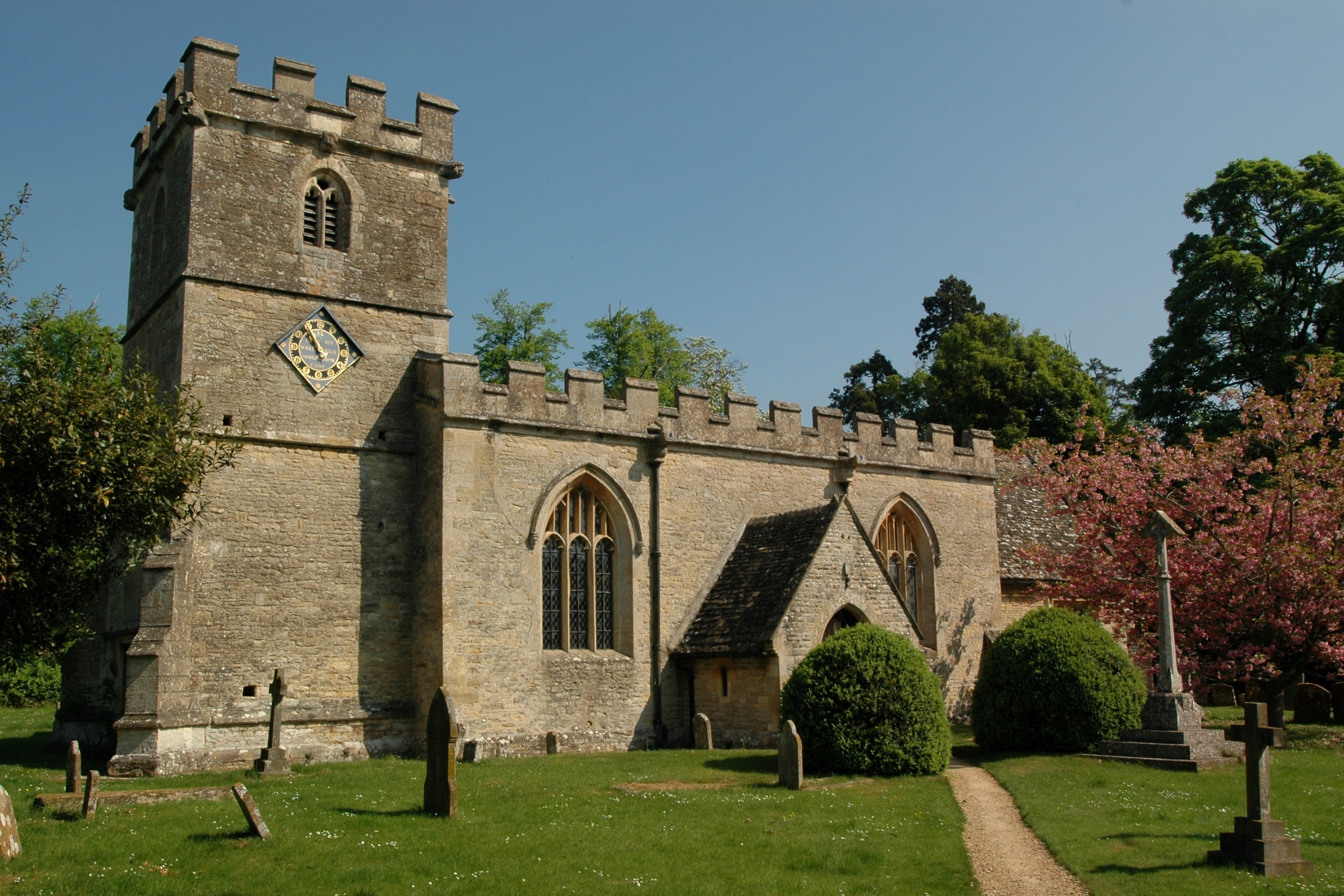
- St. James the Great parish church

- Location within Oxfordshire
- Population: 336 (2011 Census)
- OS grid reference: SP3908
- Civil parish: South Leigh and High Cogges
- District: West Oxfordshire
- Shire county: Oxfordshire
- Region: South East
- Country: England
- Sovereign state: United Kingdom
- Post town: Witney
- Postcode district: OX29
- Dialling code: 01993
- Police: Thames Valley
- Fire: Oxfordshire
- Ambulance: South Central
- UK Parliament: Bicester and Woodstock
- Website: South Leigh

There is also a Southleigh in Devon.

South Leigh is a village in the civil parish of South Leigh and High Cogges, in the West Oxfordshire district, in Oxfordshire, England, on Limb Brook, a small tributary of the River Thames, about 2 1/2 miles (4 km) east of Witney. The 2011 Census recorded the parish's population as 336. On 1 January 2024 the parish was renamed from "South Leigh" to "South Leigh and High Cogges".

== Manor ==
South Leigh was not mentioned in the Domesday Book of 1086, but was recorded in 1190 as Stanton Lega. The manor house was built in the second half of the 16th century. It is now called Church Farm House. In the middle of the 17th century William Gore acquired the manor. The Gores consolidated South Leigh as a separate estate within Stanton Harcourt parish, but this led to a series of disputes over landholdings intermixed between the two. When Stanton Harcourt's common lands were being enclosed in 1773, its enclosure commissioners suggested promoting a single Parliamentary bill to enclose both estates. Edward Gore and his tenants in South Leigh disagreed due to the unresolved boundary disputes and consequent disagreement over what lands would be allotted to whom under the enclosure award. Instead Stanton Harcourt's enclosure commissioners were empowered to settle a definitive boundary between the two estates.

== Church and chapel ==
=== Church of England ===
The Church of England parish church of Saint James the Great began as a chapel of the parish of Stanton Harcourt, and remained so until 1868. The oldest parts of the church building date from the latter part of the 12th century. The present chancel arch was built about 1300, the tower arch was built during the 14th century and the south doorway of the nave dates from about 1400. The church building was extensively altered in the 15th century: the north aisle and chapel were added, the bell tower was completed, and new windows were inserted in the south and east walls of the chancel.

In 1871–72 the architect Ewan Christian restored the chancel and C. C. Rolfe began restoring the nave. Rolfe's cousin H. W. Moore completed the nave restoration in 1887–88. During the restoration extensive 15th century wall paintings were discovered. They include a Doom painting over the chancel arch, the seven deadly sins, Saint Michael weighing souls, the Virgin Mary (originally part of an Annunciation scene) and a rare painting of Saint Clement. Burlison and Grylls heavily restored the paintings, re-drawing the weighing of souls at twice its original size. St. James' tower has a ring of eight bells, all of which were cast by Mears & Stainbank of the Whitechapel Bell Foundry in 1907. The church also has a Sanctus bell cast by an unknown founder in about 1399.

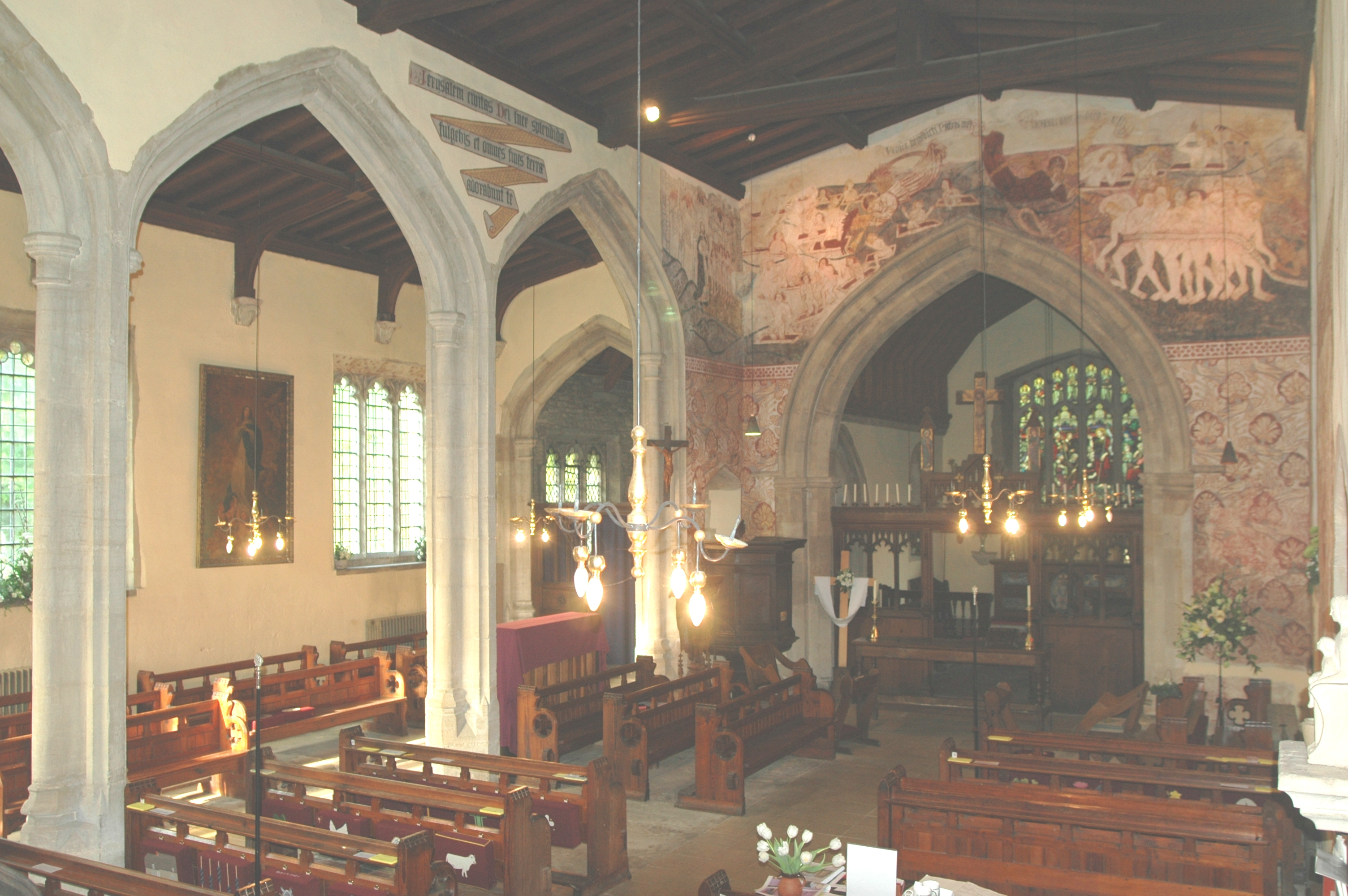
Interior of St. James' the Great parish church, showing the chancel arch, Doom painting and part of the north arcade

=== Methodist ===
John Wesley preached in South Leigh in 1771. A small Methodist congregation was established in the village by 1817, and met in private houses until it had its own chapel built in 1876. By 1968 the chapel was used for worship only once a month, and in 1969 it was sold. It is now a private house.

== Economic and social history ==
Sometime after 1773 the Gores sold South Leigh estate to John Sibthorp. In 1792, a generation after Stanton Harcourt's enclosure, two thirds of South Leigh's land remained unenclosed. Sibthorp obtained an Act of Parliament that led to their enclosure in 1793. About 1,663 acres (673 ha) were enclosed, of which the commissioners awarded 1,233 acres (499 ha) to Sibthorp. South Leigh had coppices of pollarded elms to supply wood for various purposes. Between 1793 and 1795 Sibthorp had more than 3,000 trees around the estate, most of them pollarded elms, felled to make fences for the new enclosures. The Sibthorps felled large timber trees as well as wood, and early in the 19th century there were two major auctions of ash, elm and oak. Sibthorp wrote that in the first ten months after the enclosure award:

I have worked up between 2000 and 3000 trees to posts and rails for my enclosure, besides a great quantity of timber used in the general repair of the farmhouses and cottage. I have quicked near upon 100 furlongs and fenced with posts and rails one-half of it. Gates and gateposts on the enclosures. I had three teams of horses constantly employed during the summer, yet unequal to my work.

The Witney Railway was built through the parish and opened in 1861. South Leigh railway station served the parish until 1962, when British Railways withdrew passenger services from the line. BR closed the line to freight traffic in 1970 and the track was dismantled sometime thereafter. St. James' National School was built in 1871 and was reorganised as a junior school in 1931. Declining numbers of pupils led to the school being closed down in 1946. The former school building is now the village hall. St. James' College next to the parish church was founded in 1875 as a preparatory school. By 1923 it had become an orphanage, Holyrood Hospital.

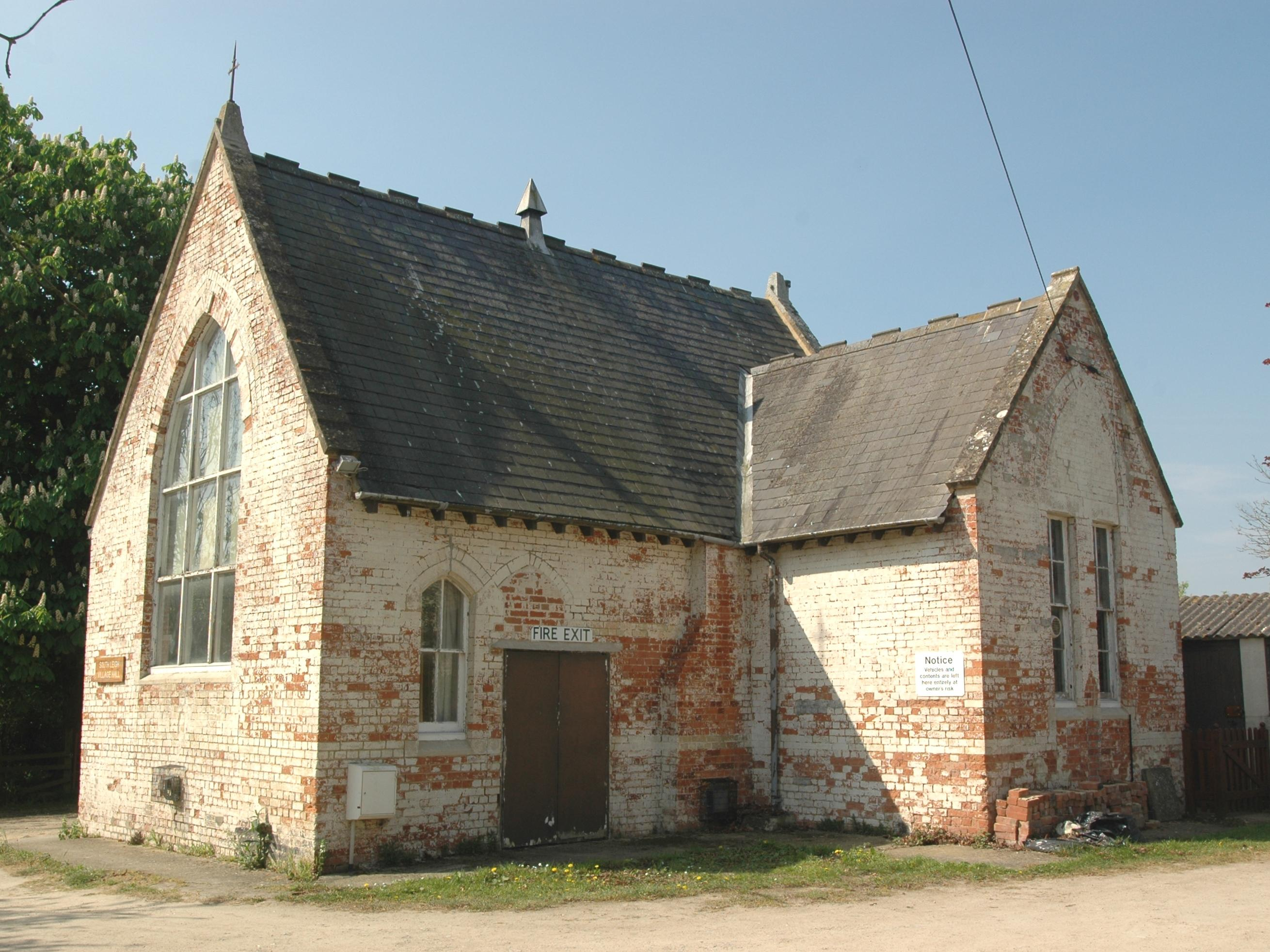
The village hall, formerly the National School

== Mason Arms ==
The Mason Arms, a Grade II listed building which may date to the early 1700s, was named after the Mason family who were once a major landowner in the area. It was originally known as Ivy Farm. It seems to have started as a pub around 1879, but also continued as a dairy and wheat farm. The pub's first known landlord was Thomas Harris, who was then followed by Mark Hopkins. His son, Albert Thomas Hopkins (b.1880) and his wife Mary took over the pub in the 1920s. Hopkins ran both the pub and the farm, as well as a business as a coal merchant. Their niece, Dosh Murray, went to live with them in the pub in the late 1920s, and has provided some information on the Hopkins’ time there, including the fact that the pub did not serve food, though it did provide accommodation. The pub's beer came from the Garne's brewery in Burford. Albert Hopkins died in 1963, and the pub was run for a period by Joan Lee. She was succeeded by Tom Litt. After several months of renovation, during which the bar was located in a barn in the grounds, Litt re-opened the pub on 15 July 1964, with thirteen customers for dinner. In 1974, he opened a micro-brewery at the pub, producing 72 gallons per week of Sowlye Ale. In May 1982, Don Franks took over the pub and the micro-brewery was closed.

The pub's landlord from 1995 was Gerry Stonhill. He ran it as a gastropub that was commended by Raymond Blanc and Marco Pierre White. The Mason Arms had a number of celebrity customers and its facilities included a helipad for customers. Michael Winner is said to have called it the tackiest pub in Britain. Stonhill allowed his customers to smoke inside the pub in defiance of the ban on smoking in public buildings. In April 2008, he was successfully prosecuted and ordered to pay five separate fines and prosecution costs totalling £5,750. After Stonhill's departure in 2013, the pub was bought by a property developer and lay empty for a number of years. In 2015, it was listed as an asset of community value under the Localism Act 2011. The Mason Arms was subsequently bought by Justin and Charlotte Salisbury, and re-opened in 2017 as one of their Artist-in-Residence boutique hotels.

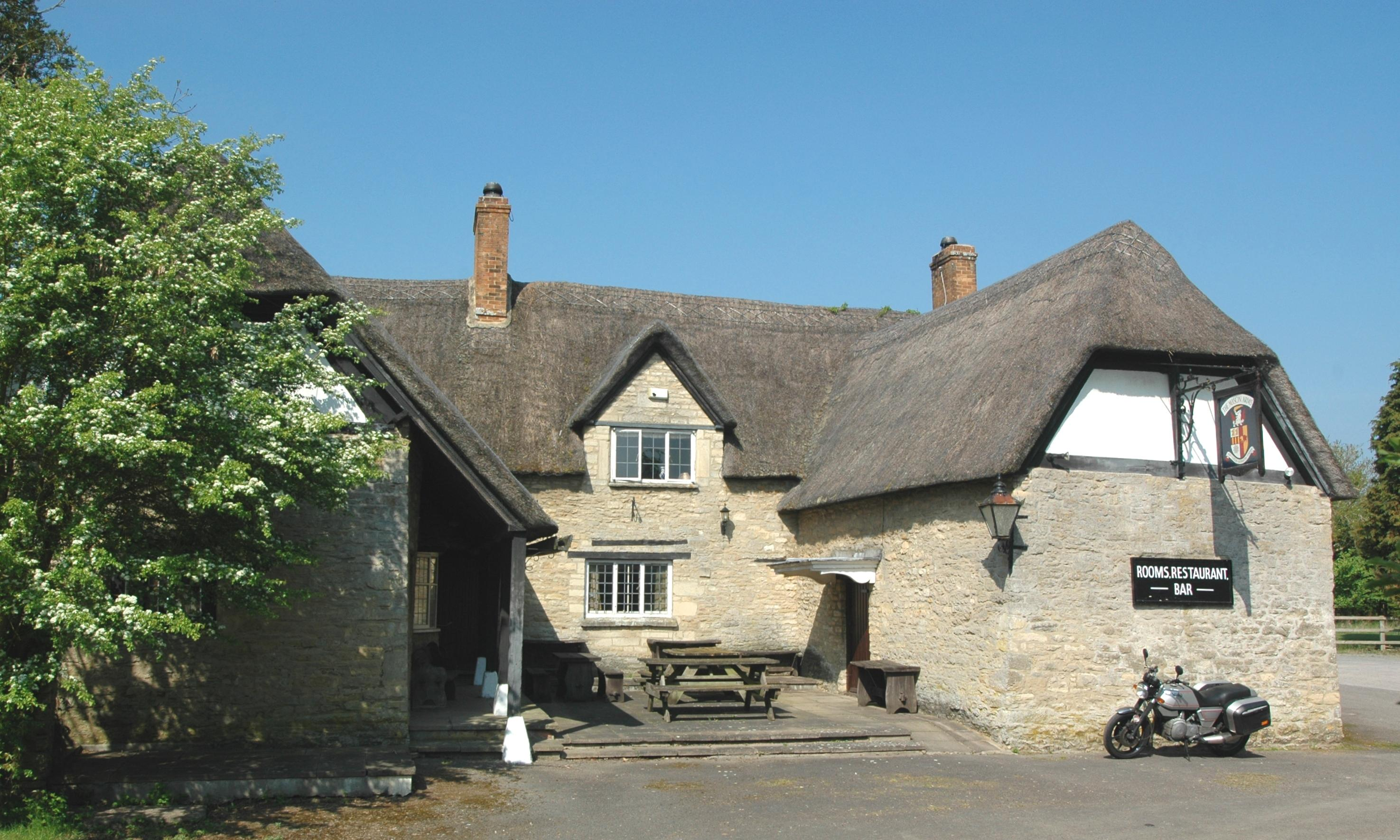
The Mason Arms

== Notable residents ==
South Leigh has had a number of celebrity residents, including the entrepreneur Richard Branson, the comedian Harry Locke and the poet Dylan Thomas. Thomas lived in the village from August 1947 to May 1949, and continued work there on Under Milk Wood. The radio journalist, Colin Edwards, came to South Leigh in the late 1970s and interviewed a number of residents about Thomas’ time amongst them. These interviews have been transcribed, edited and published. An Oxfordshire Blue Plaque to Dylan Thomas was unveiled at South Leigh on 7 June 2025.

== Sources and further reading ==
- Broome, Phyllis (1997, 1998) South Leigh Remembered, Broome
- Bruce, M.R. (1972). "An Oxfordshire enclosure 1791–94". Top. Oxon. 18.
- Crossley, Alan; Elrington, C.R., eds. (1990). A History of the County of Oxford. Victoria County History. Vol. 12: Wootton Hundred (South) including Woodstock. London: Oxford University Press for the Institute of Historical Research. pp. 238–253. ISBN 978-0-19722-774-9.
- Emery, Frank (1974). The Oxfordshire Landscape. The Making of the English Landscape. London: Hodder & Stoughton. pp. 88, 143, 187. ISBN 0-340-04301-6.
- Long, E.T. (1972). "Medieval Wall Paintings in Oxfordshire Churches" (PDF). Oxoniensia. XXXVII. Oxfordshire Architectural and Historical Society: 86–108. ISSN 0308-5562.
- Sherwood, Jennifer; Pevsner, Nikolaus (1974). Oxfordshire. The Buildings of England. Harmondsworth: Penguin Books. pp. 769–771. ISBN 0-14-071045-0.
- Thomas, D N (2004) Dylan Remembered 1935-1953, vol. 2 pp124–139, Seren.
