= South Leigh railway station =

Former railway station in Oxfordshire, England

South Leigh
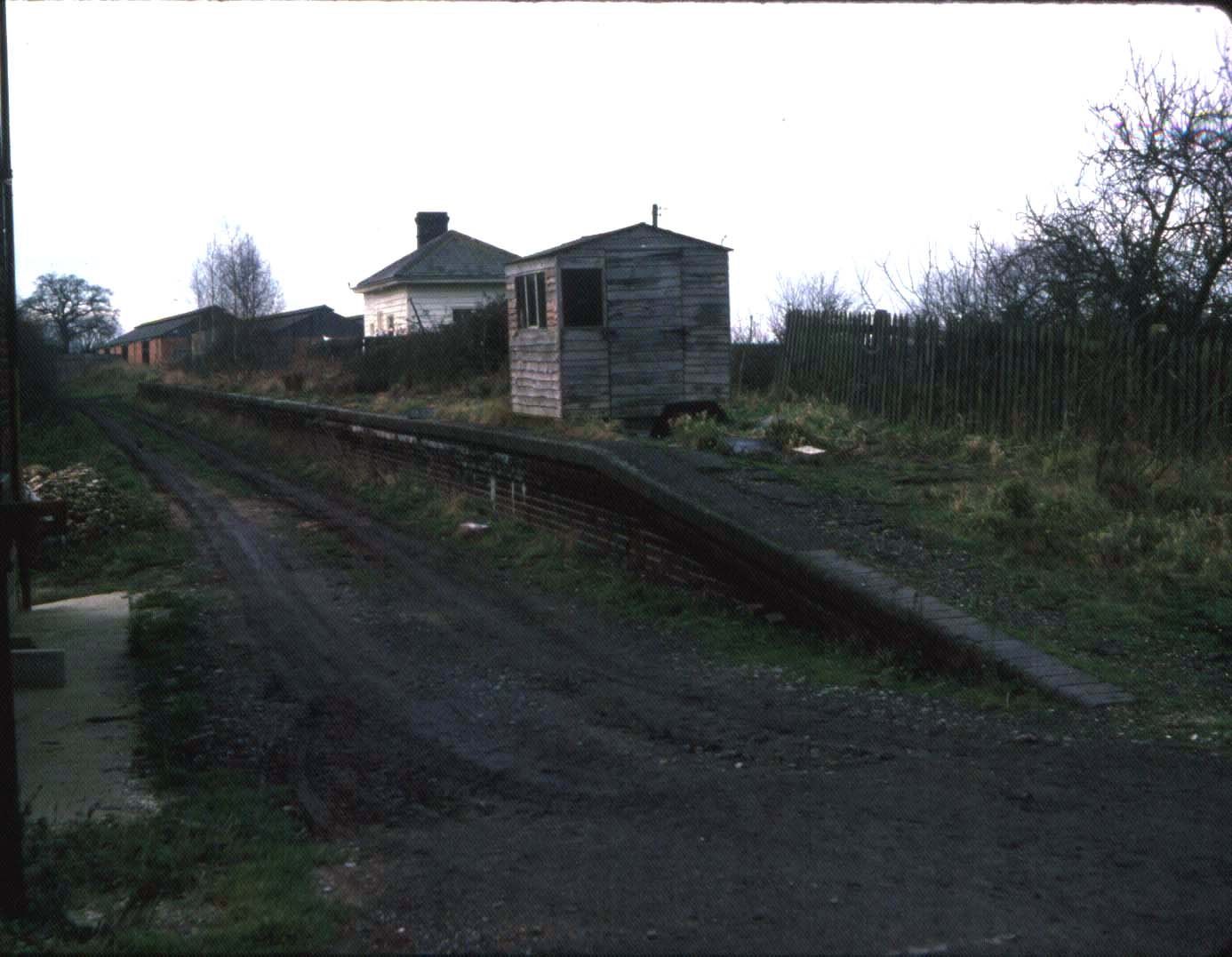
- Station site in 1975.

General information
- Location: South Leigh, West Oxfordshire; England
- Coordinates: 51.77086°N 1.42704°W
- Grid reference: SP396082
- Platforms: 1

Other information
- Status: Disused

History
- Original company: Witney Railway
- Pre-grouping: Great Western Railway
- Post-grouping: Great Western Railway

Key dates
- 14 November 1861: Opened
- 18 June 1962: Closed to passengers
- 26 April 1965: Closed to goods
- 2 November 1970: Line closed
Location

South Leigh railway station was a single-platform station that served the Oxfordshire village of South Leigh on the Oxford, Witney and Fairford Railway between Oxford and Witney. The Witney Railway opened the station in 1861. British Railways closed the station to passengers in 1962 and to goods in 1965.

== History ==
South Leigh station was opened by the Witney Railway on 14 November 1861. It is possible that the station was not yet fully constructed when opened as records show evidence of works in November and December 1861. When eventually completed, the station had a single low and short platform and a simple, unpretentious hip-roofed rectangular timber station building, which was a smaller version of that at Eynsham. Perhaps in recognition of the fact that the community served at South Leigh was only a small agricultural village, there was no goods shed or loading crane; instead, a single siding served a small goods yard. There was no signalling and the basic track layout was controlled by three ground frames. A corrugated iron hut was situated on the platform and served as a goods lock-up and parcels shed. A cattle dock and weigh bridge were also on or near the platform. Outbuildings were later provided to house toilets.

Despite being one of the smallest stations on the line, South Leigh was well-patronised and records show that around 6,000 tickets a year were booked in the 1920s, generally short shopping trips to Witney. This was even though the station was on the edge of the town. Goods traffic was less substantial and consisted mainly of cattle and agricultural machinery, although local farms did contribute to a heavy milk trade. The station platform was extended eastwards towards the level crossing to reach a length of 300 feet (91 m). In 1940, the local Home Guard used the station's waiting room as a meeting place, there being no other suitable location in the village. A buffer food store was provided near the goods yard during the Second World War and the goods siding was extended in 1942 to serve it.

British Railways closed the station to passenger traffic on 18 June 1962 and to goods on 26 April 1965. The goods siding had been taken out of use in April 1964. Full closure of the line did not come until Monday 2 November 1970.

Preceding station	Disused railways	Following station
Witney; Line and station closed	Great Western Railway; East Gloucestershire Railway	Eynsham; Line and station closed
Witney (goods); Line and station closed	Great Western Railway; Witney Railway	Eynsham; Line and station closed

== Present day ==
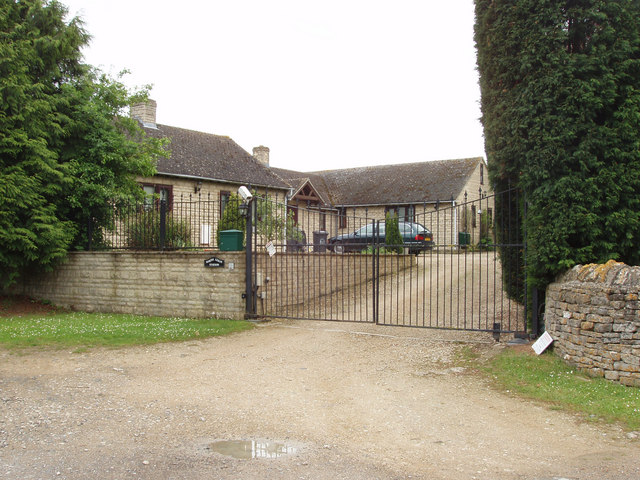
Station site in 2009.

The station remained much in the same appearance until its closure. It was thereafter converted into an attractive dwelling complete with central heating, mains water and electricity. It was sold for £8,000 in February 1975 and planning permission was granted for the demolition of the station and the construction of a new bungalow over the trackbed. Although a large section of the embankment near the station has been removed by farmers, it is possible to reach the site via a public footpath which runs parallel to the former line. The station house still remains and is now named "Old Crossing". In 1992, the old food store building, long since out-of-use, was still standing.
