= Gosford, Oxfordshire =

Village in Oxfordshire, England

Coordinates: 51.818°N 1.271°W

Gosford
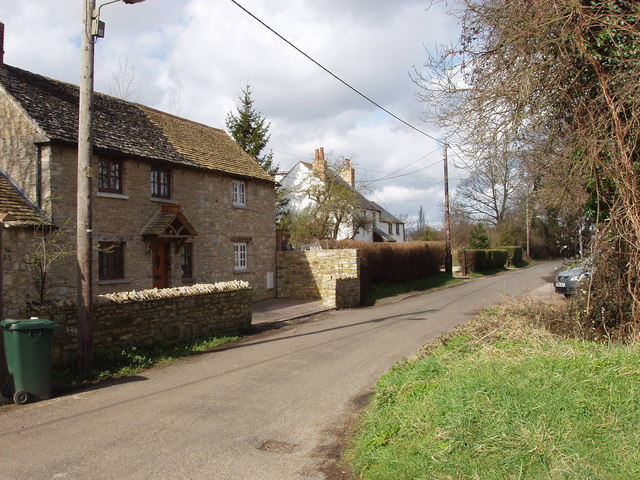
- Water Eaton Lane, Gosford

- Location within Oxfordshire
- Population: 1,373 (parish, including Water Eaton) (2011 Census)
- OS grid reference: SP5013
- Civil parish: Gosford and Water Eaton
- District: Cherwell
- Shire county: Oxfordshire
- Region: South East
- Country: England
- Sovereign state: United Kingdom
- Post town: Kidlington
- Postcode district: OX5
- Dialling code: 01865
- Police: Thames Valley
- Fire: Oxfordshire
- Ambulance: South Central
- UK Parliament: Banbury
- Website: Gosford and Water Eaton Parish Council

Gosford is a village immediately southeast of Kidlington, in the Cherwell district, Oxfordshire, England. It is in the civil parish of Gosford and Water Eaton. The 2011 Census recorded Gosford and Water Eaton's parish population as 1,373.

== History ==
Gosford seems to have been a township of the parish of Kidlington until 1142, when the manor of Gosford was granted to the Order of Knights Hospitaller. The Order held it until the Dissolution of the Monasteries in the 16th century. In the 16th century Gosford was administered with Water Eaton. The toponym "Gosford" is derived from Old English and means "goose ford". It was recorded as Goseford in 1242–46 and Goseforde in 1316.

There has been a bridge across the River Cherwell at Gosford since at least 1319, when it was recorded in a patent roll. In 1395 it was recorded as Gosefordebrugge. In the 16th century the antiquarian John Leland noted that it was a stone bridge. In the 17th century the cartographer John Ogilby recorded it as Offord Bridge. In the 17th century "Mr. Richard Washington, gent" (died 1670) maintained a school at Gosford. In 1838 a penny post station was opened in Gosford. There was a full post office by 1847 that remained until 1853. Gosford was formerly a hamlet in the parish of Kidlington, in 1866 Gosford became a separate civil parish, on 1 April 1932 the parish was abolished to form "Gosford and Water Eaton", parts also went to form Hampton Gay and Poyle and to Kidlington. In 1931 the parish had a population of 75. In 1932 a secondary school, Kidlington Church of England Central School, was founded in Gosford. It is now Gosford Hill School.

== Amenities ==
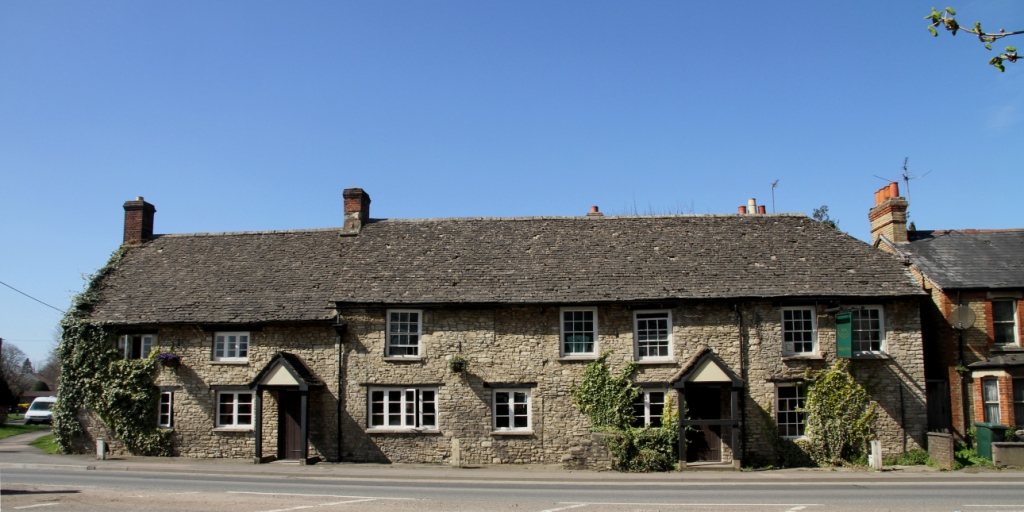
The King's Arms

Gosford has an 18th-century pub, the King's Arms, in Bicester Road. It is now a Miller & Carter steakhouse. Gosford also has a J Sainsbury supermarket with a filling station.

=== Public transport ===
Stagecoach in Oxfordshire bus route S5 and Diamond bus route 250 serve Bicester Road. Route S5 is a direct service between Oxford and Bicester that runs seven days a week. Route 250 also links Oxford and Bicester, but runs via various villages including Upper Heyford. Route 250 runs from Mondays to Saturdays, mostly at hourly intervals. It has no late evening service, and no service on Sundays or bank holidays. Numerous Oxford Bus Company and Stagecoach bus routes serve Oxford Road, which forms Gosford's western boundary with Kidlington Garden City. Buses that serve Bicester Road or Oxford Road link Gosford with Oxford Parkway railway station, which is at Water Eaton, about 1 mile (1.6 km) south of Gosford.

== Bibliography ==
- Crossley, Alan; Elrington, CR, eds. (1990). "Kidlington: Introduction". A History of the County of Oxford. Victoria County History. Vol. 12: Wootton Hundred (South) including Woodstock. London: Oxford University Press for the Institute of Historical Research. pp. 179–213. ISBN 978-0-19722-774-9.
- Gelling, Margaret (1954). Smith, AH (ed.). The Place-Names of Oxfordshire, Part II. Vol. XXIV. based on material collected by Doris Mary Stenton. Cambridge: Cambridge University Press for the English Place-Name Society.
- Jervoise, Edwyn (1932). The Ancient Bridges of Mid and Eastern England. Vol. III. Westminster: The Architectural Press for the SPAB.
