= Sunnymead =

Coordinates: 51.785°N 1.266°W

- Location within Oxfordshire
- OS grid reference: SP507098
- Civil parish: unparished
- District: Oxford
- Shire county: Oxfordshire
- Region: South East
- Country: England
- Sovereign state: United Kingdom
- Post town: Oxford
- Postcode district: OX2
- Dialling code: 01865
- Police: Thames Valley
- Fire: Oxfordshire
- Ambulance: South Central
- UK Parliament: Oxford West and Abingdon
- Website: Oxford City Council

Sunnymead is a suburb in the northern part of Oxford, England, just south of the Oxford Ring Road (A40). Close by are the suburbs of Cutteslowe to the north, Summertown to the south and Upper Wolvercote to the west. To the east is the River Cherwell, which flows south towards central Oxford.

== See also ==
- North Oxford
