= Oxford Road Halt railway station =

Disused railway station in Oxfordshire, England

Coordinates: 51.8030°N 1.2759°W

Oxford Road Halt
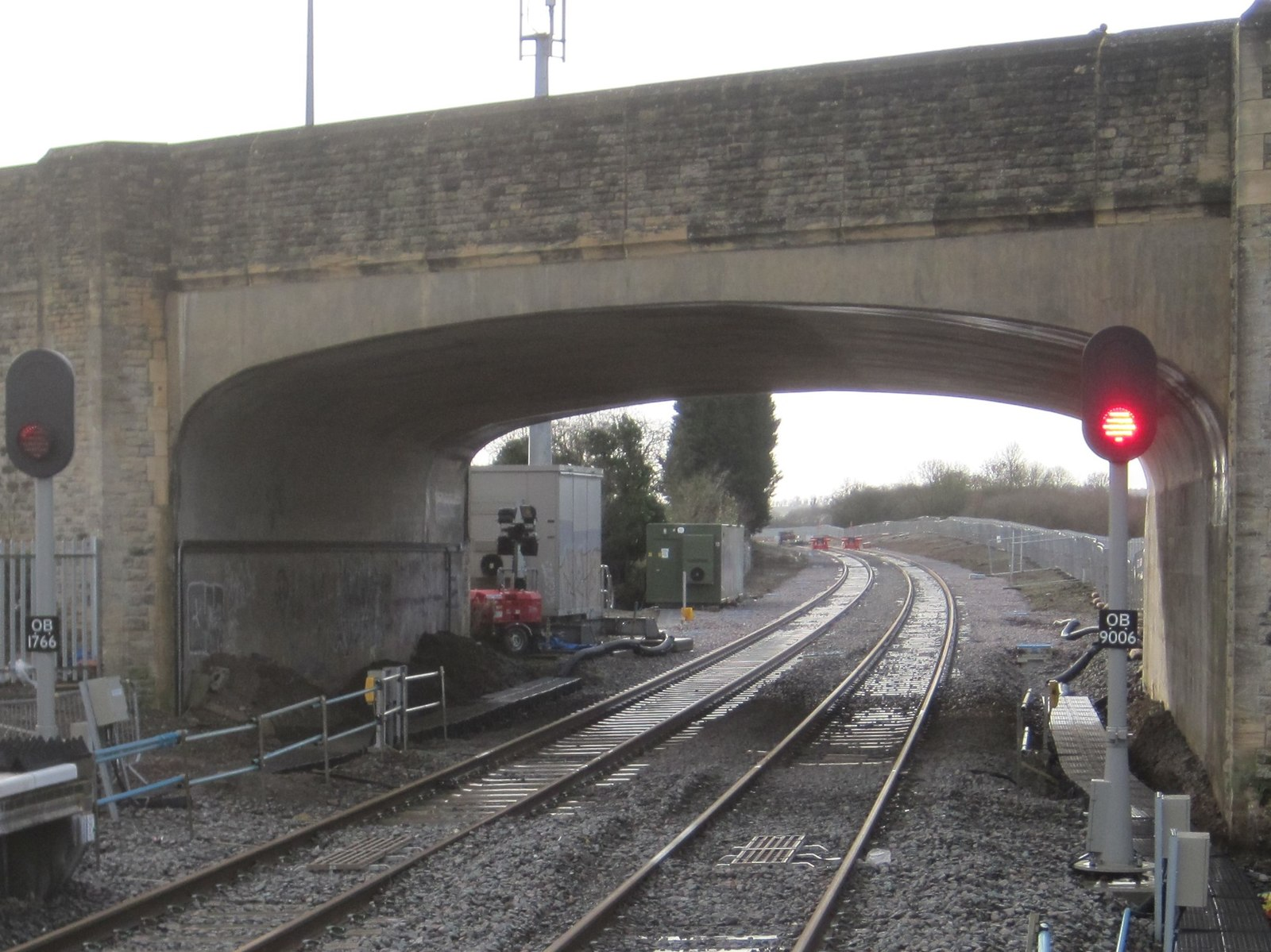
- The site of the station in 2016

General information
- Location: Water Eaton, Cherwell; England
- Grid reference: SP500118
- Platforms: 2

Other information
- Status: Disused

History
- Original company: London and North Western Railway
- Pre-grouping: London and North Western Railway
- Post-grouping: LMSR

Key dates
- 1905: Opened
- 1917: Closed
- 1919: Reopened
- 1926: Closed Completely
Location

Oxford Road Halt was a railway station on the Varsity Line 1 mile (1.6 km) west of the hamlet of Water Eaton, Oxfordshire.

== History ==
The Varsity Line from Bletchley to Oxford was opened in stages by the Buckinghamshire Railway. It had been opened as far as Islip on 1 October 1850, from Islip to a temporary station at Banbury Road on 2 December 1850, and from Banbury Road to Oxford on 20 May 1851. At the point where the main Oxford-Banbury road (now the A4165 road) crossed the line, a level crossing was constructed, known as Oxford Road Crossing (grid reference SP500118). This was the location of the temporary Oxford-Banbury Road terminus, which was used until the facilities at Oxford were ready.

On 1 April 1854 the Buckinghamshire Junction Railway (often known as the Yarnton Loop) was opened, between Oxford Road Junction and Yarnton Junction. The former junction was constructed just to the south-west of Oxford Road Crossing, although the two routes did not diverge until a point somewhat further to the south-west, at grid reference SP499116.

For over fifty years no permanent station had been provided between Oxford and Islip. In 1905, the London and North Western Railway (successor to the Buckinghamshire Railway) constructed three halts on that stretch of line; two were Summertown Halt (later Port Meadow Halt) and Wolvercote Halt, whilst the northernmost was Oxford Road Halt, and which was situated just east of Oxford Road Crossing. Two of these halts (including Oxford Road Halt) were opened on 9 October 1905; all three closed on 1 January 1917, reopened 5 May 1919 and the London, Midland and Scottish Railway finally closed them on 25 October 1926.

In 1935 the Oxford Road level crossing was replaced by a bridge to the north-east, which crosses the railway over the site of the former halt.

In 1942 a Government grain silo was built next to the site as part of a Second World War network to concentrate scarce food and distribute it by rail. It was in operation until the late 1980s. In October 2013 Chiltern Railways had it demolished as part of site preparation for the planned Oxford Parkway railway station and car park.

Oxford Road Junction remained; the signalbox was resited slightly to the north-east on 4 November 1956, and on 15 September 1958 was renamed Banbury Road Junction, since there is a junction just north of Reading West also named Oxford Road Junction. It was closed on 29 October 1973.

== Oxford Parkway ==
As part of the operator's Project Evergreen 3, Chiltern Railways opened a new station called Oxford Parkway in 2015, on an adjacent site next to the existing Water Eaton Park and Ride site. It is a stop on their service between London Marylebone and Oxford.

== Route ==
Preceding station	Historical railways	Following station
Wolvercote Halt; Line open, station closed	London and North Western Railway; Varsity Line	Islip; Line and station open
