= Kidlington =

Town in Oxfordshire, England

Coordinates: 51°49′23″N 1°17′25″W

- Town
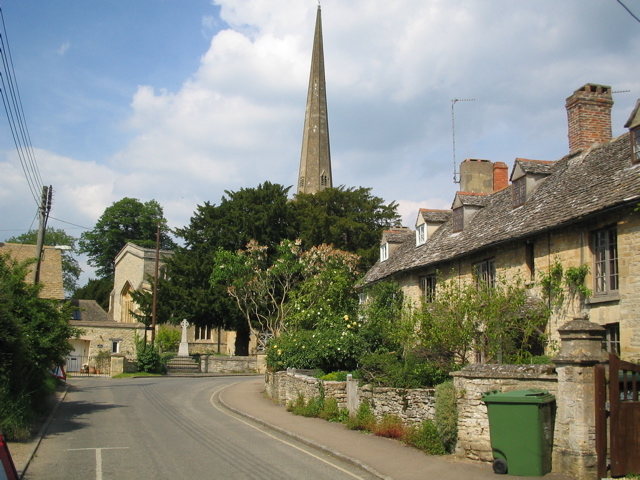
- Church Street, Kidlington

- Location within Oxfordshire
- Population: 13,600 (2021 Census)
- OS grid reference: SP4914
- Civil parish: Kidlington
- District: Cherwell
- Shire county: Oxfordshire
- Region: South East
- Country: England
- Sovereign state: United Kingdom
- Post town: Kidlington
- Postcode district: OX5
- Dialling code: 01865
- Police: Thames Valley
- Fire: Oxfordshire
- Ambulance: South Central
- UK Parliament: Bicester and Woodstock
- Website: kidlington-pc.gov.uk

Kidlington is a town in the Cherwell district of Oxfordshire, England (as of the 19th February 2026). In February 2026, Kidlington Parish Council voted unanimously to change its status from a village to a town.

It is situated between the River Cherwell and Oxford Canal, 5 miles (8 km) north of Oxford and 8 miles (13 km) south-west of Bicester. It had a population of 13,600 at the 2021 Census.

== History ==
Kidlington's toponym derives from the Old English Cudelinga tun: the tun (settlement) of the "Kidlings" (sons) of Cydel-hence. The Domesday Book in 1086 records Chedelintone. By 1214 the spelling Kedelinton appears in a Calendar of Bodleian Charters. The Church of England parish church of St Mary the Virgin dates from 1220, but there is evidence of a church on the site since 1073. St Mary's has fine medieval stained glass and a 165-foot (50 m) spire known as "Our Lady's Needle". It is a Grade I listed building. The tower has a ring of eight bells. Richard III Chandler of Drayton Parslow, Buckinghamshire, cast the seventh bell in 1700. Abraham I Rudhall of Gloucester cast the tenor bell in 1708 and the fifth bell in 1715. Mears and Stainbank of the Whitechapel Bell Foundry cast the treble, second, third, fourth and sixth bells in 1897, the year of Queen Victoria's Diamond Jubilee.

Behind the church are archaeological remains of a three-sided moat. St Mary's Rectory is Tudor. Beside the church are almshouses built by Sir William Morton in 1671 in memory of his wife and children, whose names are inscribed above the windows. Sir William was a Royalist Commander in the Civil War and lived in nearby Hampden Manor in Mill Street. Other residents of Hampden Manor have included Sir John Vanbrugh, during the building of Blenheim Palace in Woodstock. The square tower-water closet in the front garden of Hampden Manor was built by Vanbrugh. It drains into a brook that now runs underground along Mill Street into the nearby Cherwell. Thomas Beecham formulated his pills while living in a cottage near the manor and worked for a time as a gardener for John Sydenham.

Kidlington Inclosure Act 1810
- Act of Parliament
- Parliament of the United Kingdom
- Long title: An Act for inclosing Lands in the Parish of Kidlington in the County of Oxford.
- Citation: 50 Geo. 3. c. clviii

Dates
- Royal assent: 2 June 1810

Text of statute as originally enacted

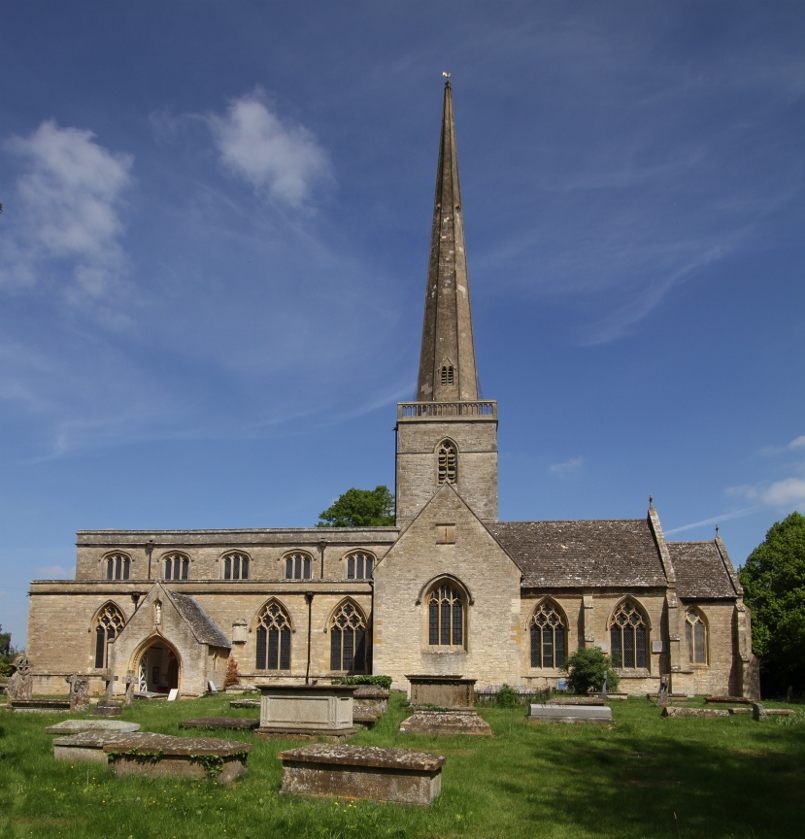
Parish church of St Mary the Virgin. Its tall spire is a local landmark, nicknamed "Our Lady's Needle"

The settlement listed in Domesday grew from an ancient village close to the church. It has as many 18th-century Georgian buildings as modern houses. Until the Kidlington Inclosure Act 1810 (50 Geo. 3. c. clviii) was implemented in 1818, a large area south of it was unenclosed common land and the village widely known as Kidlington-on-the-Green. The land was built up as a garden city just before the Second World War. In the 1920s and 1930s, Kidlington was subject to ribbon development along the main (now A4260) road through the village. Since 1945 many housing estates have been built behind this on both sides. Oxford Zoo was once located in Kidlington, where the Thames Valley Police headquarters now stands. It was open only from 1931 to 1937, when the animals were transferred to Dudley Zoo. In 2018, an elephant sculpture was installed on a roundabout at the southern end of Kidlington to commemorate the zoo and an elephant that lived there.

In the 20th century, Kidlington grew to be a contender for largest village in England (even in Europe), with a population of 13,723, compared with 1,300 in 1901. Its residents previously resisted efforts to change its official status to a town. After a peremptory change by the Parish Council to town status in November 1987, this was voted down by 83 per cent three months later in a ballot of the local electorate. In February 2026, Kidlington officially became a town.

== Railways ==
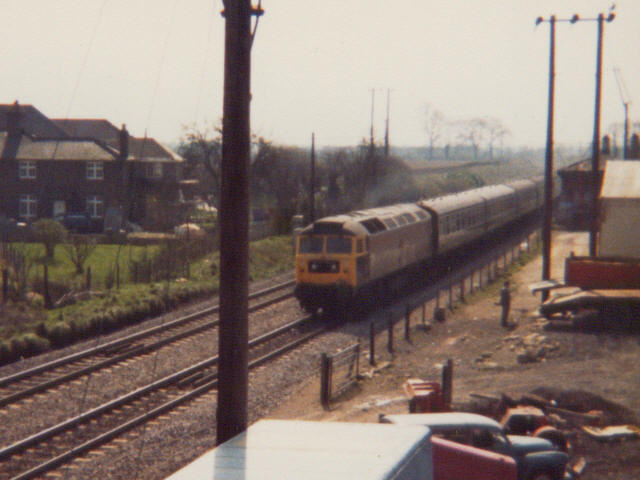
The site of former Kidlington railway station

Kidlington's railway station opened near Langford Lane in 1852 as Woodstock Road Station on the Great Western Railway. It was designed by Isambard Kingdom Brunel. A branch line was added between Kidlington and Woodstock in 1890 and a new Blenheim and Woodstock railway station built at Woodstock, renaming Woodstock Road as Kidlington Station. British Railways closed the station in 1964. The building remained into the 1980s. From the 1980s onwards it has been Oxfordshire County Council policy to open a new station on land between Flatford Place and Thorne Close on Lyne Road. This has yet to happen.

At Water Eaton, 1 1/2 miles (2.4 km) south of the centre of Kidlington, there was a railway halt at Oxford Road on the former Varsity Line. The halt was opened by the London and North Western Railway in 1905 and closed by its successor, the London, Midland and Scottish Railway in 1926. In October 2015 Chiltern Railways and Network Rail opened a new Oxford Parkway railway station near the site of the former Oxford Road Halt with trains every 30 minutes between London Marylebone via Bicester Village and High Wycombe and Oxford.

== Amenities ==
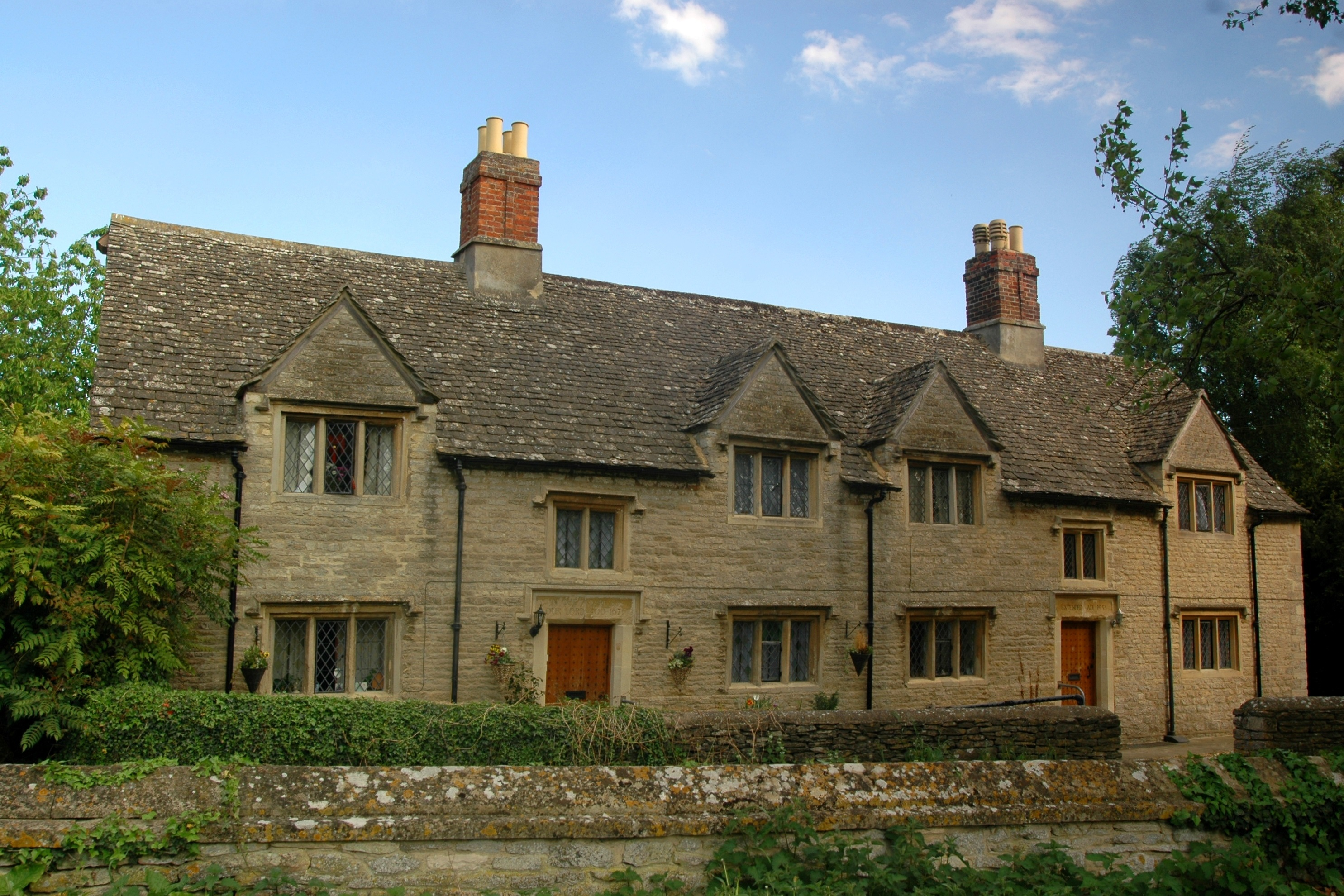
Lady Anne Morton's almshouses, next to the parish church

Kidlington has about 50 shops, banks and building societies, a public library, a large village hall and a weekly market. There are seven pubs, two cafes and four restaurants. There are three primary schools in Kidlington's parish and a secondary school in the neighbouring parish Gosford and Water Eaton (Gosford Hill) as well as another primary school. Recently Gosford Hill School started a narrow-band radio show for its pupils. Kidlington has a Women's Institute.

== Economy ==
The headquarters of Oxfordshire Fire and Rescue Service, Thames Valley Police and the county St. John Ambulance are in Kidlington, as is Oxford Airport, renamed London Oxford Airport in 2009. Since 1962 the airport has had a pilot training school for thousands from airlines in more than 40 countries. It is also home to one of the bases for the Children's Air Ambulance.

There are several industrial and business parks and a motor park in the north of the village. Opposite is Langford Locks industrial estate and Oxford Motor Park, with showrooms for Honda, Nissan, Toyota and other makes. Other businesses include Essentra Components, Eurocopter and Guylian Chocolates. Campsfield House, an immigration detention centre run for the UK government, is near the industrial area and the airport.

== Tourism ==
In June 2016, the BBC reported that weekly coachloads of sightseers from China were arriving on Benmead Road, Kidlington, and seen posing for photos in front gardens and against parked cars, with no apparent reason for their interest. The story attracted worldwide interest, with Kidlington locals offering interviews about their experience. In November 2016, after analysing results of a Chinese-language questionnaire given to some tourists, the BBC found that "looking for the true sense" of Britain was one reason for the visits. An investigative journalist found that in fact Chinese tour operators charge £50 (US$68) extra for Chinese-language tours of nearby Blenheim Palace. Tourists who do not want to pay to visit Blenheim are dropped off in Kidlington, which they find charming, but which tour operators select because it is too far from Blenheim to enable tourists to walk to the Palace and pay the cheaper £13 (US$25) price for public tours in English.

== Music ==
Kidlington has had a brass band since 1892. Earlier bands known from at least the 1850s. The current Kidlington Concert Brass arose from a merger of Kidlington Silver Band and Oxford Concert Brass in 1992. It gives local concerts and competes nationally. Kidlington Amateur Operatic Society (KAOS), founded in 1977, performs varied choral material in the village several times a year and has regular productions of musicals.

== Sports ==
=== Football ===
Kidlington Football Club is a semi-professional side founded in 1909. Its first team plays in the Evo-Stik League South Division One Central and its reserve in Uhlsport Hellenic Division One West. It also runs an under-18 youth team that plays in the Allied Counties League and an U16 team. All four are based at a ground in Yarnton Road. The pitch is floodlit, with spectator terracing and seating for 150. In the 2010–2011 season Kidlington first reached the final of the Oxfordshire Senior Cup, where it was beaten by Oxford United at the Kassam Stadium. Kidlington F.C. previously played at other sites in or just outside the village.

Kidlington Royals Football Club is a Sunday football team in the Premier Division of the Upper Thames Valley League. It was founded in 2004 and plays home games at Bletchington Sports Ground, just outside Kidlington. It consists of players who play Saturday football, including the Blue Square (football conference), Southern League and the Hellenic Premier Division. In April 2012 it reached the final of the Oxfordshire FA Sam Waters Challenge Cup, losing 3–2 after extra time to Highfield. The club reached the final of the competition again in 2013. Kidlington Old Boys' Football Club, formed in 1999, is currently in the Oxfordshire Senior League Division 1. Its home games are played at Exeter Close.

==== Proposed Oxford United stadium ====
In 2022, Oxford United asked Oxfordshire County Council to transfer c. 18 hectares (44.48 acres) of land for the development of a new 18,000 capacity football stadium with ancillary leisure and commercial facilities to include, hotel, retail, conference, and training/community grounds on Green Belt land at Stratfield Brake near Kidlington. On 18 January 2022, OCC recommended an engagement exercise be carried out first to gather feedback from the local community. Among local residents, 38 per cent were in favour, whilst 58 per cent were against.

In February 2023, Oxford United unveiled plans to build a new 'all-electric', 16,000-seat stadium, to open in 2026, on the Triangle site in Kidlington. OCC's cabinet had consented to lease the proposed site to the club. South of Kidlington roundabout, the site is east of the Stratfield Brake site, being situated between Frieze Way and Oxford Road, with proposed pedestrian access from Oxford Parkway railway station. The club's architect, AFL, submitted its full planning application for the scheme on 1 March 2024. In June 2024, a decision on the application was postponed to 2025 to allow further work on the proposals to "provide further clarity" for the planning committee.

=== Rugby ===
The Gosford All Blacks rugby union team, founded on 15 May 1956, takes its name from the New Zealand All Blacks team, which toured in that season. It remains based in Kidlington. The first team plays in the Berks, Bucks & Oxon Premier League. When founded, the club used the Gosford Hill School pitch and facilities. The King's Arms, the Moors, became its headquarters. In May 1959 the club moved to Langford Lane and in December 1962 became the youngest club to acquire its own clubhouse, after the neighbouring airport donated a hangar for the purpose. Gosford All Blacks held the county rugby shield in the 2011–12 season.

=== Cricket ===
Kidlington Cricket Club, founded in 1837, used to play in the Oxford Times Cherwell Cricket League, but in January 2009 the League voted to expel it for alleged breaches of rules which were never proven. In the 2010 season, the club began to play in the Oxfordshire Cricket Association (OCA) league, After a league merger, Kidlington now play in the Cherwell League again with 3 sides.

=== Motor racing ===
For 1976 to 1998, Kidlington was home base for a motor racing team, Tom Walkinshaw Racing, founded by the Scottish driver Tom Walkinshaw. It raced cars that included the Rover Vitesse, Mazda RX-7, Jaguar XJS and Holden Commodore, while acting as the factory-backed Jaguar team in sports car racing and touring car racing. It went on to win several championships, including the World Sportscar Championship, the European and the British Touring Car Championships, and some high-profile races, including the 24 Hours of Le Mans, the Spa 24 Hours and the Bathurst 1000. Since 2016, it has served as the home of 2023-24 Formula E Teams' and Manufacturers Champion Jaguar Racing, as well as Fortescue Zero Racing since 2026.

== Sources ==
- Compton, Hugh J (1976). The Oxford Canal. Newton Abbot: David & Charles. pp. 37, 117, 150. ISBN 0-7153-7238-6.
- Crossley, Alan; Elrington, C.R., eds. (1990). "Kidlington". A History of the County of Oxford. Victoria County History. Vol. 12: Wootton Hundred (South) including Woodstock. pp. 179–213.
- Emery, Frank (1974). The Oxfordshire Landscape. The Making of the English Landscape. London: Hodder & Stoughton. pp. 141, 166, 167, 182, 184. ISBN 0-340-04301-6.
- Sherwood, Jennifer; Pevsner, Nikolaus (1974). Oxfordshire. The Buildings of England. Harmondsworth: Penguin Books. pp. 670–672. ISBN 0-14-071045-0.
- Wing, William (1881). Annals of Kidlington (reprint ed.). Oxford: Oxford Chronicle.
