= Buckinghamshire Junction Railway =

The Buckinghamshire Junction Railway, often known as the Yarnton Loop, was a standard gauge railway between Buckingham Junction on the Oxford, Worcester and Wolverhampton Railway (OW&WR) and Oxford Road Junction on the Buckinghamshire Railway. It was opened on 1 April 1854 to enable OW&W trains to and from Wolverhampton to connect with London and North Western Railway trains to and from London Euston.

== Interchange station ==
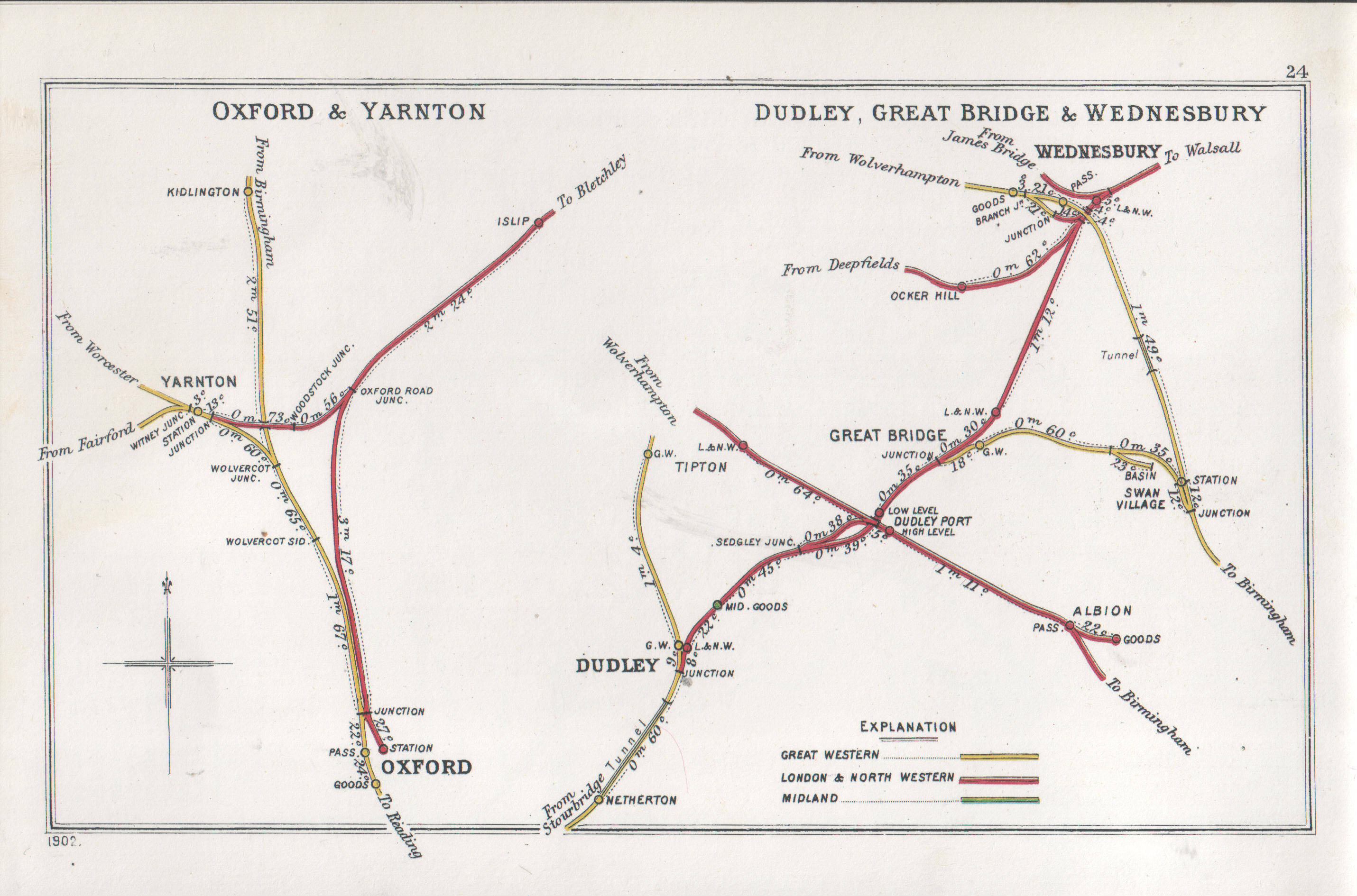
A 1902 Railway Clearing House Junction Diagram showing (left) the Buckinghamshire Junction Railway and neighbouring lines

Handborough station was the interchange for the line, and had a refreshment room built for the purpose. The OW&WR planned a "grand new interchange station" at Yarnton but it was never built.

== Take-over by GWR ==
The OW&WR amalgamated with other railways to form the West Midland Railway (WMR) on 1 July 1860; and on 30 April 1861, the WMR and the Great Western Railway (GWR) reached an agreement under which they were to work closely together from 1 July 1861 with a view to full amalgamation. The GWR, WMR and the South Wales Railway (SWR) formally amalgamated on 1 August 1863 and did not continue connecting services with the rival L&NWR. The BJR remained open for freight, and was colloquially known as the Yarnton Loop.

== Closure ==
British Railways closed the BJR in 1965. Since then the Woodstock Road crossing (ex-A34 road now A44 road) has been replaced with a roundabout, part of the A4260 road has been built along the trackbed and part of the A34 road has been built across the trackbed. The level crossing keeper's lodge still exists, and is now a private house (grid reference SP491112).
