= Gosford and Water Eaton =

Civil parish in Cherwell, Oxfordshire, England

Coordinates: 51.80°N 1.27°W

- Civil parish
- Location within Oxfordshire
- Civil parish: Gosford and Water Eaton
- District: Cherwell
- Shire county: Oxfordshire
- Region: South East
- Country: England
- Sovereign state: United Kingdom
- Post town: Kidlington
- Postcode district: OX5
- Dialling code: 01865
- Police: Thames Valley
- Fire: Oxfordshire
- Ambulance: South Central
- UK Parliament: Bicester and Woodstock

Gosford and Water Eaton is a civil parish in the Cherwell district of the county of Oxfordshire, England. It is north of the city of Oxford and is crossed nearby by two major roads for, or by-passing, the city. The parish contains the village of Gosford and the hamlet of Water Eaton and as at the 2011 census had 1,373 people resident across its 8.75 km^{2}.
