= Water Eaton, Oxfordshire =

Hamlet in Oxfordshire, England

Coordinates: 51.804°N 1.262°W

Water Eaton
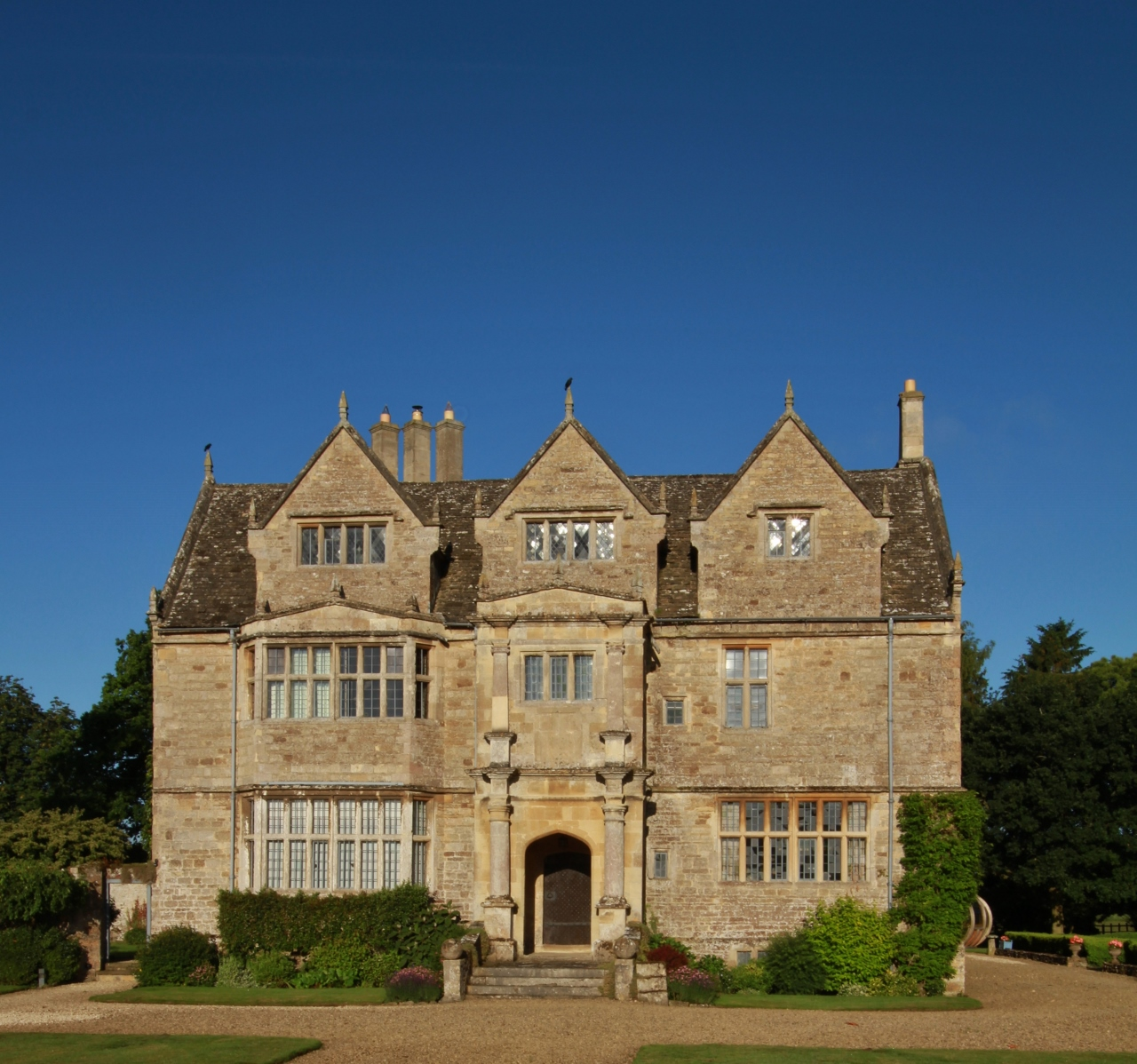
- Water Eaton Manor House

- Location within Oxfordshire
- OS grid reference: SP5112
- Civil parish: Gosford and Water Eaton
- District: Cherwell
- Shire county: Oxfordshire
- Region: South East
- Country: England
- Sovereign state: United Kingdom
- Post town: Oxford
- Postcode district: OX2 8HE
- Dialling code: 01865
- Police: Thames Valley
- Fire: Oxfordshire
- Ambulance: South Central
- UK Parliament: Banbury

Water Eaton is a hamlet in the civil parish of Gosford and Water Eaton, in the Cherwell district, in the county of Oxfordshire, England. It is between Oxford and Kidlington.

Water-Eaton was formerly in the parish of Kidlington, in 1866 Water Eaton became a separate civil parish, on 1 April 1932 the parish was abolished and merged with Gosford to form "Gosford and Water Eaton". In 1931 the parish had a population of 127.

== Manor ==
Eaton is a common English place-name. In this case it appears as Eatun in Anglo-Saxon charters from 864, 904 and 929, Etone in the Domesday Book of 1086 and Water Eton in a Charter Roll from 1268. Eaton is derived from Old English and in this case means tūn ("farm") by a river. The prefix "Water" seems tautological, but it distinguishes Water Eaton from Woodeaton just over 1 mile (1.6 km) to the east. Water Eaton manor house was built for Sir Edward Frere in 1586 but reduced in size at a later date. The Gothic Revival architect GF Bodley restored the house in 1890 and made it his home. It is now a Grade II* listed building.

A Perpendicular Gothic Church of England chapel was built northeast of the manor house in 1610 and restored in 1884. The chapel is a Grade I listed building. East of the manor house are two detached 17th-century "pavilions" or guest houses and a square 17th-century dovecote. At the end of the First English Civil War in June 1646 the Articles of Surrender for the siege of Oxford were finally agreed in Water Eaton. They were signed on 20 June in the Audit House of Christ Church, Oxford.

== St Frideswide's Farm ==
St Frideswide's Farmhouse is a 16th-century Tudor stone house, and towards the end of that century was a home of the Lenthall family. The house was extended in the 17th or 18th and 20th centuries. It is now a Grade II* listed building.

== Transport ==
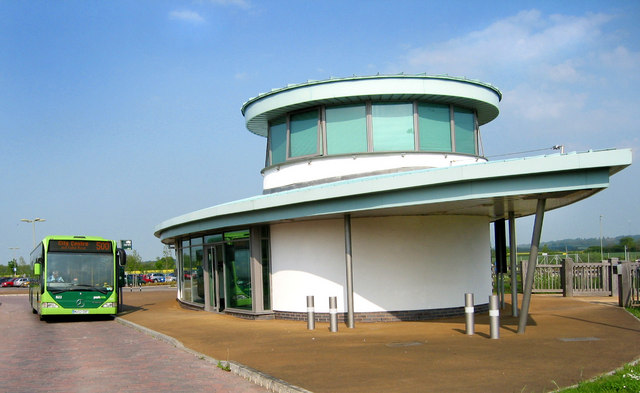
Water Eaton park and ride site in 2008

In 1850 the Buckinghamshire Railway between Bletchley and Oxford was opened through the parish. In 1905 Oxford Road Halt was opened 1 mile (1.6 km) west of the manor house. The halt was short-lived, being closed down in 1926. In 1940 a grain silo and rail siding were built on the south side of the former halt. The silo has been disused since the 1980s but remained a landmark visible over a wide area. The silo was demolished in October 2013. In the 2000s Oxfordshire County Council opened a Park and ride site just south of the grain silo. In October 2015 Chiltern Railways opened Oxford Parkway station next to the park and ride and near the site of the former halt.

== Bibliography ==
- Crossley, Alan; Elrington, CR, eds. (1990). "Kidlington". A History of the County of Oxford. Victoria County History. Vol. 12: Wootton Hundred (South) including Woodstock. London: Oxford University Press for the Institute of Historical Research. pp. 179–213. ISBN 978-0-19722-774-9.
- Ekwall, Eilert (1960) [1936]. Concise Oxford Dictionary of English Place-Names (4th ed.). Oxford: Oxford University Press. Eaton. ISBN 0198691033.
- Sherwood, Jennifer; Pevsner, Nikolaus (1974). Oxfordshire. The Buildings of England. Harmondsworth: Penguin Books. pp. 825–826. ISBN 0-14-071045-0.
