= Witney railway station =

Former railway station in Oxfordshire, England

Witney
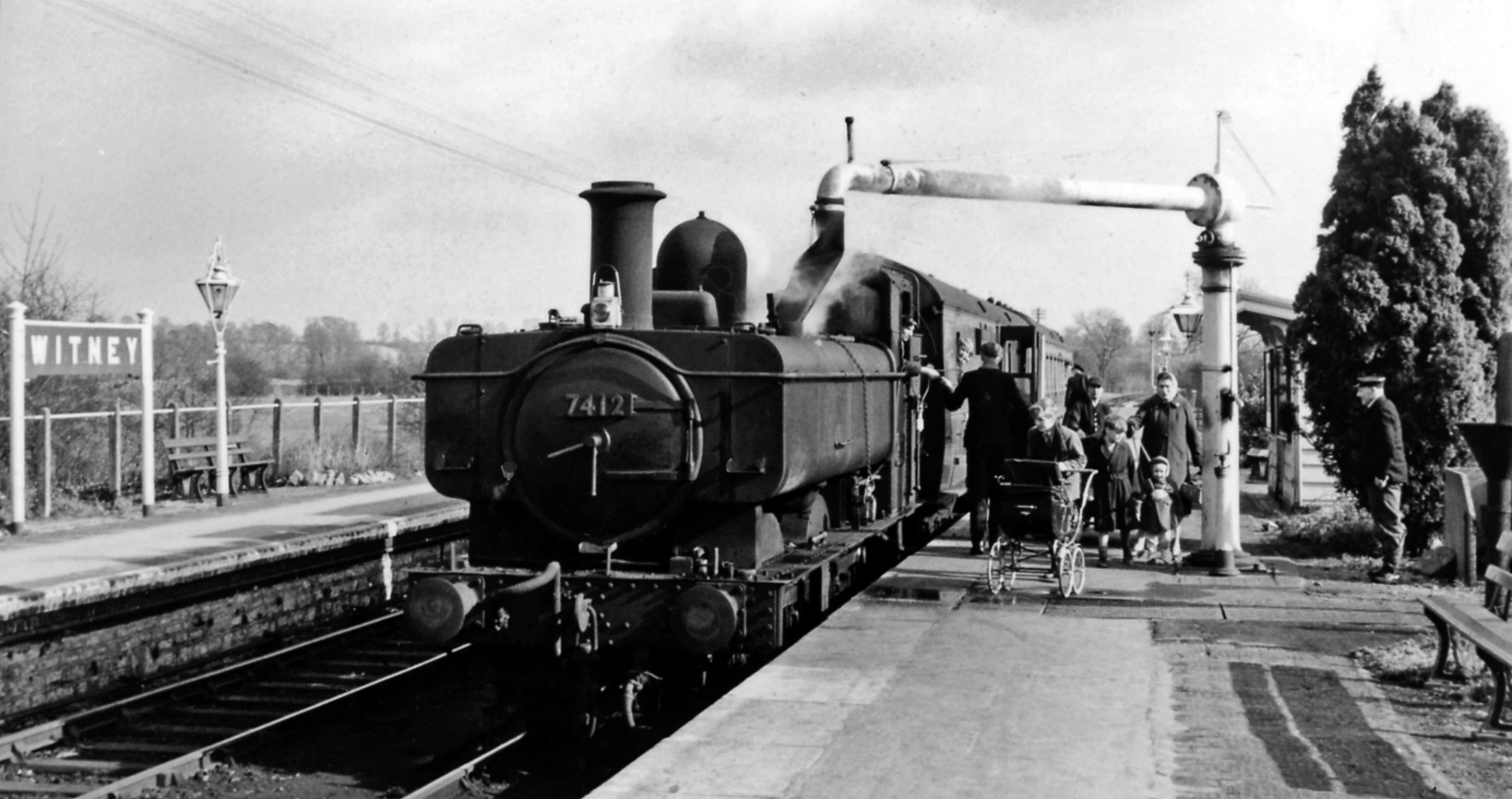
- GWR 7400 No. 7412 at Witney with an Oxford-Fairford service in 1962, while the driver exchanges the single-line tablet with the porter-signalman

General information
- Location: Witney, West Oxfordshire; England
- Coordinates: 51.77725°N 1.48540°W
- Grid reference: SP356088
- Platforms: 2

Other information
- Status: Disused

History
- Original company: East Gloucestershire Railway
- Pre-grouping: Great Western Railway
- Post-grouping: Great Western Railway

Key dates
- 15 January 1873: Opened
- 18 June 1962: Closed to passengers
- c. 1965: Closed to goods
Location

Witney railway station served the Oxfordshire town of Witney on the Oxford, Witney and Fairford Railway line. It consisted of two stone-built platforms, a station building, a signal box, and a shed in the form of a pagoda.

== History ==
The first station in Witney was opened on 14 November 1861 as the terminus of the Witney Railway. When the East Gloucestershire Railway opened a 14-mile-10-chain (22.7 km) extension of the line to Fairford on 15 January 1873, a new station was opened to the south of the first station. This was situated 200 yards (180 m) to the east of Witney Goods Junction where the new line branched away from the Witney Railway just before the former terminus. Left on a short spur line, the old terminus was closed to passenger traffic, but remained in use as a goods station.

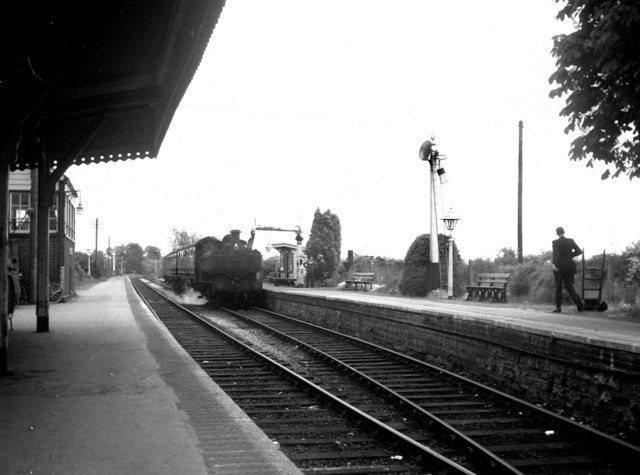
Station looking eastwards in June 1962.

The new station was a joint station for both the Witney Railway and East Gloucestershire Railway until the pair were taken over by the Great Western Railway in 1890. It was provided with two platforms, a booking office and a waiting room; a small signal box was situated on the Up side. Unlike the timber structure at Witney's first station, the main station building was built of Cotswold stone. Adjacent to the station building was a gentlemen's toilet and the signal box, and beyond a characteristic corrugated iron pagoda shed. Between the signal box and the station building there was also a small wooden office for the stationmaster but this was hidden by the bushes and shrubs of the station gardens. The only structure on the Down platform was a basic wooden shelter. As Witney was the principal intermediate station on the line, water columns were provided on both platforms. Beyond the bridge carrying Station Road over the line, which was at the western end of the station, was a loading dock. In the third week of January 1940, King George VI arrived at the station on the Royal Train to inspect troops stationed in the Witney area.

In 1957, it handled 44,000 tons of goods and 66,000 parcels which helped maintain the line in operation during the years prior to its closure. However, only 7,000 passengers were booked during the same period. In the early 1960s, with the gradual transfer of traffic to road and the decline of key industries which had used the railway, the line was unable to justify its existence on the basis of passenger receipts alone. On 18 June 1962, the East Gloucestershire Railway was closed throughout and Witney station closed to passengers. The track on the former East Gloucestershire line was lifted to a point to the east of the Emma's Dyke bridge, which provided an adequate headshunt for the nearby loading dock.

Full closure of the station followed in c. 1965 together with the redundancy of 13 railway workers. The track through the station was lifted in Winter 1968 and the station building was demolished in January 1969. The first Witney station closed to goods on 2 November 1970, the same day on which the line was closed throughout.

Preceding station	Disused railways	Following station
Brize Norton and Bampton; Line and station closed	Great Western Railway; East Gloucestershire Railway	South Leigh; Line and station closed

== Present day and future ==
After remaining derelict for over a decade, the site was redeveloped as an industrial estate.

The station has been proposed for reopening, mainly on a site to the south of the town with a potential park and ride scheme, as part of a wider project to restore the railway to Carterton via Witney and Eynsham.
