= Kempster =

Kempster may refer to:

- Kempster, Wisconsin, United States

== People with the surname ==
- Albert Kempster (1875–?), British sport shooter
- André Gilbert Kempster (1916–1943), awarded the George Cross posthumously
- Christopher Kempster (1627–1715), English stonemason and architect
- James Kempster (1892–1975), Irish cricketer
- Ken Kempster (born 1967), Canadian musician
- Michael Kempster, British barrister and judge in Hong Kong
- William Kempster (1914–1977), British artist
- William Kempster (mason) (1651–1717), English stonemason
