= Matthew Freud =

British businessman (born 1963)

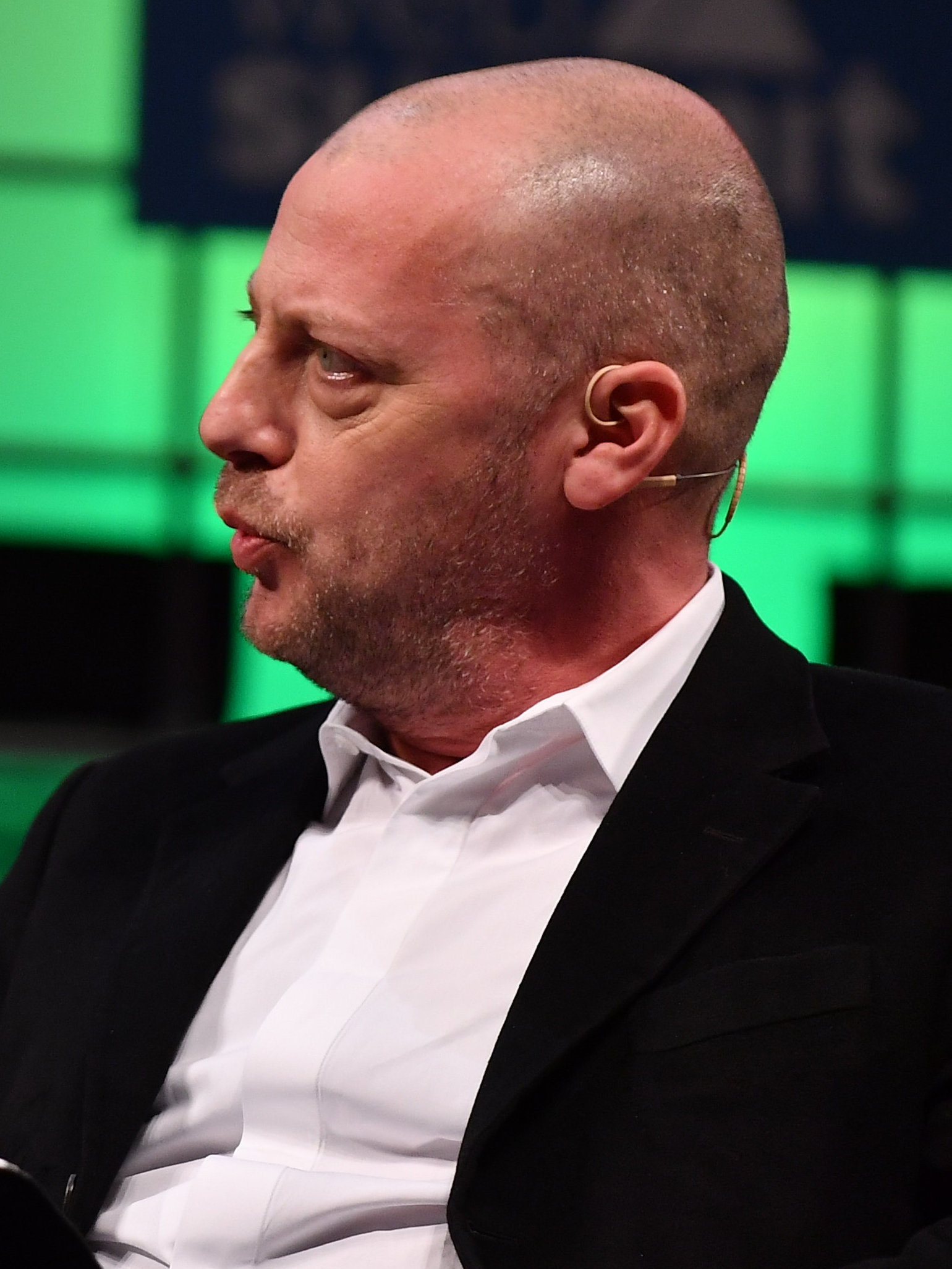
- Freud in 2017
- Born: Matthew Rupert Freud; 2 November 1963 (age 62); London, England
- Education: Westminster School
- Occupation: Public relations executive
- Spouses: Caroline Hutton (m. 1991; div. 2000); Elisabeth Murdoch (m. 2001; div. 2014)
- Children: 5
- Parents: Sir Clement Freud; June Flewett

Matthew Rupert Freud (born 2 November 1963) is a British entrepreneur and public relations executive and head of Freud Communications, an international public relations firm in the United Kingdom.

== Early life ==
Freud was born in London, the youngest of five children born to actress June Flewett and the writer and German-born British politician Sir Clement Freud. Matthew Freud's sister is television interviewer Emma Freud. His great-grandfather was Sigmund Freud. He is the nephew of the artist Lucian Freud and (by former marriage) of the writer Lady Caroline Blackwood, and his cousins include fashion designer Bella Freud, and novelists Susie Boyt, and Esther Freud.

== Career ==
Matthew Freud founded Freud Communications in 1985. Adam Curtis in his documentary Century of the Self describes Matthew Freud as a star in the "new culture of public relations and marketing in politics, business and journalism" that rose in the Clinton-Blair years. In 2009 PRWeek called Freud "the most influential PR professional in the UK".

Freud, his sister Emma and brother-in-law Richard Curtis, sit on the board of Trustees for Comic Relief.

In May 2005, in partnership with Piers Morgan, he acquired ownership of the Press Gazette and the British Press Awards in a deal worth £1million. Several major newspapers boycotted the event citing an apparent conflict of interest as one of the reasons.

According to the Sunday Times Rich List in 2020, Freud is worth an estimated £170 million, a decrease of £10m from the previous year.

== Personal life ==
Freud's first wife was Caroline Hutton with whom he had two sons: George Rupert Freud and Jonah Henry Freud. Caroline then married the 9th Earl Spencer, brother of Diana, Princess of Wales, from whom she was divorced in 2007.

His second wife was Elisabeth Murdoch, second daughter of media magnate Rupert Murdoch, head of News Corporation. When the couple met in 1997, she was pregnant with a second child by her first husband and business partner, Elkin Pianim (the son of Ghanaian financial and political mogul Kwame Pianim). The couple married 18 August 2001 at Blenheim Palace; they have two children, a daughter born in 2000 and a son born in 2007. They divorced in 2014. During the divorce, it emerged that Freud had fathered a child with a mutual friend two years previously, born in 2012.

In November 2012, Freud was banned from driving for six months and fined £830 after police caught him driving at 117 miles per hour (188 km/h) in a borrowed Ferrari on the M5 motorway. His son was asleep in the front of the car at the time of the offence. Exeter Magistrates' Court was told that he had already incurred nine penalty points on his driving licence in the previous three years–two fixed penalties for speeding and one for using a mobile phone while driving.

He is a friend of several members of the Conservative party, including George Osborne and David Cameron. Freud has also invited Cameron to many events and is part of the so-called 'Notting Hill Set' of influential Conservative-linked figures. During their marriage, Murdoch and Freud owned Burford Priory in Oxfordshire, and hence were also considered members of the Chipping Norton set.

== See also ==
- Freud family
