= Edmund Harman =

English barber-surgeon

Edmund Harman (c.1509–1577) was the barber-surgeon of Henry VIII of England and a member of his Privy Chamber. He served alongside Thomas Wendy and George Owen.

In February 1536, Harman was made bailiff of Hovington, and given the keeping of the manor-place and the farm thereto belonging, with fees of 5l. a year; during the minority of [blank] Berkley, lord Berkley, son and heir of the late lord Berkley, deceased; with all profits belonging to [him].

Harman became a prominent Burford resident in the 1540s when he was one of the beneficiaries of Henry VIII's Dissolution of the Monasteries. He and his wife were granted Burford Priory.

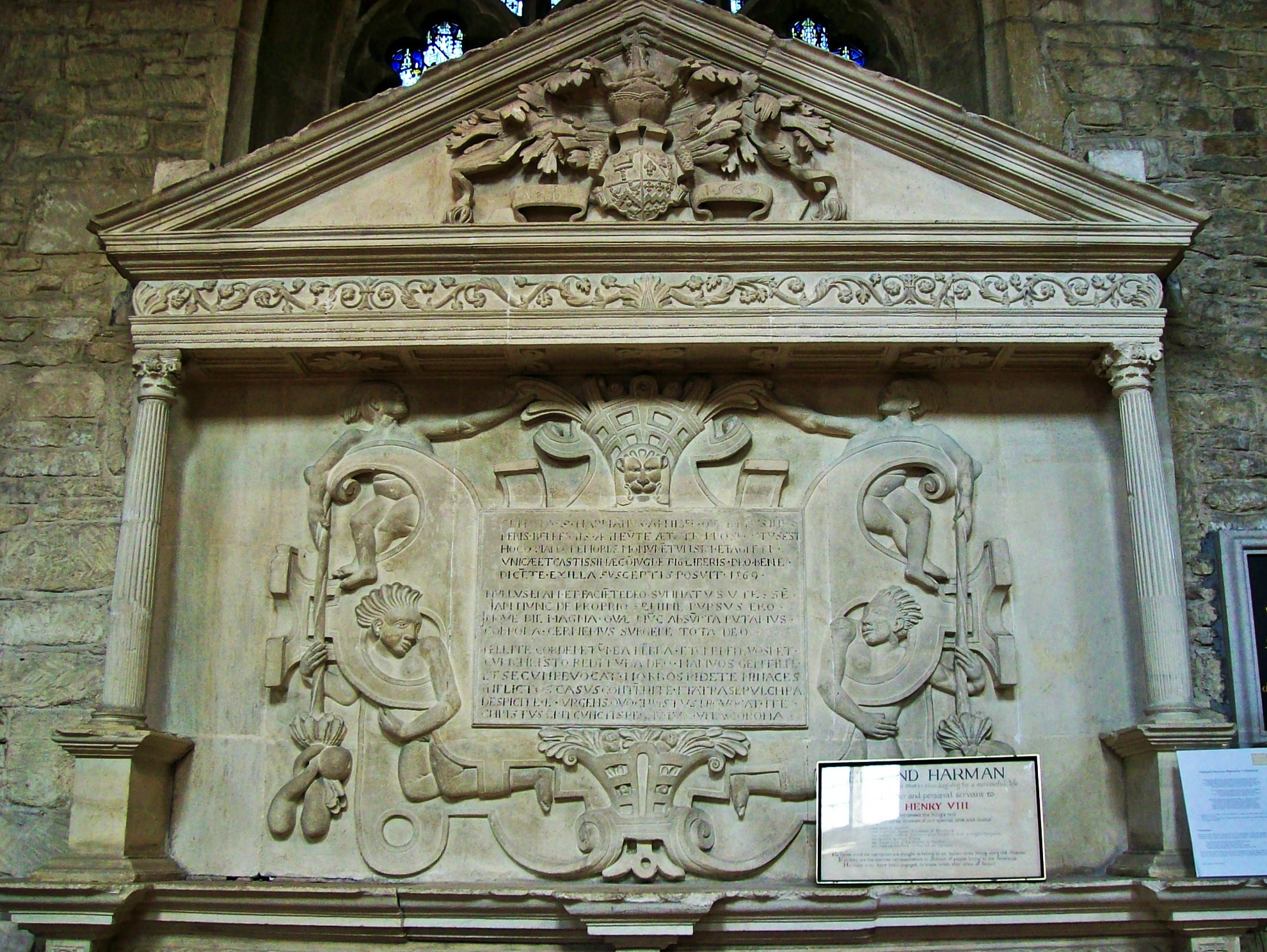
Memorial in St John's Church Burford, featuring carvings of Native Americans

Edmund Harman was buried at St John the Evangelist Church, Taynton, Oxfordshire. However, his lavishly carved monument is in the Church of St John the Baptist, Burford, Oxfordshire, a mile and a half away. There used to be an empty vault in front of the monument, which – together with the wording on the plaque – suggests that he intended to be buried there. The monument shows his nine sons and seven daughters, of whom only two girls survived their parents. The monument also features what may be the earliest depiction of Native Americans in Britain. Four South American Indians with feathered headdresses and a jaguar surround his memorial plaque. No explanation is given in the Latin inscription for their presence, and it has been suggested that the family was involved in the early exploration and trade with the Americas. The American images on Edmund's memorial may have been copied from illustrations in a Flemish book that appeared a few years earlier.
