= St Mary's Church, North Leigh =

- Parish Church of St Mary, North Leigh
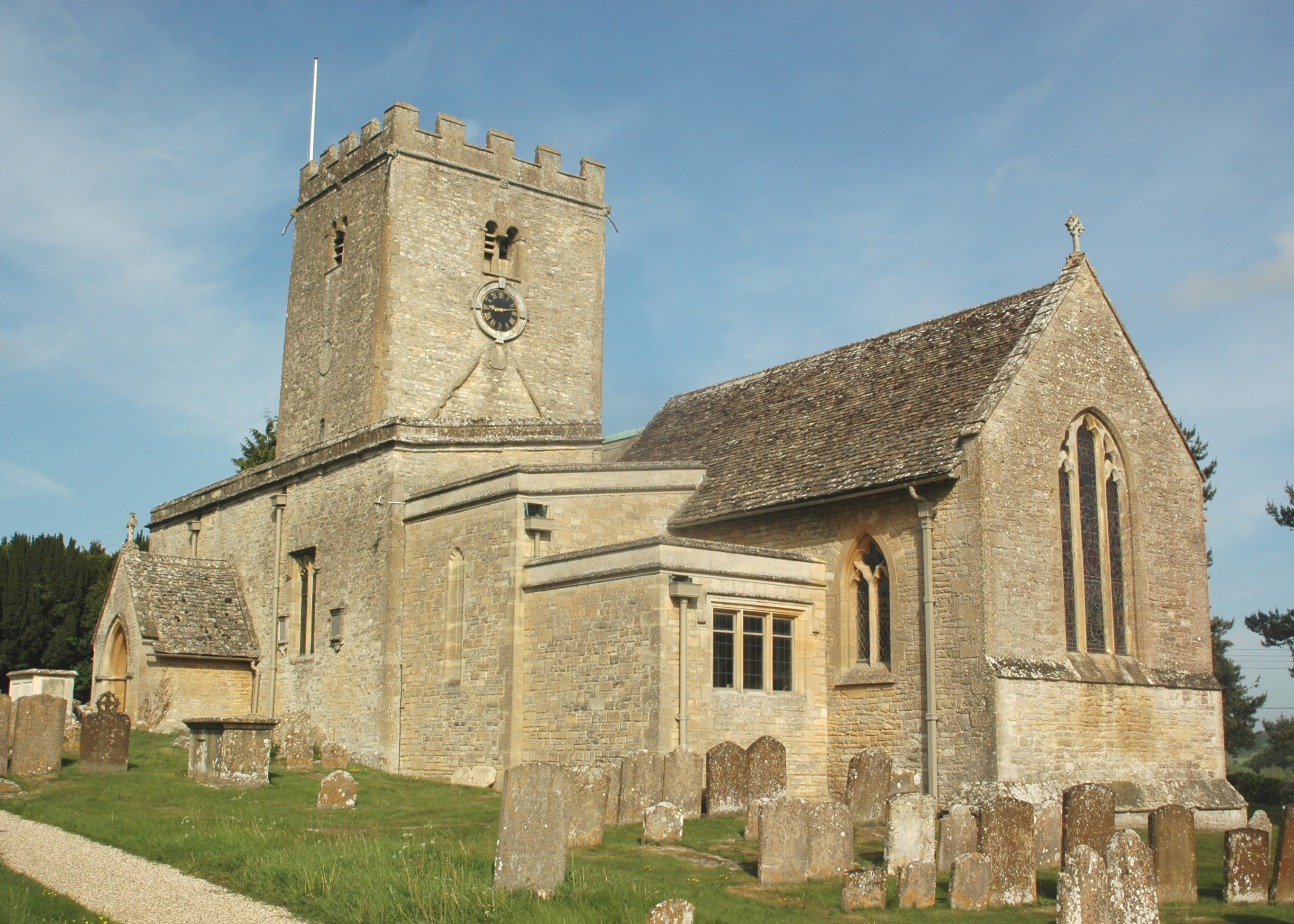
- St Mary's Church, North Leigh
- 51°49′13″N 1°26′22″W
- OS grid reference: SP 38733 13657
- Location: North Leigh, Witney, Oxfordshire OX29 6TT
- Country: England
- Denomination: Church of England
- Website: St Mary's – North Leigh

History
- Dedication: Saint Mary

Architecture
- Style: Anglo-Saxon, Early English Gothic, Decorated Gothic, Perpendicular Gothic and Georgian
- Years built: circa 1050–1725

Administration
- Province: Canterbury
- Diocese: Oxford
- Archdeaconry: Oxford
- Deanery: Witney
- Parish: St. Mary, North Leigh

Clergy
- Vicar: Rev. Margaret Dixon

The Parish Church of Saint Mary, North Leigh is the Church of England parish church of North Leigh, a village about 3 miles (5 km) northeast of Witney in Oxfordshire.

== From Anglo-Saxon foundation until the Reformation ==
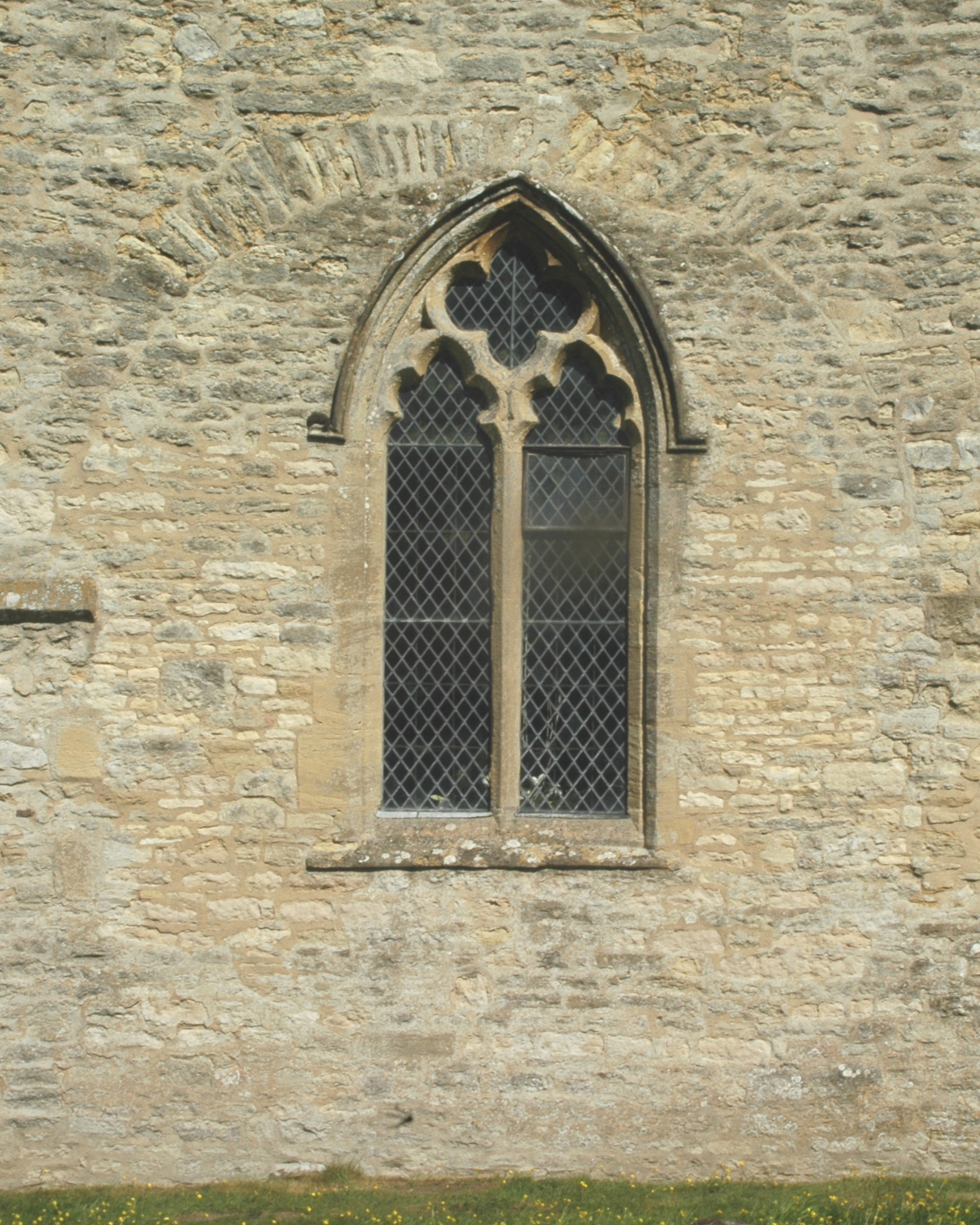
11th-century Anglo-Saxon arch blocked since the 12th century, with Decorated Gothic window added in the 14th century.

The bell tower is late Anglo-Saxon, probably built in the first half of the 11th century. There was an Anglo-Saxon nave west of the tower, and presumably an Anglo-Saxon chancel east of it. In the latter part of the 12th century the nave was abandoned and its arch in the west wall of the tower was blocked up. A new nave was built east of the tower in place of the Anglo-Saxon chancel, with north and south aisles flanking it and a new chancel extending further east, all in the Early English Gothic style.

Early in the 13th century the arch between the tower and the new nave was enlarged, a third chancel was built east of the 12th-century one, and the 12th-century chancel was made part of the nave. Early in the 14th century both aisles were extended westwards, flanking the tower on both sides, and arches were cut in the tower to link with the aisle extensions. New Decorated Gothic style windows were inserted in the east end of the chancel, the west end of the nave and along the south aisle.

In the middle of the 14th century the division between the nave and chancel was moved back to where it had been in the 12th century. The 13th-century chancel arch was removed, but its imposts remain in the north and south walls of the chancel. An arch was cut in the north wall of the chancel, presumably to connect with a new chapel.

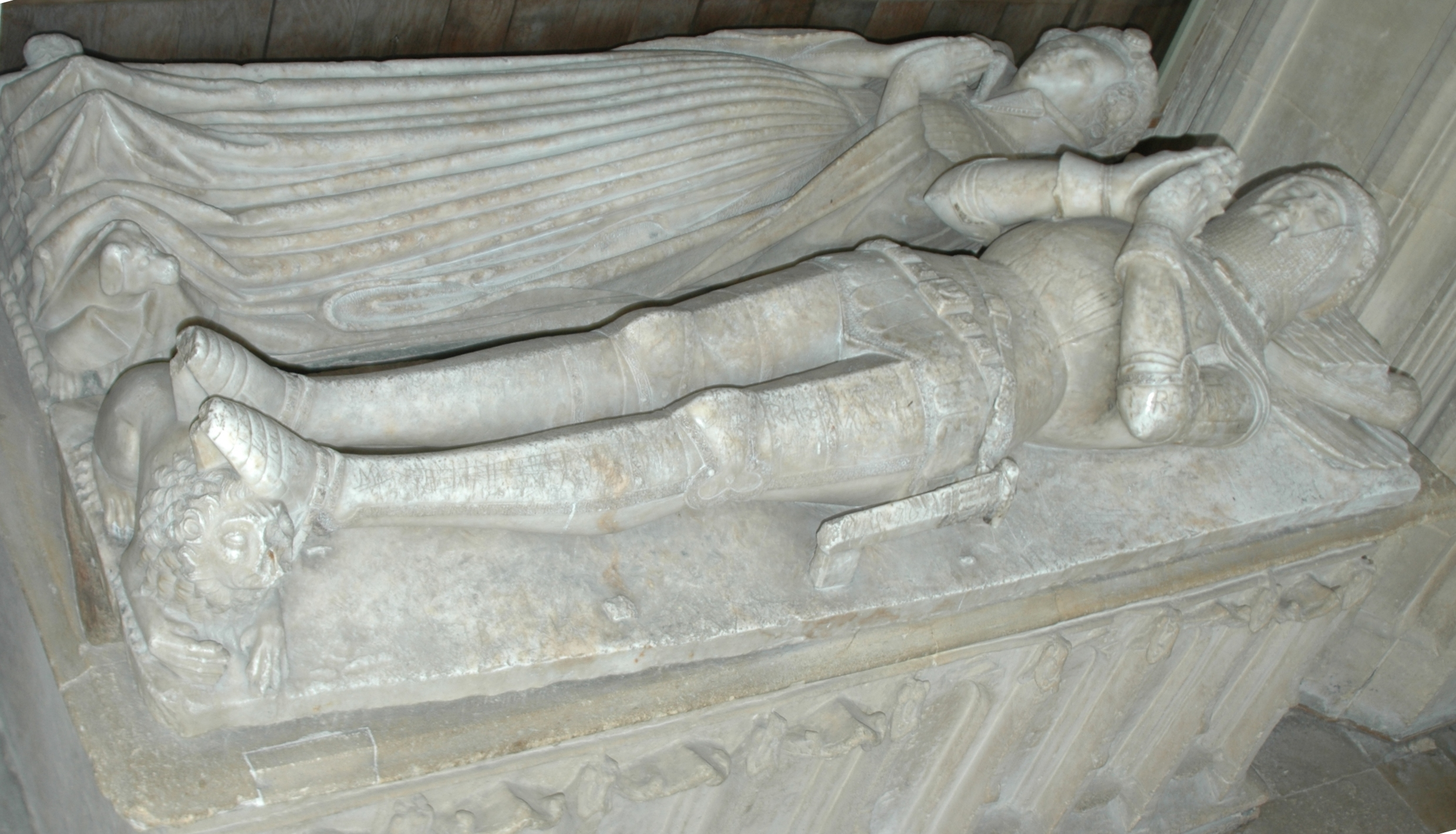
Alabaster effigies of Sir William Wilcote (died 1410) and his wife

After 1439 this chapel was replaced with a new Perpendicular Gothic style chapel, which has fine fan vaulting of unusually high quality for a parish church. It was built for Elizabeth Wilcote, widow of the then Lord of the Manor. She had been widowed twice and lost two of her sons, and had ordered the chapel as a chantry to offer Mass for them. Parts of the chapel's original 15th-century stained glass survive in its windows. Also in the 15th century, new Perpendicular Gothic windows were inserted in the north and south aisles.

== Since the English Reformation ==
The parents of the Civil War Speaker of the House of Commons, William Lenthall, came from North Leigh and are buried in the church. A memorial tablet in the Wilcote chantry chapel commemorates them.

In 1723, John Perrott, Lord of the Manor, engaged Christopher Kempster of Burford to refit the church and build a burial chapel for the Perrott family to the north of the north aisle. Kempster was a mason who had worked for Sir Christopher Wren on churches in London. Kempster linked the Perrott chapel and the north aisle by an arcade of Tuscan columns. The chapel is lit by tall, round-headed Georgian windows with plain glass. On the walls are several large, ornate 18th-century memorials to members of the Perott family.

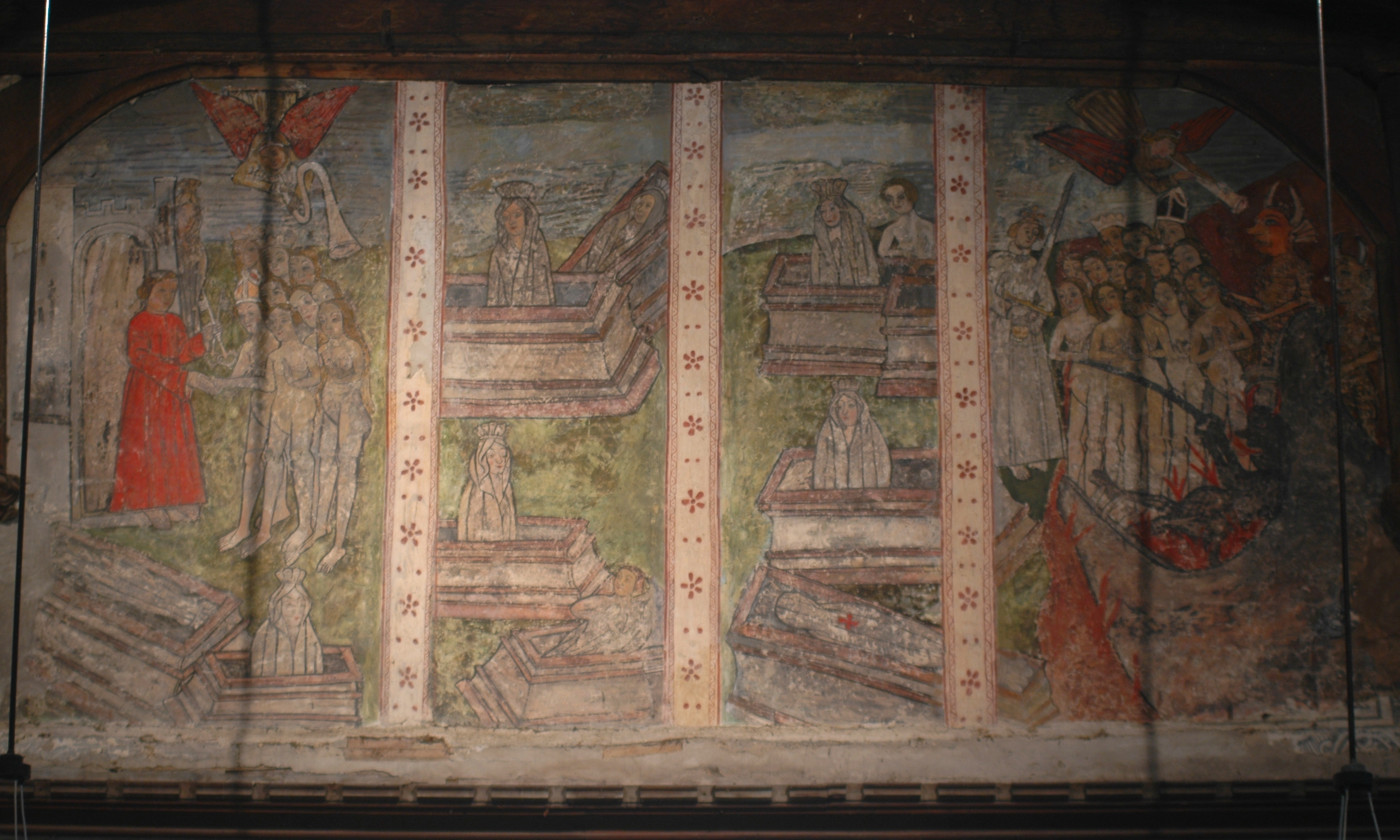
15th-century Doom painting in nave, above entrance to chancel

In 1864 the Gothic Revival architect GE Street restored the church. Street unblocked and re-glazed windows that Kempster had blocked up for Perrott, and reinstated the Norman font that Perrott had had removed to the churchyard for use as a water butt. Kempster had inserted round-headed Georgian windows in the north and south walls of the chancel. Street replaced these with ones to match the restored Decorated Gothic east window. During the works a 15th-century Doom painting at the east end of the nave was uncovered and restored. Street also had the south porch rebuilt.

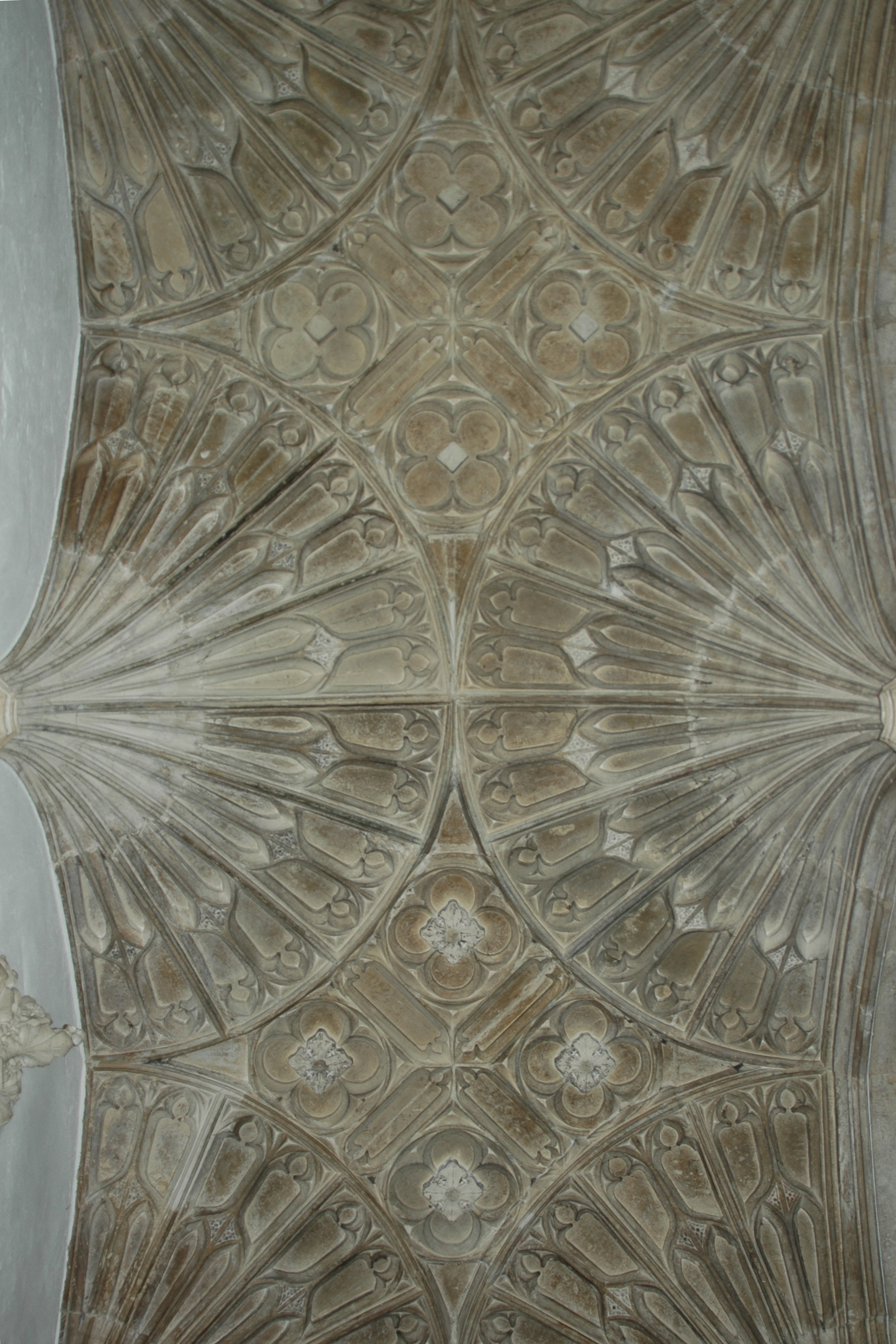
Perpendicular Gothic fan-vaulted ceiling of Wilcote chantry chapel

== Bells ==
There are records of the church tower having bells since the 16th century. By 1875 there was a ring of five, hung for change ringing, which that year were recast by Mears and Stainbank of the Whitechapel Bell Foundry to make the current ring of six bells.

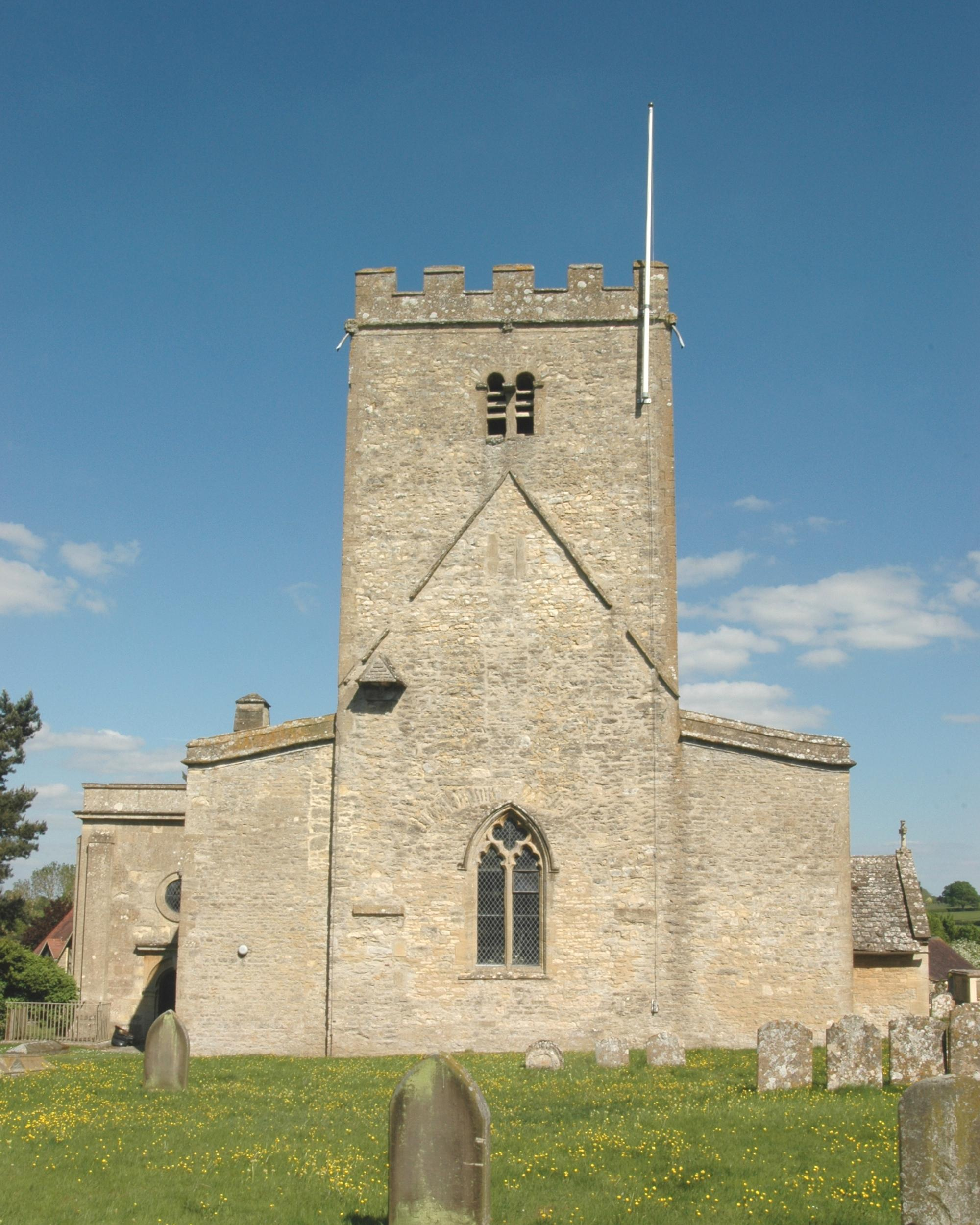
West end of St. Mary's church, where the Saxon nave formerly stood.

== Sources and further reading ==
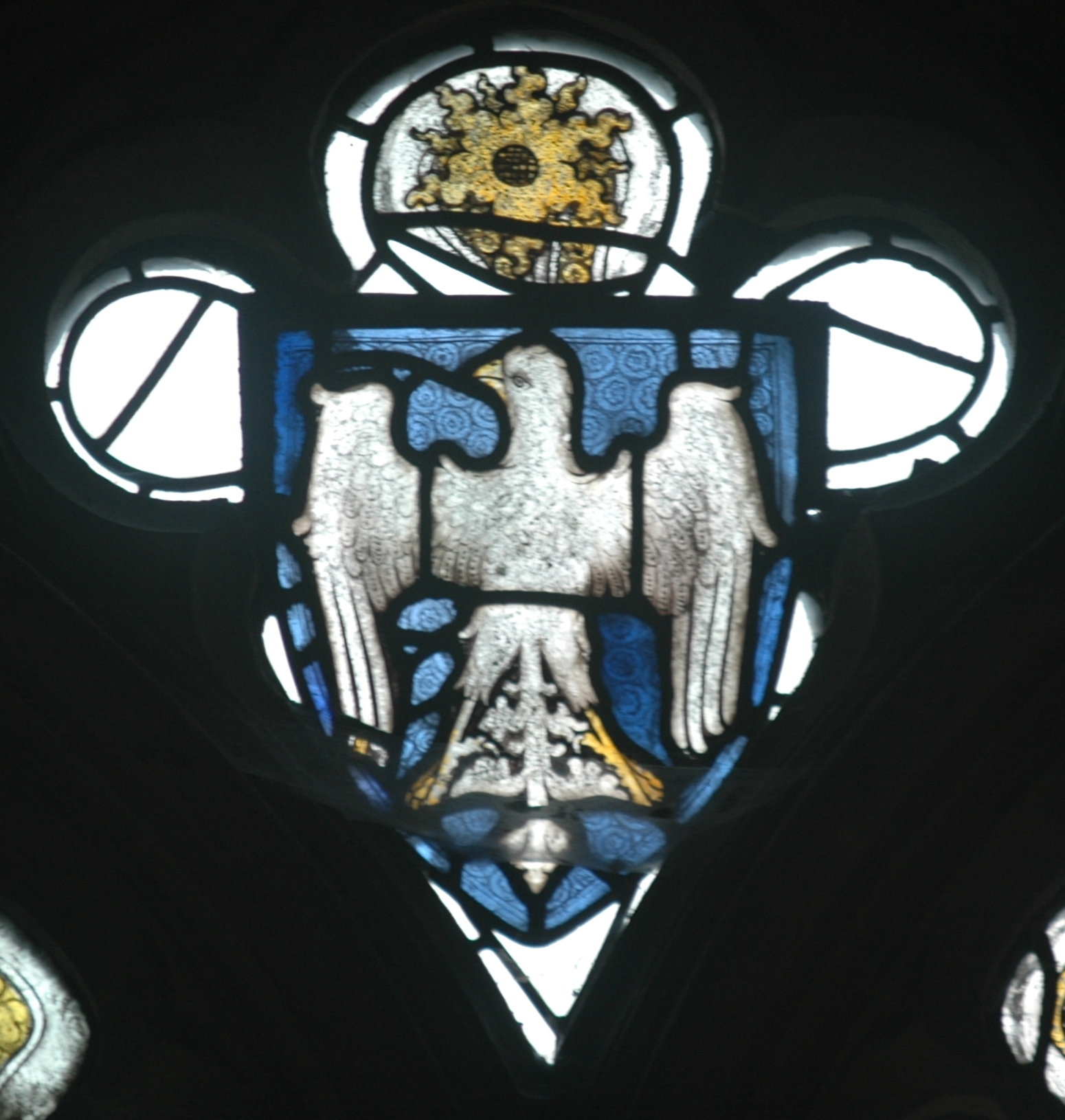
Stained glass quatrefoil in Wilcote Chapel east window

- Crossley, Alan; Elrington, CR, eds. (1990). "North Leigh: Church". A History of the County of Oxford. Victoria County History. Vol. 12: Wootton Hundred (South) including Woodstock. London: Oxford University Press for the Institute of Historical Research. pp. 231–235. ISBN 978-0-19722-774-9.
- Long, E. T. (1972). "Medieval Wall Paintings in Oxfordshire Churches" (PDF). Oxoniensia. XXXVII. Oxfordshire Architectural and Historical Society: 106–107. ISSN 0308-5562.
- Sherwood, Jennifer; Pevsner, Nikolaus (1974). Oxfordshire. The Buildings of England. Harmondsworth: Penguin Books. pp. 719–720. ISBN 0-14-071045-0.
