= George Owen (physician) =

English physician and politician

George Owen (1499–1558), from Oxford and Godstow, Oxfordshire, was an English royal physician and politician.

Owen was born in the Diocese of Worcester and educated at Merton College, Oxford. In 1520 he became a Fellow of the college.

George Owen was the royal physician to several members of the Tudor dynasty: Henry VIII, Edward VI, and Mary I. He served alongside Thomas Wendy and Edmund Harman. He was also a Member of the Parliament of England for Oxfordshire in 1558.

Owen owned Wolvercote Manor and Mill, north of Oxford. In 1552, he petitioned the King to prevent the Mayor of Oxford from enclosing Wolvercote Common where the villagers of Wolvercote traditionally had grazing rights. Following the dissolution of Rewley Abbey, he also acquired the manor of Yarnton.

Following the Dissolution of the Monasteries, St Alban Hall, Oxford, became the property of the Crown, and Henry VIII granted it to Owen, who conveyed it to Sir John Williams and Sir John Gresham. In 1547 they transferred the hall to John Pollard and Robert Perrot, who sold it to the Warden and Fellows of Merton College.
