= Christopher Kempster =

English stonemason and architect

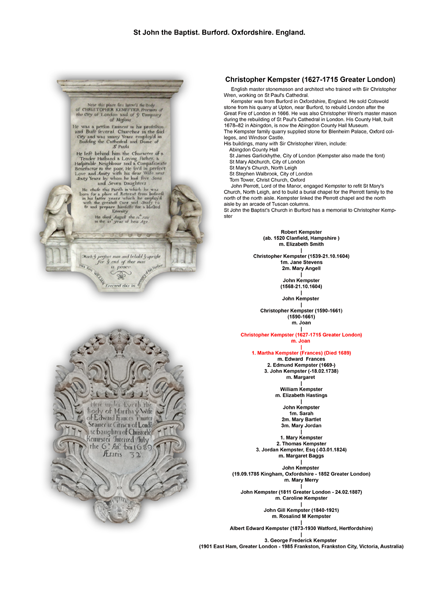
- Memorial at the Church of St John the Baptist, Burford
- Born: 27 March 1627; Burford, Oxfordshire, England
- Died: 12 August 1715 (aged 88); Burford, Oxfordshire, England
- Burial place: Burford, Oxfordshire, England
- Occupation(s): Stonemason; architect
- Notable work: St Paul's Cathedral
- Spouse: Joane (c.1646)
- Children: William Kempster
- Parents: Christopher Kempster (father); Joanne (mother)

Christopher Kempster (1627–1715) was an English master stonemason and architect who trained with Sir Christopher Wren, working on St Paul's Cathedral.

== Biography ==
Kempster was from Burford in Oxfordshire, England. He sold Cotswold stone from his quarry at Upton, near Burford, to rebuild London after the Great Fire of London in 1666. He was also Christopher Wren's master mason during the rebuilding of St Paul's Cathedral in London. His County Hall, built 1678–1682 in Abingdon, is now the Abingdon County Hall Museum. The Kempster family quarry supplied stone for Blenheim Palace, Oxford colleges, and Windsor Castle.

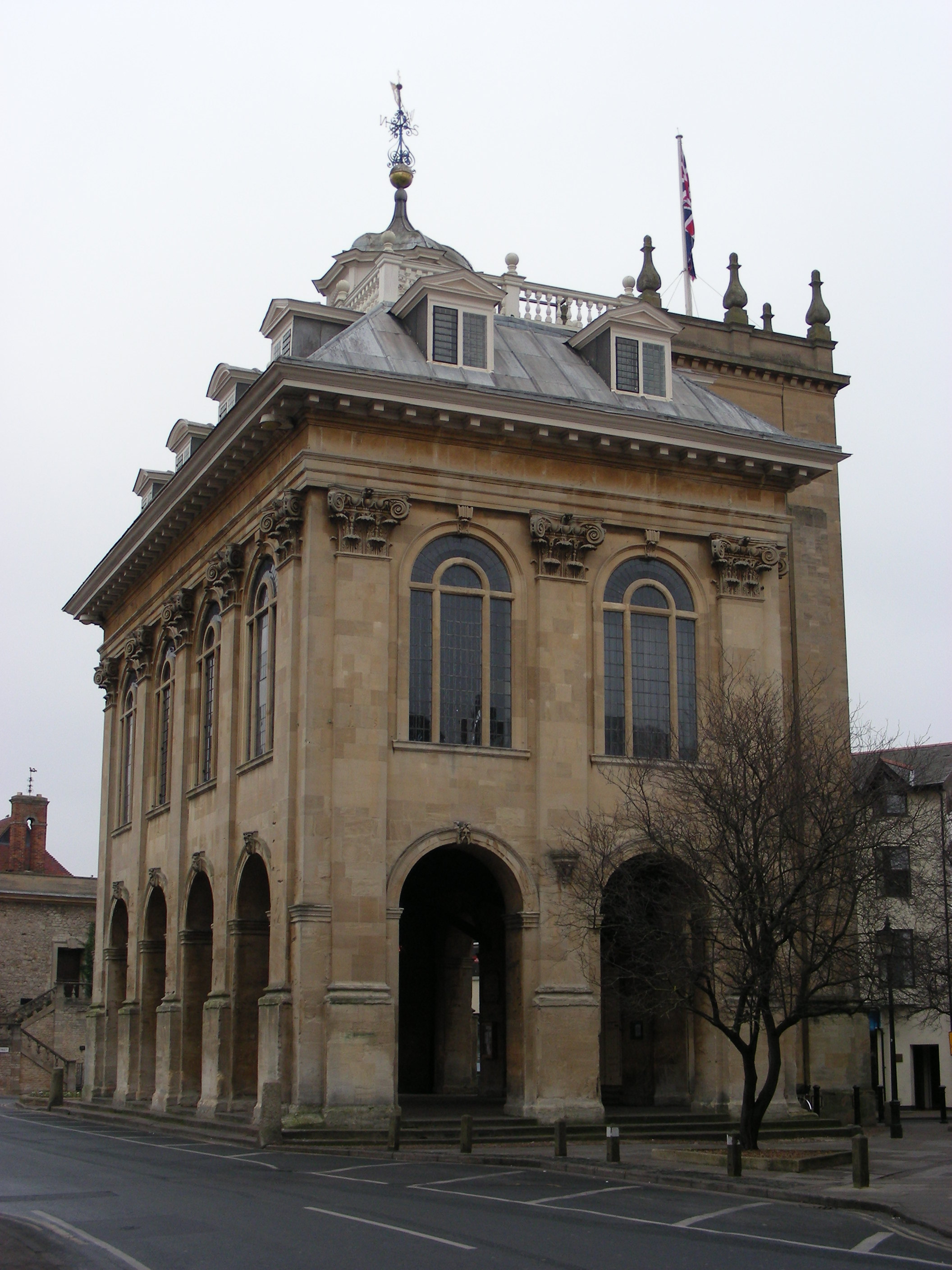
Kempster's County Hall in Abingdon, Oxfordshire, built 1678–1682, now a museum

His buildings, many with Sir Christopher Wren, include:

- Abingdon County Hall
- St James Garlickhythe, City of London (Kempster also made the font)
- St Mary Abchurch, City of London
- St Mary's Church, North Leigh
- St Stephen Walbrook, City of London
- Tom Tower, Christ Church, Oxford

John Perrott, Lord of the Manor, engaged Kempster to refit St Mary's Church, North Leigh, and to build a burial chapel for the Perrott family to the north of the north aisle. Kempster linked the Perrott chapel and the north aisle by an arcade of Tuscan columns.

St John the Baptist's Church in Burford has a memorial to Christopher Kempster.
