= William Kempster (mason) =

English stonemason (1651–1717)

- Born: 7 October 1651; Upton, Burford, Oxfordshire, England
- Died: 10 March 1717 (aged 65); Garlick Hill, London, England
- Occupation: Stonemason
- Notable work: St Paul's Cathedral; Geometric Staircase
- Spouse: Mary Smith
- Children: 2 daughters
- Parents: Christopher Kempster (father); Joan (mother)

William Kempster (1651–1717) was an English master stonemason who worked with Sir Christopher Wren on St Paul's Cathedral.

== Biography ==
William Kempster was the son of another stonemason, Christopher Kempster, from Burford in Oxfordshire, England, with a family quarry of Cotswold stone at Upton, near Burford. The Kempster family quarry supplied stone for Blenheim Palace, Oxford colleges, and Windsor Castle. In 1705, he was elected Master of the Masons' Company.

Following his father, William Kempster was Christopher Wren's master mason with a team of masons during the rebuilding of St Paul's Cathedral in London. He carved the Dean's Door in 1690. He was the main contractor at St Paul's from 1700 to 1717. He maintained day books with payment records. Initially, his father acted as a partner. During 1706–8, Kempster had a team of 65 men working on the southwest tower and the vaults of St Paul's. Kempster received £9,019 for his work on St Paul's. He bought Portland stone and Purbeck stone for his work.

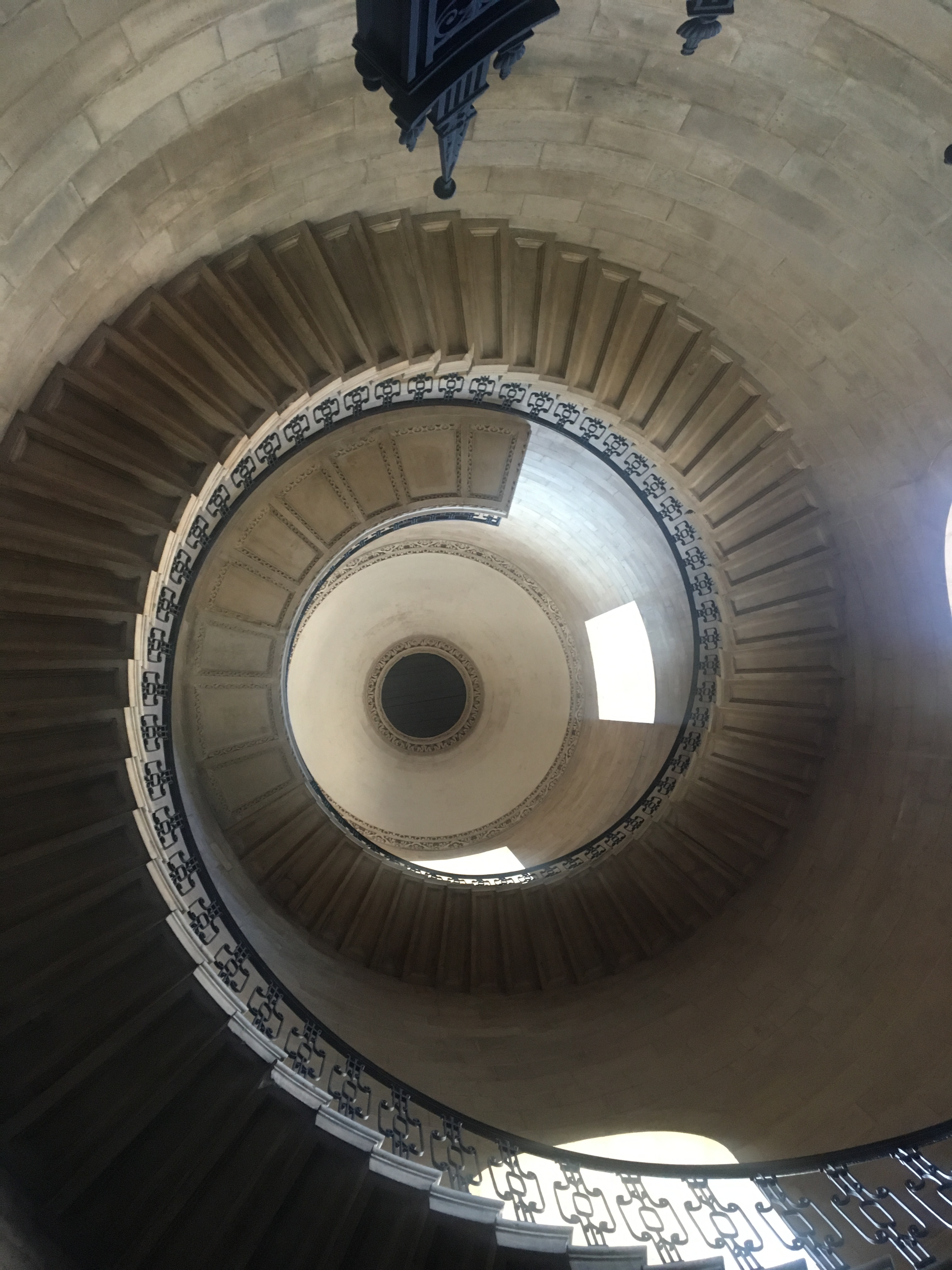
The Geometric Staircase at St Paul's Cathedral, designed by Christopher Wren and built by William Kempster

== Geometric Staircase ==
The Geometric Staircase, a helical cantilevered staircase with 88 stone stairs designed by Christopher Wren, was built by Kempster in the southwest tower of St Paul's and completed in 1710. The steps are only embedded about 150mm into the walls since they are mainly supported by the steps below. The staircase featured in the 1994 film The Madness of King George, the 2004 Harry Potter film, Harry Potter and the Prisoner of Azkaban, and the 2009 Guy Ritchie film Sherlock Holmes.

== Other works ==
Kempster's other work included commissions at the following places:

- Balls Park
- Burford Priory
- Henley Church
- Hertingfordbury Park
- The Old Bailey
- Queen's Square (now 26 Queen Anne's Gate)
- Winchester Palace (1683–5)

He also worked for the new coffee houses such as those at All Saints, Blackfriars, Ludgate, and St Paul's, as well as public houses including the Crown in Milk Street, the Dog Tavern at Garlick Hill, and the Haunch of Venison in Bow Lane.

Kempster died while still working in 1717 at Garlick Hill, London.

== Bibliography ==
- Mobus, Melody Ann Clara (2011). The Burford Masons and the Changing World of Building Practice in England 1630–1730 (PDF). UK: The Open University.
- Stephenson, Judy (2015). The organisation of work and wages in the London building trades in the long eighteenth century (PDF). UK: The London School of Economics.
- Stephenson, Judy Z. (April 2019). "Working days in a London construction team in the eighteenth century: evidence from St Paul's Cathedral" (PDF). The Economic History Review.
