= Chipping Norton set =

Media people living near Chipping Norton

The Chipping Norton set is a group of media, political and show-business acquaintances who have homes near the market town of Chipping Norton in Oxfordshire, England. Chipping Norton is located approximately 75 miles from London. The group gained media attention in the wake of the News International phone hacking scandal, which directly involved members of the group.

The term "Chipping Norton set" was included in the 19th edition of Brewer's Dictionary of Phrase and Fable, published in 2012.

== Members ==
In 2012, The Daily Telegraph identified the following people as being part of a "Chipping Norton Set":

- Charlie Brooks, racehorse trainer, and his wife Rebekah (née Wade), former CEO of News International, editor of The Sun and News of the World. Brooks was introduced to Wade by Jeremy Clarkson. The Brookses have holidayed with Elisabeth Murdoch and Matthew Freud on their yacht, and the Oppenheimer-Turners at their house in Saint-Tropez. Rebekah Brooks has been friends with Murdoch for more than a decade. In 2001, she was a guest at Murdoch's wedding to Freud and among a select group invited to her bridal shower. The Brookses live in Sarsden, Oxfordshire, four miles from Chipping Norton. A September 2012 interview with Charlie Brooks was headlined "Founder member of the Chipping Norton Upset", Brooks explained that the "Upset" is a family in-joke, in response to the claim that he and his wife are part of the Chipping Norton set, which he called "a figment of one journalist's imagination".
- David Cameron, Baron Cameron and his wife Samantha (née Sheffield). Chipping Norton lies in the constituency of Witney, for which David Cameron, the former Prime Minister of the United Kingdom, former leader of the Conservative Party and Foreign Secretary as a peer, was the Member of Parliament. Cameron's home is in Dean. Cameron chose Chipping Norton as part of his peerage title in 2023.
- Jeremy Clarkson, broadcaster and journalist, then presenter of Top Gear. Prime Minister David Cameron appeared as Top Gear's The Stig in a video message for Clarkson's 50th birthday. Clarkson writes a column for The Sun, which is owned by News International. Clarkson's Farm is filmed nearby Chipping Norton and Chadlington.
- Sir Charles Dunstone, chairman and co-founder of Carphone Warehouse.
- Sir Tony Gallagher, property developer, owner of Gallagher Estates.
- Steve Hilton and Rachel Whetstone. Hilton was Cameron's director of strategy, and his wife Rachel is the chief communications officer at Netflix. They live in Burford. Hilton and Whetsone were godparents to the Camerons' deceased son, Ivan.
- Alex James, author, cheesemaker, and bassist of Blur. James owns a 200-acre farm in Kingham, 4 miles south-west of Chipping Norton. James has hosted an annual food and music festival on the farm. The inaugural 2011 event left creditors owed close to £1m when the promoters of the fair went bankrupt. James was photographed with Clarkson and Cameron at the 2011 festival. James and Jamie Oliver have presented The Big Feastival, a food and music festival since 2012.
- Elisabeth Murdoch, CEO of media production company Shine Limited, daughter of News Corporation CEO Rupert Murdoch, and sister of News Corporation executive and former chairman of BSkyB James Murdoch. Elisabeth Murdoch was then married to Matthew Freud, owner of Freud Communications, and the couple owned Burford Priory. Clarkson has stated that Murdoch and Freud live in Burford, "which to most people in Chipping Norton, myself included, is basically France."
- Emily Oppenheimer Turner, journalist and painter, and William Turner, businessman. Emily is the granddaughter of Sir Philip Oppenheimer, who ran the De Beers diamond empire; she is married to William Turner, director of The Hospital Group, Ltd. and former head of Sky Pictures, a division of BSkyB. Turner worked as the head of Carlton films at Carlton Communications during David Cameron's time as director of corporate affairs at Carlton.
- Sir Howard Stringer, chairman of Sony Corporation, appointed by David Cameron to his Business Advisory group.

Other prominent local residents include Anthony Bamford, Baron Bamford, chairman of J. C. Bamford (JCB) and his wife Carole, who live in Daylesford House in nearby Daylesford, Gloucestershire; Anthony Bamford is a major donor to the Conservative Party.

== Notable gatherings ==
=== Brookses' wedding reception ===
The guestlist for Rebekah and Charlie Brooks' wedding reception near Chipping Norton in 2009 was described by The Guardian as a "powerlist." Guests included then-Prime Minister Gordon Brown, leader of the Conservative Party David Cameron, and the CEO of News Corporation Rupert Murdoch. Rebekah Brooks was the editor of The Sun at the time of her marriage.

The couple repeated their vows in a lakeside ceremony in front of 240 guests, who included Jeremy Clarkson (at whose house the couple met). Other guests included Will Lewis, Charles Dunstone, Dow Jones chief executive Les Hinton, and Rupert Murdoch's children James and Elisabeth, and Elisabeth's husband Matthew Freud.

=== 2010 Christmas dinner ===
On 23 December 2010, James Murdoch and Prime Minister David Cameron were guests at a dinner at the home of Rebekah and Charlie Brooks. Brooks was by then chief executive of News International (a subsidiary of News Corporation), and Murdoch was chairman of BSkyB in which News Corporation has a controlling minority stake. The meal took place two days after Cameron had been forced to replace the Business Secretary, Vince Cable, as the minister scrutinising News Corporation's bid for BSkyB. Until April 2012 Cameron had refused to issue an outright denial that he spoke about BSkyB during the dinner with Murdoch in 2010.

Murdoch confirmed that they had discussed the bid at the dinner in his testimony to the Leveson Inquiry in April 2012. James Murdoch said he sought assurances at the meal that Jeremy Hunt, who took over Cable's brief, would be more "objective"; Cable had told undercover The Daily Telegraph reporters he had "declared war on Mr Murdoch." Cable was referring to James Murdoch's father, Rupert.

In 2011 Cameron was accused of breaking Parliament's ministerial code of conduct by failing to avoid a possible conflict of interest in attending the Christmas dinner; however, he refused to allow an inquiry by Cabinet Secretary Gus O'Donnell. Cameron declared in Parliament that he had "never had one inappropriate conversation" and that he "completely took myself out of any decision-making about this bid". A spokesman later said that Cameron had "not been involved in any of the discussions about BSkyB." James Murdoch has met Cameron twice since he became Prime Minister, at the Christmas dinner at the Brooks' and a lunch at Chequers in November 2010.

Before Murdoch's testimony in April 2012 fellow dinner guest Jeremy Clarkson claimed in July 2011 that Murdoch could not have discussed the BSkyB with Cameron as the Prime Minister and Rebekah Brooks had spent the entire evening discussing sausage rolls. In her testimony to the Leveson Inquiry Brooks stated that she and Cameron had attended a second party a few days later on Boxing Day, at her sister-in-law's house.

=== 'Horsegate' ===
A horse, Raisa, was loaned to Rebekah Brooks by the Metropolitan Police from 2008–2010 and stabled at the Brooks' farm, and was subsequently returned to the police in a "poor condition." In March 2012, David Cameron confirmed that he had ridden the horse with Charlie Brooks before Cameron became Prime Minister in 2010. Cameron had previously stated that he had not. The leader of the opposition, Ed Miliband, said that Cameron was in danger of becoming a symbol of "how leading politicians get too close to the powerful media."

Cameron apologised for a "confusing picture" to emerge over his connection to Raisa. Cameron said that he was sorry to hear that Raisa "is no longer with us... I think I should probably conclude by saying I don't think I will be getting back into the saddle any time soon." Regarding Charlie Brooks, Cameron had earlier told 5 News, "He is a friend of mine of 30 years' standing and a neighbour in my constituency, so that's a matter of record. But since I have been prime minister I think I have been on a horse once, and it wasn't that one." Before Cameron confirmed that he had ridden the horse, Jeremy Clarkson said of the affair that "I can categorically state that he never rode that horse. I do actually live there. It's all rubbish."

== Commentary ==
Nick Cohen wrote in the Observer in May 2012 that "The non-Murdoch press will not shirk our duty to recall the fabulous social whirl that was once the "Chipping Norton Set." We will remind you of how Brooks, Elisabeth Murdoch and Matthew Freud slapped and scratched the backs of David and Samantha Cameron at country homes, while Jeremy Clarkson flitted in and out of their parties – gambolling through the Cotswolds like a portly court fool."

Peter Oborne described the Chipping Norton set as "an incestuous collection of louche, affluent, power-hungry and amoral Londoners", while Christina Odone said that "Chipping Norton remains a state of mind. It's where the stars of Westminster and White City can be machos of the manor, shooting, riding and drinking [...] Top Londoners who can afford the £750,000 per cottage lifestyle here lead a phoney county life where a BlackBerry is charged, not picked [...] Anywhere else in the world, country folk are desperate to appear city sophisticates; it's only in Britain that urbanites invest millions in buying a "country" pedigree."

Comedian Graeme Garden, who has lived locally for 30 years, said, "I can think of more acceptable reasons for Chipping Norton to be put on the map, rather than through any association with sleazy journalism... But Chipping Norton will get over it." The mayor of Chipping Norton said that "We would prefer to be put on the map for more positive things." His wife, the mayoress, added, "Surely people are allowed to have supper at Christmas with their neighbours [...] Such a lot has been made of the celebrity factor. But we have a lot of well-known people in the area [...] because it is a beautiful place, and people are allowed to get on with things."

In his book I, Partridge: We Need to Talk About Alan, fictional conservative ex-BBC presenter Alan Partridge said that he "would love to live in Chipping Norton; Brooks, Cameron, Clarkson, Murdoch. Drinking champagne and laughing our heads off at everyone else."

== See also ==
- Politico-media complex
- News International phone hacking scandal
- Notting Hill set
- Cliveden set
