= Burford Priory =

Country house in Oxfordshire

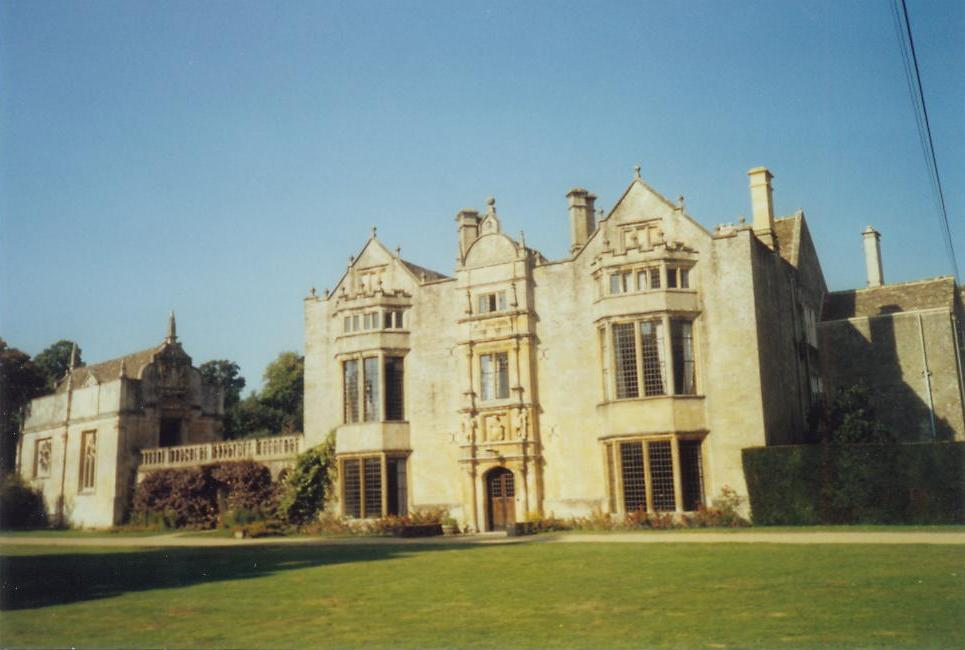

- Location within Oxfordshire
- 51°47′36″N 1°28′45″W
- OS grid reference: SP2499612363

History
- Built: 1580s
- Built for: Lawrence Tanfield
- Rebuilt: 17th century

Site notes
- Restored: 1912
- Restored by: Walter Godfrey
- Owner: Elisabeth Murdoch and Matthew Freud

Listed Building – Grade I
- Designated: 11 September 1955

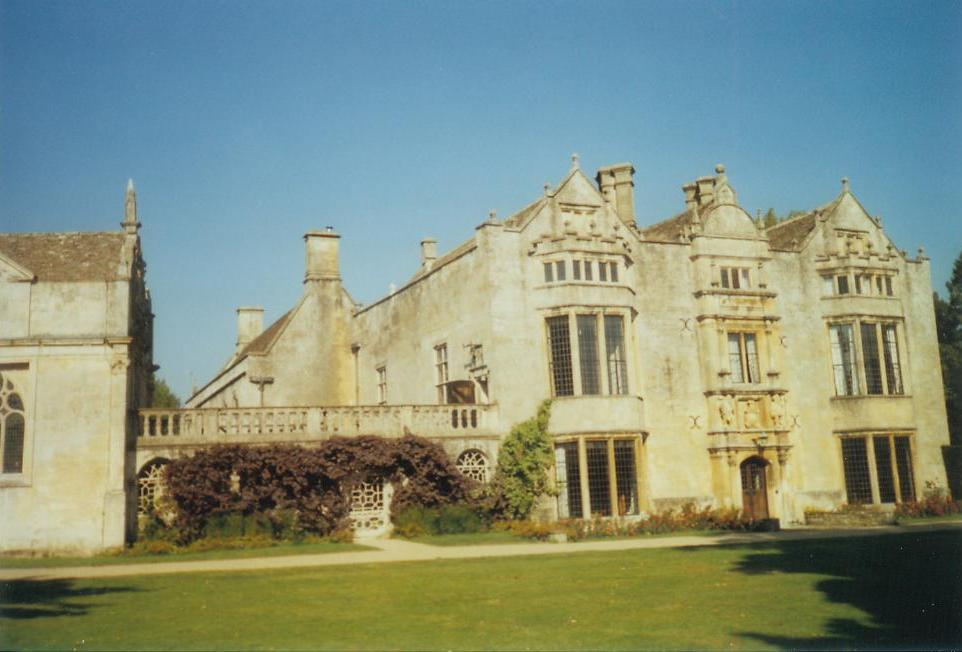
Burford Priory

Burford Priory is a Grade I listed country house and former priory at Burford in West Oxfordshire, England owned by Elisabeth Murdoch, daughter of Rupert Murdoch, together with Matthew Freud.

== History ==
=== Origin ===
The house is on the site of a 13th-century Augustinian hospital. In the 1580s an Elizabethan house was built by Sir Lawrence Tanfield, incorporating remnants of the Priory Hospital. James I stayed at the priory for three nights in 1603. In the 17th century it was remodelled in Jacobean style, probably after 1634 when William Lenthall bought the estate from Tanfield's grandson, the 2nd Viscount Falkland, who had inherited it from his grandfather. Lenthall was one of the overseers of Tanfield's will and had married into his second wife's family. It remained in the Lenthall family until 1828. The Lenthall pictures were housed here until the collection was largely sold in the nineteenth century. In 1828 the house and the Manor of Burford was purchased by the Greenaway family of Little Barrington, and their descendant Nicholas Greenaway Mills is the current Lord of the Manor.

In 1912, the philanthropist Emslie John Horniman MP purchased Burford Priory from Colonel Frank de Sales la Terrière. He restored the house and later the chapel under the supervision of the architect Walter Godfrey.

=== Use by Church of England nuns and monks ===
From 1949 Burford Priory housed The Society of the Salutation of Our Lady, a community of Church of England nuns. In the 1980s the community's numbers dwindled, and in 1987 it became a mixed community including Church of England Benedictine monks. In 2008 the community sold the property and it has now returned to being a private house. After a period of living in rented accommodation, the community moved into a new purpose-built monastery in Worcestershire. The new monastery is on the site of a former farm and has taken the name of the farm becoming Mucknell Abbey.

=== Current ownership ===
The current owners and residents of Burford Priory are media businesswoman Elisabeth Murdoch, her ex-husband Matthew Freud, owner of the public relations company Freud Communications, and their family.

A 2011 party held at the house was attended by the Chipping Norton set.

=== Burials at the priory ===
- Cuthred of Wessex
- Edmund Harman

== Local legend ==
=== Little brown monk ===
The site of the old monks' graveyard is reportedly haunted by a small brown solemn-looking monk surrounded by an aura of sadness, who is said to pass through walls. The monk is often linked to the sound of bells which are reported coming from the old rectory at 2am, occasionally accompanied by the sound of chanting.

=== Gamekeeper ===
A second ghost reported on the grounds, particularly around the old vegetable garden, is that of an elderly gentleman in old-fashioned clothing carrying a flintlock or blunderbuss, who is seen late in the evenings during the month of October but vanishes if approached. The apparition has been linked by Puttick and Yurdan to a gamekeeper wrongly executed for the murder of a servant to William Lenthall (or Lord Abercomb) called John Prior (or Pryor). Puttick reports that the ghost has not been sighted since the nuns took up residence in 1949, and speculates that their prayers may have put it to rest.

=== Poltergeist ===
An unused room in the Priory is also reported to contain an active poltergeist, and a feeling of oppression.
