= Signet, Oxfordshire =

Hamlet in Oxfordshire, England

Coordinates: 51.794°N 1.644°W

Signet
- Location within Oxfordshire
- OS grid reference: SP246106
- Civil parish: Burford
- District: West Oxfordshire
- Shire county: Oxfordshire
- Region: South East
- Country: England
- Sovereign state: United Kingdom
- Post town: Burford
- Postcode district: OX18
- Dialling code: 01993
- Police: Thames Valley
- Fire: Oxfordshire
- Ambulance: South Central
- UK Parliament: Witney

Signet is a hamlet on the A361 road just over 1 mile (1.6 km) south of Burford in Oxfordshire, England. Until 1954 Signet was part of the civil parish of Upton and Signet, which was absorbed into Burford to create the civil parish of Burford and Upton and Signet. The parish had a population of 437 in the 1951 census, the last before the parish was absorbed.
