= Lenthall pictures =

Group of paintings

The Lenthall pictures were a number of paintings owned by the Lenthall family and housed at Burford Priory in West Oxfordshire. The collection was publicly commented on by art historians and tourists. It was largely dispersed in two sales in 1808 and 1833, although some works were retained by the family and sold in the late 20th century.

== The history of the collection ==
Many of the works were acquired by Speaker Lenthall after he purchased Burford Priory in 1637. However, the portraits of the Tanfields is evidence that some of the paintings may have been at Burford when it was purchased from Viscount Falkland. Lenthall was one of the overseers of Sir Lawrence Tanfield's will and had married into the family of his second wife. Some of the paintings may have been owned by Charles I and sold after his execution – a rumour to this effect was mentioned by Harold Nicolson. At least two portraits (including William Lenthall, grandson of Speaker Lenthall) were painted after Speaker Lenthall's death. By 1682, the collection contained 145 pictures.

The collection was commented on by the art historian George Vertue and also by Horace Walpole who offered the opinion that the portraits were "rubbish, but celebrated". The Georgian tourist, John Loveday, visited Burford to see the collection on 2 April 1736. He wrote down a detailed description of the More family painting and mentioned a number of others in the collection.

Two of the religious paintings in the collection, along with the portrait of Thomas More and his family and a number of other portraits were mentioned in Gentleman's Magazine in 1799.

The collection was moved to Besselsleigh (another Lenthall family home) in 1808 when Burford was renovated, but it was largely dispersed in two sales in 1808 and 1833.

== Identifying portraits that were part of the collection ==
Around 1700, inscriptions were added to a number of the portraits in the collection. These inscriptions purported to identify the sitter, although the identification is unreliable. The added inscription was typically in ochre, golden or yellow serifed capitals in the bottom left. Although this positioning, colour and style of inscription is not unique, it does serve to suggest a portrait may have been in the collection when attribution and title have changed.

== Some works in the collection ==
There is an inventory of more than 60 works at Burford (mainly portraits) in the collection in the Oxfordshire Record Office. This was prepared by "Mr Lenthall" and recorded by Thomas Symonds in 1827. The 1833 sale contained 73 lots, the majority of which were portraits. There were nineteen classical or religious subjects and a couple of landscapes and still lifes. The full catalogue can be found on Google Books and there is a transcript with prices on the Getty Provenance Database which also has a partial catalogue of the 1808 sale.

Among the portraits were:

- William Lenthall; Speaker of the House of Commons. John Loveday mentions three portraits of Speaker Lenthall ("in his robes, but drawn in different times of life"). A portrait of Lenthall from Burford was acquired by the National Portrait Gallery, London in 1857, having previously been at Burford. The artist is unknown. A portrait of Speaker Lenthall and his family, attributed to Edward Bower is part of the Parliamentary Art Collection.
- William Lenthall; grandson of Speaker Lenthall, attributed to Samuel King; sitter identified by inscription. Sold at Sotheby's London, 28 May 1998 and again on 5 June 2008. No portrait by King is mentioned in the 1833 catalogue, but there were portraits said to be by Lely and Mireveldt. The provenance given in the 2008 sale was "by descent in the Lenthall family, so this work may not have been included in the 1833 sale."
- Portrait of a Woman, Traditionally Identified as the Countess of Arundel by Cornelius Johnson, signed and dated 1619 It was sold in 1833 and was subsequently part of the Northwick Park collection. It is now in the Yale Center for British Art.
- Charles I by Mytens This was subsequently part of the Northwick Park collection and was sold to "Sabin" in the sale on 25 June 1965.
- Prince Henry by Mytens This was also subsequently part of the Northwick Park collection and was sold to "Johnson" in the sale on 25 June 1965.
- Henrietta Maria by van Dyck
- Chief Justice Tanfield; There is a published copy of this portrait.; This is among the portraits mentioned by John Loveday.
- Lady Tanfield by Mark Garrard (Marcus Gheeraerts the Younger) This is also among the portraits mentioned by John Loveday.
- Sir Alexander Temple by Cornelius Johnson, signed and dated 1620. It has an erroneous inscription identifying the sitter as "Ld Gust Hamilton". Vertue mentions a portrait of Lord Hamilton when he visited Burford in 1729. This may be the portrait he was referring to. Along with the Countess of Arundel and the Countess of Portland, this portrait was subsequently part of the Northwick Park collection and it is now in the Yale Center for British Art.
- Sir Thomas More and Family. This was a copy by Rowland Lockey of a lost original by Holbein. It is dated 1593; Holbein died in 1554. The painting had been at Gubbins in Hertfordshire and how it came into the possession of the Lenthalls is not known, although it may have been borrowed from the More family and never returned. John Aubrey and Anthony Wood viewed it at the Besselsleigh home of Sir John Lenthall in the 17th century, but by 1727 it was at Burford. It was discussed in detail by John Loveday who saw it in 1736. The painting was unsold in the 1808 sale but was offered again and sold in 1833. It was subsequently owned by Walter Strickland, CW Dormer, Sir Hugh Lane, Lord Lee, and EJ Horniman whose widow bequeathed it to the National Portrait Gallery where it remains. It was the centre piece in the exhibition, The King's Good Servant, at the National Portrait Gallery in 1977.
- Oliver Cromwell
- Sir Kenelm Digby
- The Earl of Pembroke as Lord Chamberlain. Loveday says this was by Cornelius Johnson and identifies him as William, Earl of Pembroke.
- The Earl of Holland
- The Countess of Portland signed by Cornelius Johnson and dated 1622. The sitter is identified by an inscription in block letters. Finberg says that the subject is Frances Stuart, later Countess of Portland. Richard Weston did not become Earl of Portland until 1633.
- Sir Philip Sydney by Johnson
- Lady Temple by Mytens
- Elizabeth Finch, Countess of Winchelsea by Marcus Gheeraerts the Younger (1600); sold in 1808 as being by Johnson; exhibited at the Dynasties exhibition in 1995.
- The Earl of Abercorn by Sir Godfrey Kneller. Loveday says the Earl was a relation of the Lenthalls by marriage.
- Duke of Florence & Machiavel his Secretary. Loveday says this was a copy of a painting of the Earl of Chesterfield in Bretby Hall. At Burford, it hung close to the More family portrait.
- Henry Ireton by Walker. Bought by the National Portrait Gallery in 1858. It has an inscription saying General Ireton, but is now described as an unknown man by an unknown artist.
- Elizabeth Tanfield, Countess Falkland by Paul van Somer; this (or perhaps a copy) was subsequently owned by Lord Falkland and apparently now in the collection of the Sarah Campbell Blaffer Foundation, Houston, Texas. It was exhibited at the Nave Museum in Victoria, Texas in 2003.
- Henry Howard, 6th Duke of Norfolk by Gerard Soest; sold in the 1833 sale to George, 3rd Lord Northwick. Acquired by Tate Britain in 1965 (but not currently displayed).

== Some pictures from the collection ==
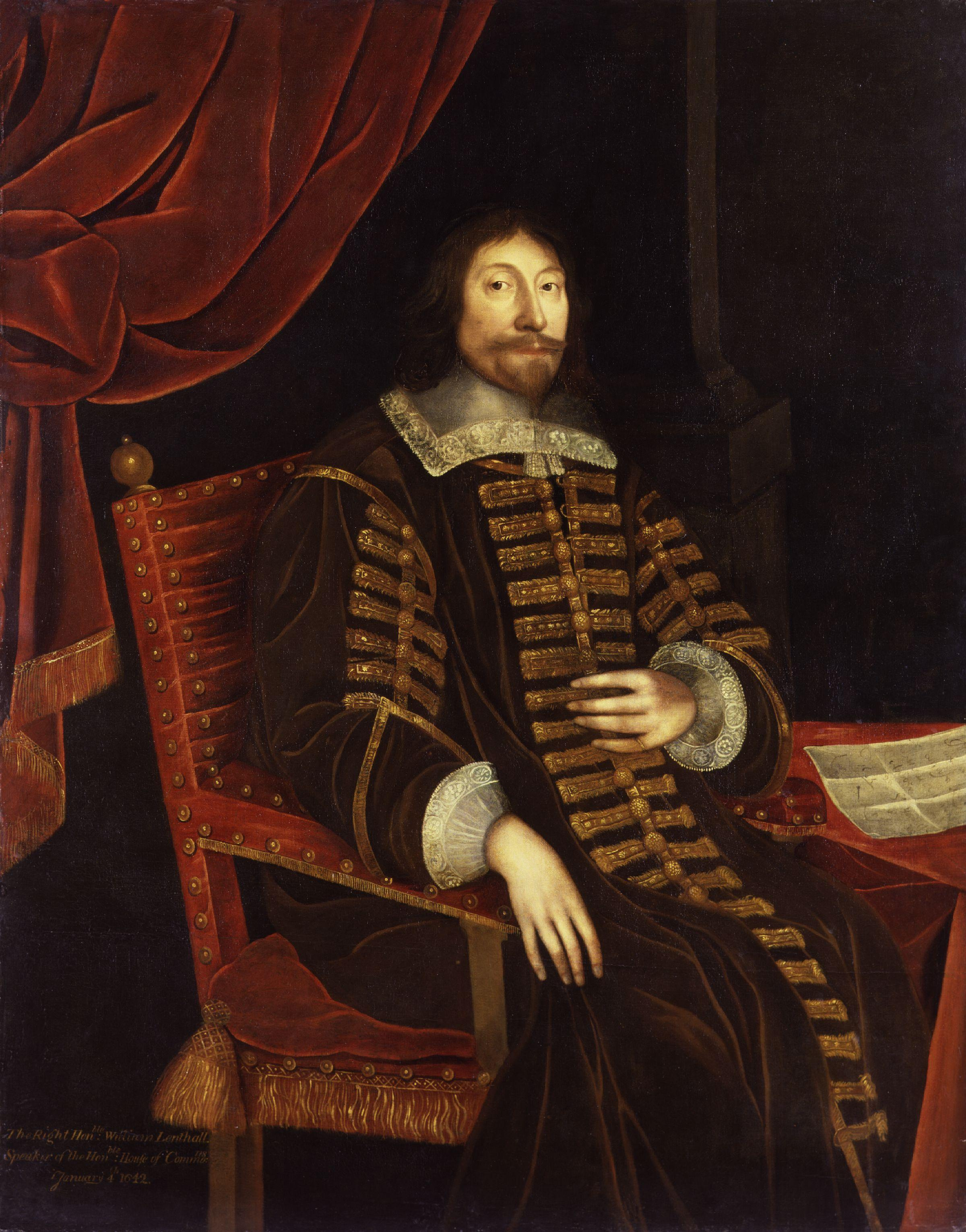
William Lenthall (Speaker Lenthall) in his ceremonial robes; artist unknown

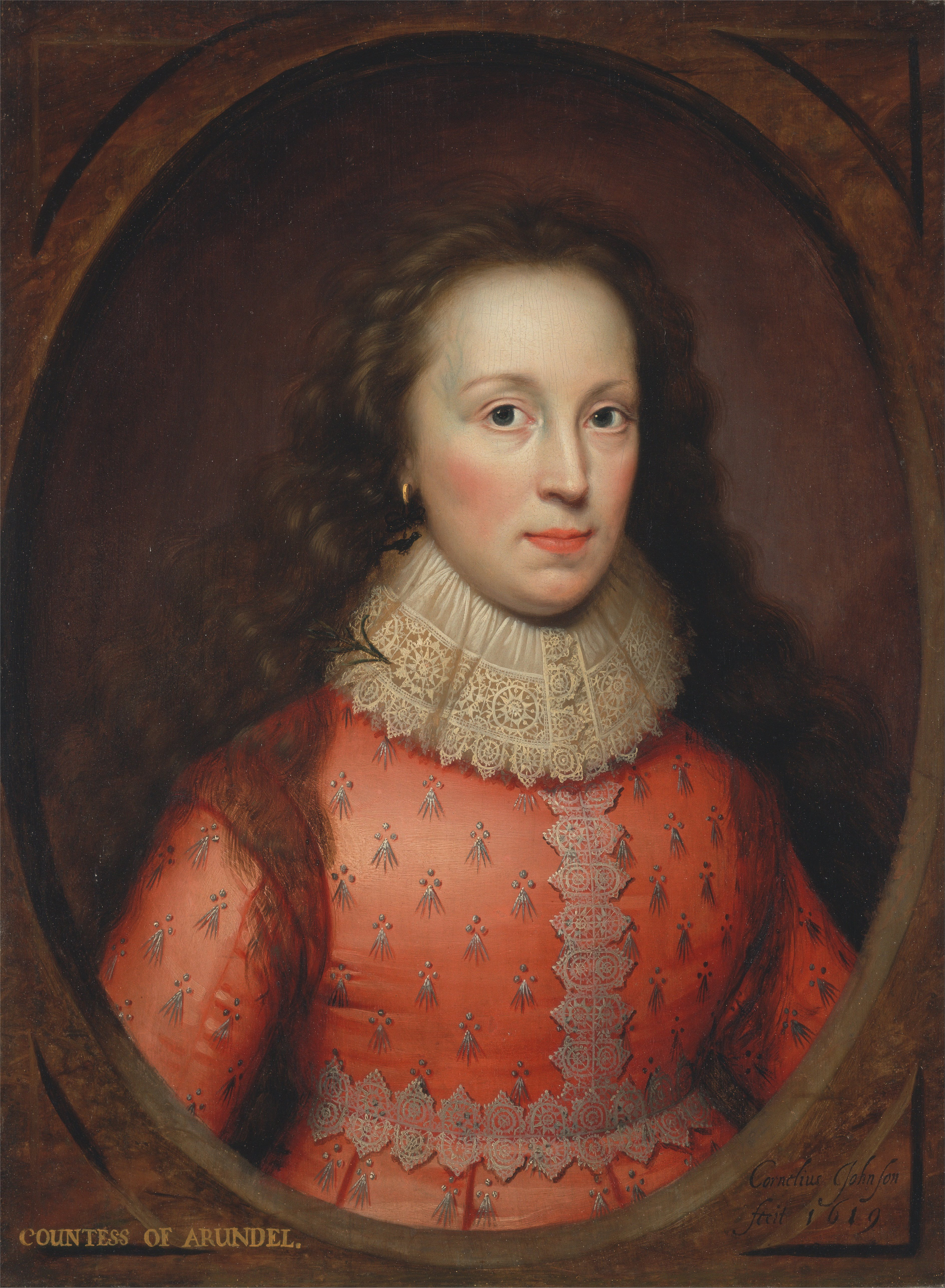
Inscribed Countess of Arundel by Cornelius Johnson, 1619

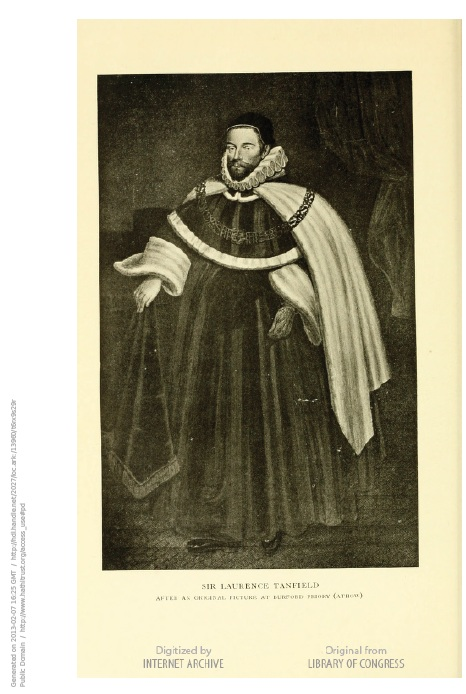
A published illustration of the portrait of Lawrence Tanfield; artist unknown

A published illustration of the portrait of Lady Tanfield; by Mark Garrard (Marcus Gheeraerts the Younger)

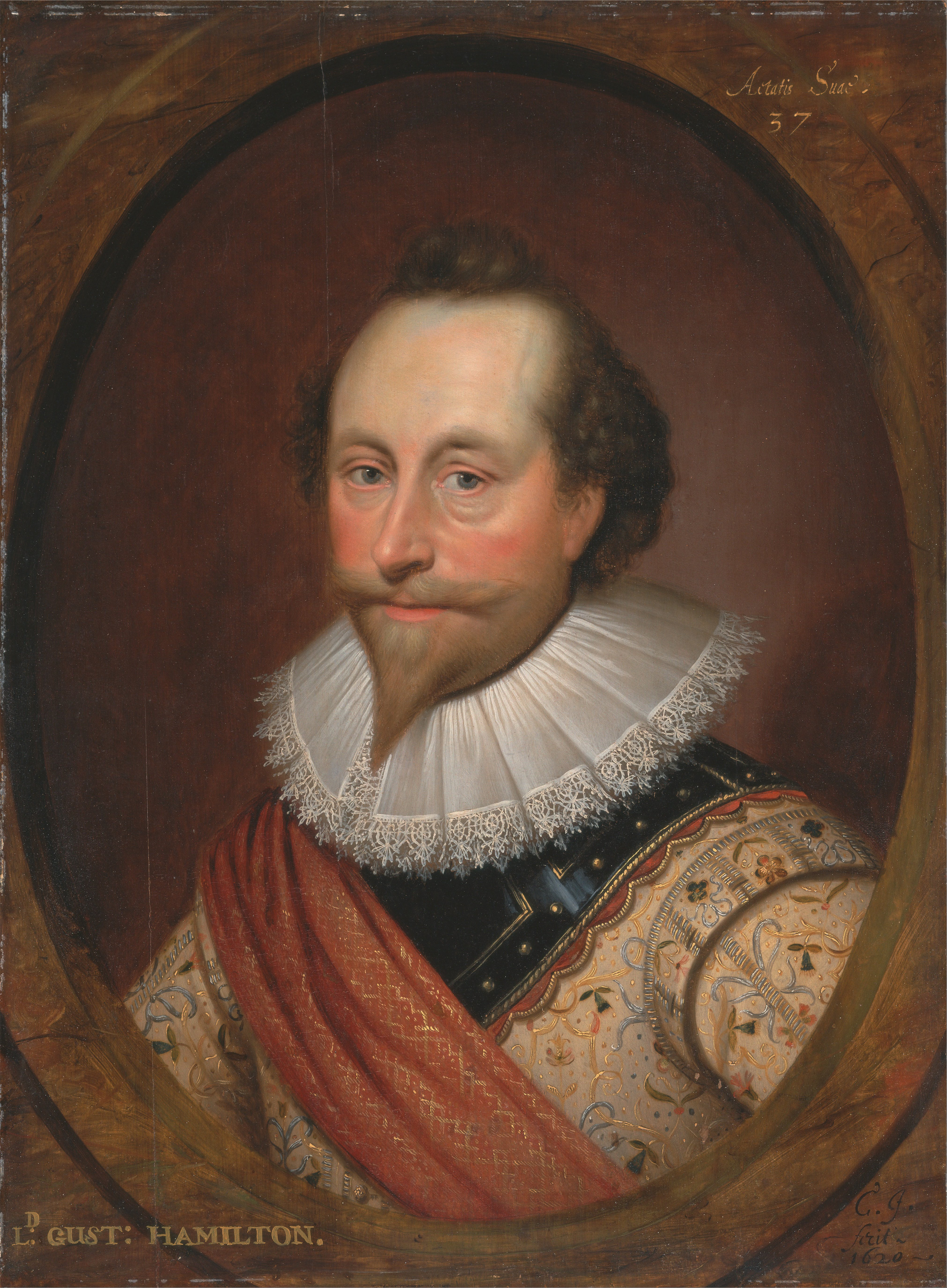
Erroneously inscribed Ld Gust Hamilton, but known to be Sir Alexander Temple; by Cornelius Johnson, 1620

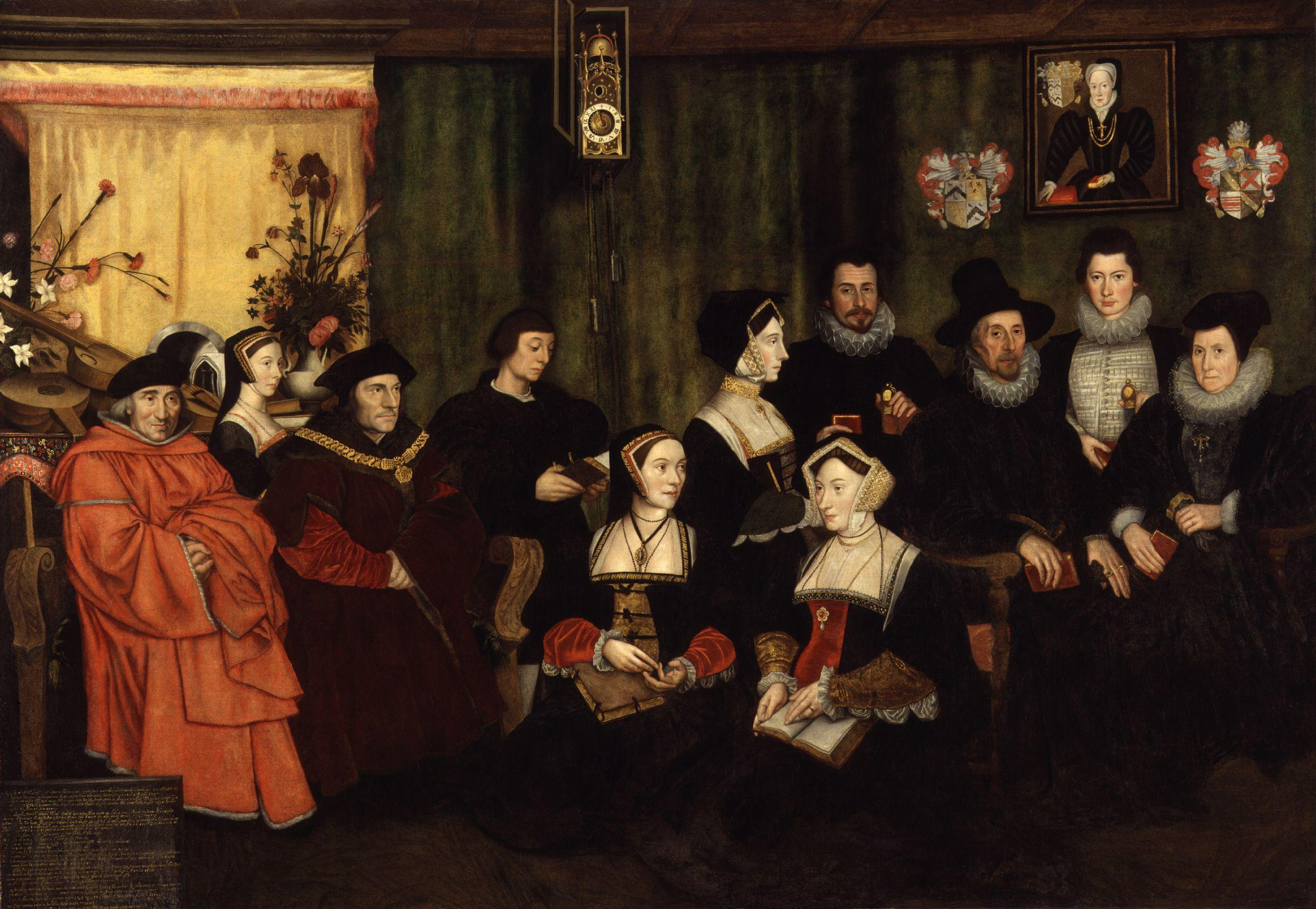
Sir Thomas More and his family, with his gold chain of office; a copy of a lost original by Hans Holbein

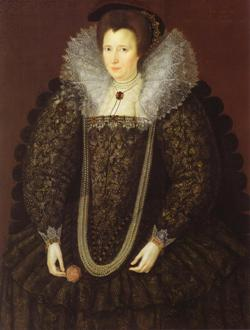
Elizabeth Finch, Countess of Winchelsea, by Marcus Gheeraerts the Younger, 1600 (although attributed to Cornelius Johnson while in the Lenthall collection).

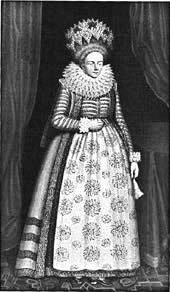
Elizabeth Tanfield, Viscountess Falkland, a print of an original that was attributed to van Somer. This (or a copy) was in the Lenthall collection.

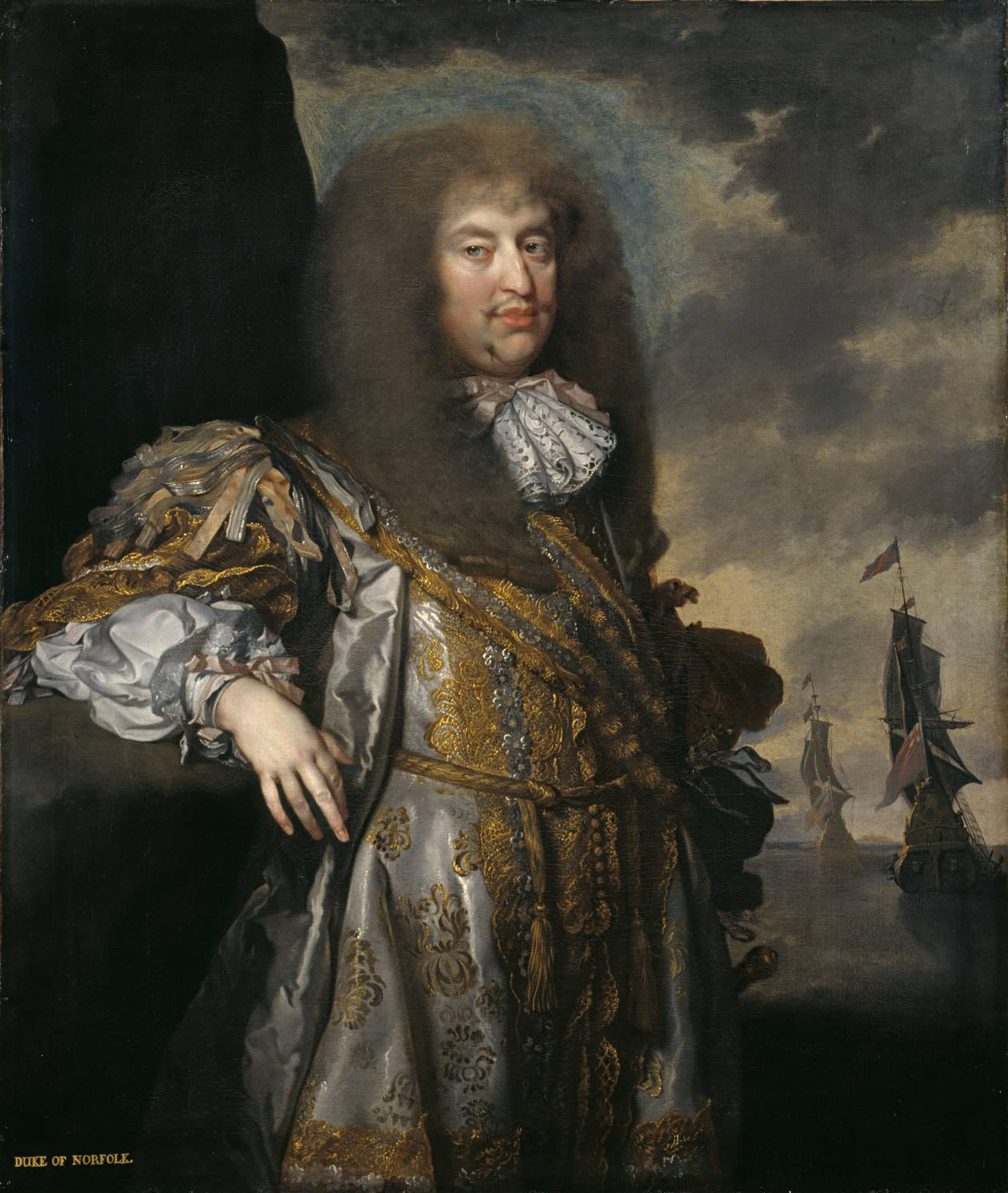
Portrait of Henry Howard by Gilbert Soest, c. 1670–1675
