= André Kempster =

British army officer (1916–1943)

- Born: André Gilberto Coccioletti; 26 October 1916; Westminster, London, England
- Died: 21 August 1943 (aged 26); Philippeville, Algeria
- Burial place: Bone War Cemetery, Algeria
- Military career
- Allegiance: United Kingdom
- Branch: British Army
- Service years: 1939–1943
- Rank: Major
- Service number: 138804
- Units: 145th (8th. Battalion, The Duke of Wellington's Regiment) Regiment, Royal Armoured Corps
- Conflicts: Second World War: North African campaign †
- Awards: George Cross

Major André Gilbert Kempster, GC (26 October 1916 – 21 August 1943), born André Gilberto Coccioletti, was a British Army officer who was awarded the George Cross posthumously "in recognition of most conspicuous gallantry in carrying out hazardous work in a very brave manner" for an act of self-sacrifice in Algeria during the Second World War.

== Second World War ==
On 21 August 1943, near Philippeville [Skikda], Major Kempster was instructing two fellow soldiers how to throw hand grenades from a practice pit. A grenade, which had been thrown by Major Kempster, rolled back into the pit. He attempted to scoop the grenade out of the pit but failed to do so. By this time detonation was due. Without hesitation Major Kempster threw himself on the grenade just before it exploded and received fatal injuries. This act undoubtedly saved the lives of the two other occupants of the pit. Kempster's George Cross was announced in the London Gazette on 9 November 1943.

Kempster's George Cross was sold by Spinks on 28 March 1995 for an expected price of £2,800 – £3,200.
