= Notting Hill set =

The Notting Hill set was an informal group of young figures who were in prominent leadership positions in the Conservative Party, or close advisory positions around the former party leader and Prime Minister, David Cameron. Several members of the group studied at Oxford University.

The term was coined by Derek Conway in July 2004, before Cameron became leader. It was intended to be pejorative, as Conway was one of the 'bed blockers' preventing the party modernising. The term is in reference to all of them having lived in Notting Hill, in west London; by 2006, however, the group's two leading players, Cameron and George Osborne no longer lived in Notting Hill.

The set is often seen as symbolic of the wing of the party that dominated the leadership during Cameron's time as leader of the Conservative Party. It combines traditional centre right economic views with socially liberal and environmentally friendly stances on other issues. The group refer to themselves as the "Smith Square set"; at the time of the 1992 General Election, they were often referred to as the "Brat Pack".

== Members ==
The following have been reported to be its members:

- David Cameron, Shadow Secretary of State for Education and Skills (2005), Leader of the Opposition (2005–2010) and Prime Minister of the United Kingdom (2010–2016)
- George Osborne, Shadow Chief Secretary to the Treasury (2004–2005), Shadow Chancellor of the Exchequer (2005–2010), Chancellor of the Exchequer (2010–2016) and First Secretary of State (2015–2016)
- Michael Gove, Shadow Secretary of State for Children, Schools and Families (2007–2010), Secretary of State for Education (2010–2014), Chief Whip of the House of Commons (2014–2015) and Secretary of State for Justice (2015–2016)
- Ed Vaizey, Minister for Culture, Communications and Creative Industries (2010–2016)
- Nick Boles, Minister of State for Skills and Equalities (2014–2016)
- Steve Hilton, former Director of Strategy at Conservative Campaign Headquarters
- Rachel Whetstone, Hilton's wife and head of Google's division in Europe until June 2015
- Edward Llewellyn, Downing Street Chief of Staff (2010–2016)
- The Baroness Fall, Downing Street Deputy Chief of Staff (2010–2016)
- The Lord Feldman of Elstree, Chairman of the Conservative Party (2010–2016)

== Post-Cameron era ==
Following the resignation of David Cameron, the remaining nine members were fully removed from power by Theresa May, following her victory in the leadership election of June 2016, and the formation of the May Ministry in July 2016. However, following the general election of 2017, Gove made a return to the Cabinet as Secretary of State for Environment, Food and Rural Affairs and also went on to serve in the Cabinets of Boris Johnson (2019–2022) and Rishi Sunak (2022–2024). Cameron himself made a surprise return as Foreign Secretary in November 2023, this time as a member of the House of Lords.

== See also ==
- Chipping Norton set
