= William Lenthall =

Speaker of the House of Commons (1591–1662)

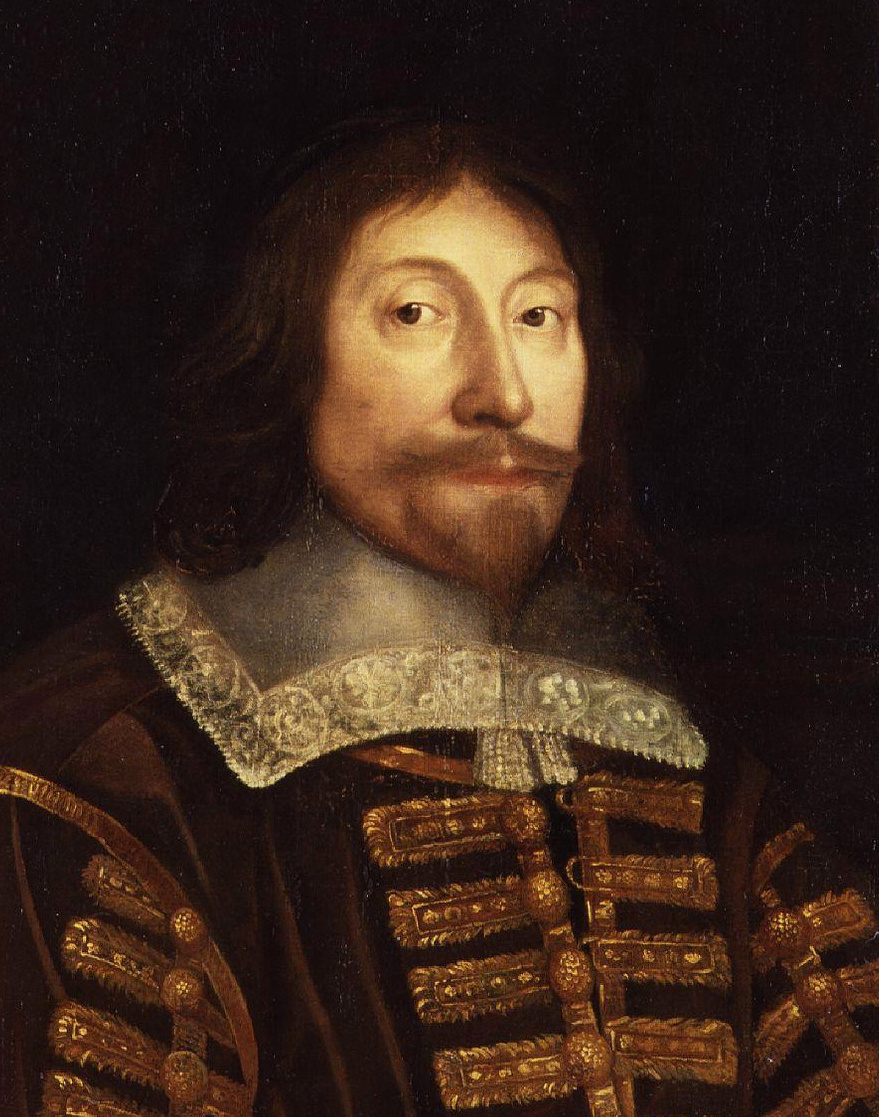

Speaker of the House of Commons
- In office 26 December 1659 – 16 March 1660
- Monarch: (Interregnum)
- Preceded by: William Say (temporary)
- Succeeded by: Sir Harbottle Grimston
- In office 7 May 1659 – 13 October 1659
- Monarch: (Interregnum)
- Preceded by: Thomas Bampfylde
- Succeeded by: William Say (temporary during Lenthall's illness)
- In office 4 September 1654 – 22 January 1655
- Monarch: (Interregnum)
- Preceded by: The Rev. Francis Rous
- Succeeded by: Sir Thomas Widdrington
- In office 6 August 1647 – 20 April 1653
- Monarch: Charles I / (Interregnum)
- Preceded by: Henry Pelham (temporary)
- Succeeded by: The Rev. Francis Rous
- In office 3 November 1640 – 30 July 1647
- Monarch: Charles I
- Preceded by: Sir John Glanville
- Succeeded by: Henry Pelham (temporary, during Lenthall's abandonment of the Speakership)

Master of the Rolls
- In office 1643–1660
- Monarch: Charles I / (Interregnum)

Commissioner of the Great Seal
- In office 1646–1648
- Monarch: Charles I

Chancellor of the Duchy of Lancaster
- In office 1645–1648
- Monarch: Charles I

Personal details
- Born: 1591 Henley on Thames, Oxfordshire
- Died: 3 September 1662
- Spouse(s): Elizabeth Evans, by 1619
- Children: at least 2 sons and 2 daughters
- Education: St Alban Hall University of Oxford, Lincoln's Inn

William Lenthall (1591 – 3 September 1662) was an English politician of the Civil War period. He served as Speaker of the House of Commons for a period of almost twenty years, both before and after the execution of King Charles I.

He is best remembered for his defiance of the king on 4 January 1642 when Charles entered the chamber of the House of Commons, supported by 400 armed men, in an attempt to seize five members whom he accused of treason. When Charles asked Lenthall where the five were, Lenthall famously replied "I have neither eyes to see nor tongue to speak in this place but as this House is pleased to direct me". It was the first time in English history that a speaker of the House of Commons had declared his allegiance to the liberty of parliament rather than the will of the monarch.

== Early life ==
Lenthall was born in Henley-on-Thames, Oxfordshire, the second son of William Lenthall (died 1596) and Frances Southwell. His ancestors had migrated from Herefordshire to Oxfordshire in the 15th century. The family was recusant under Queen Elizabeth I, but this branch became Protestant after the early death of Lenthall's father in 1596. Lenthall's mother, Frances (sister of the Jesuit priest and poet Robert Southwell), conformed to the established Church.

Lenthall was educated at Lord Williams's School in Thame. He matriculated at St Alban Hall, Oxford in 1607 but left in 1609 without taking a degree. He moved to Lincoln's Inn and was called to the bar in 1616, becoming a bencher of the inn in 1633. He built up a successful legal practice, becoming recorder of Woodstock in 1621, an Oxfordshire magistrate in 1631, and recorder of Gloucester in 1638.

== Early parliamentary career and Short Parliament ==
Lenthall's parliamentary career began in 1624 when he sat as member for New Woodstock in Oxfordshire. He failed to be re-elected in 1625, but again represented the constituency during the 1640 Short Parliament, on several occasions being called upon to chair grand committees of the House on important subjects, including ship money and parliamentary grievances. The Short Parliament was dissolved on 5 May 1640 after only three weeks.

== Long Parliament ==
When Charles I recalled parliament once more on 4 November 1640, at the start of what became known as the Long Parliament, Lenthall again attended on behalf of New Woodstock. Discovering that his preferred candidate for speaker, Sir Thomas Gardiner, had failed to be returned, the king reviewed the list of available lawyers and approved Lenthall as the new speaker, a position that Lenthall was to hold for most of the next twenty years.

From the start, Lenthall had his critics. Sir Henry Mildmay criticised him for letting too many speak during a debate, he was accused of partiality and procedural errors, and at one point was made to look foolish over a point of precedence. However, the journal of Sir Simonds d'Ewes (who was not generally supportive) suggests that in the opening months of the Long Parliament Lenthall was very much in control of proceedings.

During 1640 and 1641 Lenthall proved himself a competent speaker. He introduced or codified a variety of procedural rules including the establishment of the duration of parliamentary privilege before and after sittings, the imposition of a penalty for speaking when another member had the floor, and the rule that while one piece of business was before the House a motion on another could not be made.

By late 1641 Lenthall was finding the House's long sittings physically exhausting and he became increasingly desperate to be relieved of the speakership. He was also concerned about his personal finances, pleading the prospect of financial ruin if he were to continue. In the event, however, he was to remain in post, with only a few gaps, for many more years.

=== The king's attempted seizure of the Five Members ===
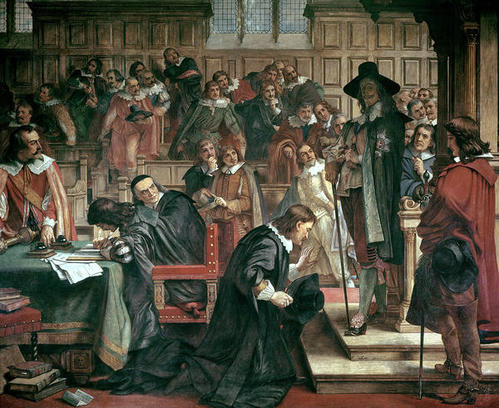
Lenthall kneels to Charles during the attempted arrest of the Five Members

The relationship between the House of Commons and the king became increasingly fraught during 1641, and at the end of the year Charles launched in the House of Lords accusations of treason against five leading members of the Commons. The Commons sat to consider the allegations on 3 January 1642, and held them to be a breach of the House's privilege. Provoked, and determined that the Five Members should not escape arrest, Charles decided to go to the House of Commons himself to apprehend them. The next day, 4 January, he arrived in person, accompanied by about 400 armed men, and entered the Commons chamber. Addressing Lenthall, he said "Mr Speaker, I must for a time make bold with your chair". Lenthall vacated it. Calling first for one of the members, and then another, Charles was met with total silence. He asked the speaker where they were. Kneeling, Lenthall responded:

May it please your majesty, I have neither eyes to see nor tongue to speak in this place but as this House is pleased to direct me whose servant I am here; and I humbly beg your majesty's pardon that I cannot give any other answer than this to what your majesty is pleased to demand of me.

It was the first time that a speaker had declared his allegiance to the liberty of parliament rather than the will of the monarch.

The King paused. "'Tis no matter, I think my eyes are as good as another's". He studied the benches for 'a pretty while' then lamented "all my birds have flown". He left the chair and walked out 'in a more discontented and angry passion than he came in', followed by shouts of "Privilege! Privilege!" from the members.

Charles's intended show of strength having failed, he left London less than a week later, and within months the country was plunged into civil war.

Lenthall's defence of his office was acknowledged by the House on 9 April, when it awarded him the sum of £6000. In the last speech that Lenthall delivered to the king he talked of reconciliation, and invited Charles to rid himself of false counsellors.

=== Civil War ===
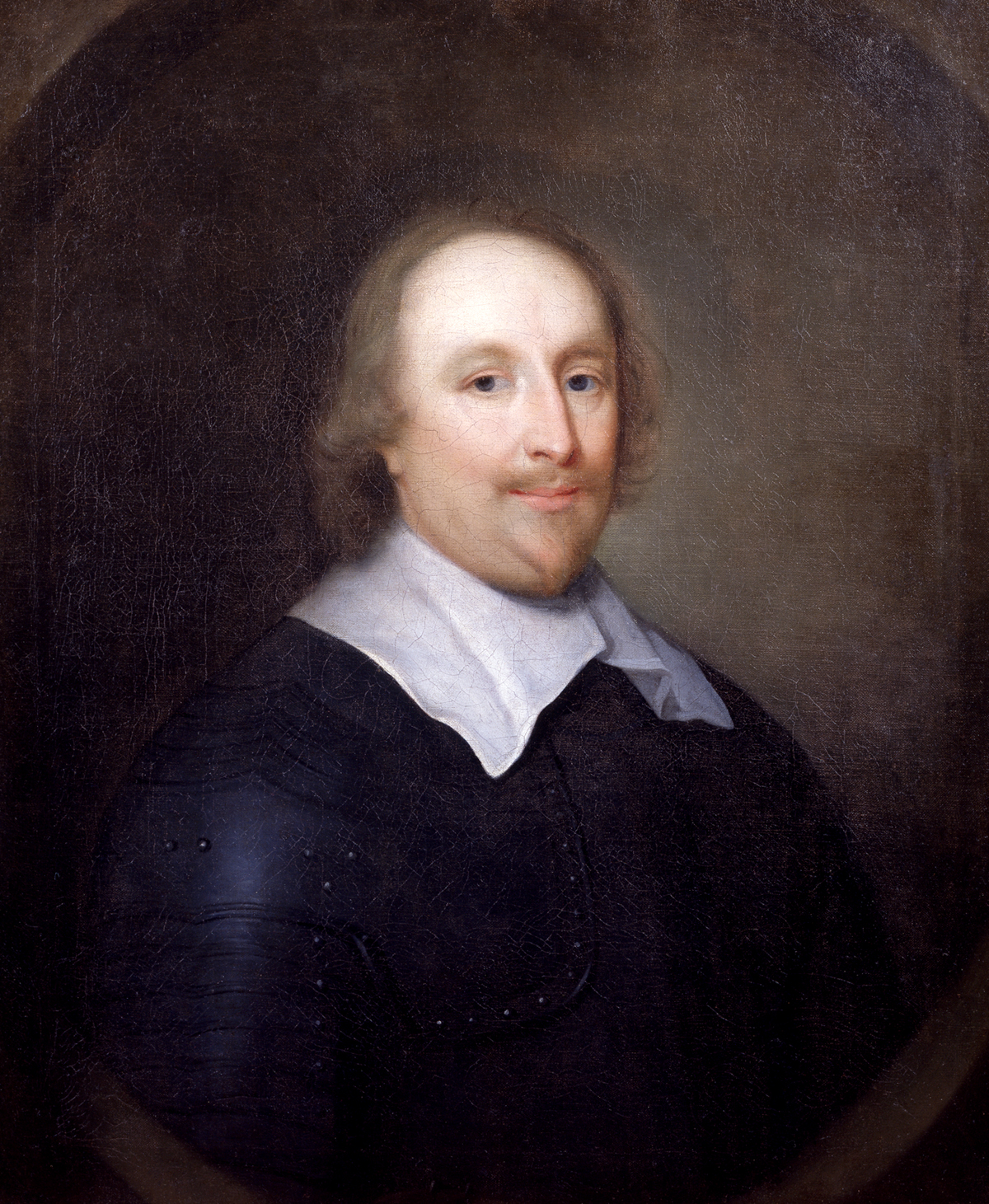
Portrait of William Lenthall by Cornelis Janssens van Ceulen

Parliament continued to sit during the civil war, acting now without the king's authority. Lenthall remained in the chair, supporting the Parliamentary cause but without much sympathy toward those diehard Protestants who were seeking radical ecclesiastical reform. In November 1642, he argued forcefully that the Commons should send peace proposals to the king.

Lenthall's appointment to a series of high offices during this period brought some relief to his preoccupation with his personal finances. He had already called attention to the inadequacy of his salary and been granted a sum of £6,000, and during the 1640s he became Master of the Rolls, a commissioner of the Great Seal, and Chancellor of the Duchy of Lancaster. Nevertheless, his worries continued especially since with the coming of war his estates near Oxford were at risk of confiscation by the royalists. In June 1649 a labourer broke into his London house and stole £1900; he was later caught, tried, and sentenced to hang.

By 1647 popular dissent was growing against the power of the New Model Army and the oppressions of local committees. The Long Parliament found itself increasingly unpopular, having imposed punitive taxation and chosen a course which had led to slaughter without any identifiable achievement. On 26 July a mob invaded parliament to force it to agree to the army's Solemn Engagement (its refusal to disband until its grievances were met). The speaker was held in the chair by force and was compelled to put to the vote a resolution inviting the king to London.

On 31 July 1647 Lenthall published a personal declaration stating that votes in the Commons had been forced, rendering them void. He declared that he would take himself to the army, and would return only when free to resume his office. Along with fifty-seven other members, eight peers and the speaker of the Lords, he left London. The fugitive members were well received by the soldiers, and they were invited by their commander Lord Fairfax to review 15,000 men on Hounslow Heath on 3 August. Fairfax's regiments encircled London the next day, and under his protection Lenthall and the other fugitives were escorted in triumph back to parliament. Lenthall was re-installed in the chair, and all votes passed during his absence were subsequently annulled.

Lenthall sympathized with the Independents in parliament, and was portrayed by royalist newspapers in 1648 as being their tool, plotting to manipulate the House in their interests. But he did not always act as expected, for example using his casting vote in favour of continuing negotiations with the king.

=== Pride's Purge ===
On 6 December 1648, in an event known as Pride's Purge, troops of the New Model Army under the command of Colonel Thomas Pride forcibly removed from parliament all those who were not Independents or Army supporters. Lenthall remained silent, and had probably been warned in advance. He was certainly consulted on several occasions by Independent leaders during the December crisis.

=== Rump Parliament ===
The Purge had reduced the Commons to a rump of a little over 200 hard-line members. Lenthall remained in post during the debates and resolutions that led ultimately to Charles's execution on 30 January 1649, though there is no evidence that he was otherwise active in the events leading up to the regicide. Later he claimed to have sent money to the king at Oxford, and to have helped with the care of the queen and the royal children. He also used his influence, when he thought it safe to do so, to help some royalists, using his casting vote at times to save the lives of some.

In February 1649, the House voted to abolish both the House of Peers and the monarchy, and Lenthall became speaker of a new supreme unicameral parliament. Though holding comparatively little power, Lenthall as its representative became the leading citizen of England. Although the first to take the engagement of loyalty to the new Commonwealth, he remained conservative in his approach to public affairs.

In December 1651 Oliver Cromwell arranged a meeting at the speaker's house to discuss options for future government. Lenthall, along with the other lawyers present, argued against the idea of a pure republic and in favour of a mixed constitution incorporating some role for a monarch.

=== Cromwell's dismissal of the Rump ===
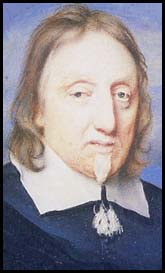
Lenthall in about 1652

The Rump Parliament had undertaken to dissolve itself "as soon as may possibly stand with the safety of the people", but it failed to do so, and on 20 April 1653 it was forcibly dissolved by Cromwell and other leading army officers. Supported by Colonel Thomas Harrison and 30 or 40 musketeers, Cromwell ordered the chamber to be cleared. Lenthall once again rose to the occasion, announcing to Harrison that he would not come down unless he was pulled out. Harrison stretched out an arm and Lenthall submitted, doubtless realising the futility of resistance.

Lenthall had become associated with the shortcomings of the Rump, and he found no place in the Nominated Assembly that sat between July and December 1653.

=== First Protectorate Parliament ===
The First Protectorate Parliament was summoned in 1654 by Cromwell, in his new role as Lord Protector. Lenthall was returned as member for Oxfordshire, and on 4 September was once again confirmed as speaker.

=== Second Protectorate Parliament ===
In the Second Protectorate Parliament, summoned by Cromwell on 17 September 1656, Lenthall was again returned as member for Oxfordshire, but this time was not selected as speaker. He nevertheless took a full part in the proceedings, being the senior member on the committee charged with settling the new constitutional arrangements. He was supportive of the Protector and was rewarded—after some agitation on his part—with a seat in Cromwell's new Other House, taking up his place as Lord Lenthall 10 December 1657.

=== Revival of the Rump Parliament ===
After the death of Oliver Cromwell on 3 September 1658 his son Richard Cromwell succeeded him as Lord Protector. The Protectorate rapidly collapsed, and on 6 May 1659 Lenthall was visited by senior army officers who asked him to help with the revival of the Rump Parliament, and to return as speaker. Lenthall was reluctant to give up his seat in the Other House and pleaded ill health, but when he was bypassed and parliament summoned without his aid he felt himself obliged to resume his role as speaker the following day.

Lenthall now presided over a revived parliament of only 78 members, and in spite of his parallel role as head of the army, division between parliament and the army deepened. On 12 October 1659 the army surrounded and occupied the precincts of the House, and for a night and a day a stand-off with the parliamentary defenders ensued. Lenthall himself was denied access by the blockading soldiers, and had to turn back. To his remonstrance that he was their general, the soldiers replied that they would have known him as such had he marched before them on Winnington Bridge.

But the army leaders themselves were unclear whether their latest coup was intended to bring down the restored Rump or merely to bring it to terms. Lenthall began to manoeuvre away from the republicans, and in November was reported to have been in touch with General George Monck who was actively working against factions within the army that opposed the Rump. The situation had completely changed by 24 December when Lenthall was approached at home and his permission sought, as head of the army, for troops to parade in Lincoln's Inn Fields. Soldiers who had earlier refused to recognise Lenthall's authority now marched to his house to acclaim him with shouts and a volley of shots.

He arranged a sitting of the restored Rump on 26 December 1659 with only 42 members present, but then absented himself from the House for ten days pleading gout (probably to avoid taking the oath abjuring the House of Stuart, sought by the republicans in Parliament). By February 1660, Lenthall was fully co-operating with Monck and had broken completely with the republicans.

On 16 March 1660 The Rump Parliament voted to dissolve itself, bringing Lenthall's long period of speakerships to a close and clearing the way for Monck to organise fresh elections for the Convention Parliament. Lenthall was active in bringing about the Restoration, with his advice and service, but found himself out of favour. Monck lobbied to have Lenthall elected for Oxford University, but without success.

== The Restoration ==
The new parliament met for the first time on 25 April 1660 and on 8 May proclaimed that King Charles II had retrospectively been the lawful monarch since the execution of Charles I on 30 January 1649. Lenthall sent £3,000 to the new king, seeking to retain the Mastership of the Rolls, but was told it had been allocated elsewhere.

Lenthall was at risk of being put on trial by the new regime for some of his acts during the interregnum, and he was strongly denounced by William Prynne. Ultimately, however, he was merely barred by the Act of Indemnity and Oblivion 1660 from further public office for life. The act mentioned him by name as being exempt from its indemnity provisions if he ever again were to accept public office.

On 12 October 1660 he gave evidence at the trial of the regicide Thomas Scot, swearing that Scot had spoken in parliament in favour of executing the king; an act that disgusted many in the light of his famous defence of parliamentary privilege in 1642.

== Death ==
Lenthall retired to Burford, Oxfordshire, where he died on 3 September 1662; he was buried at the church there. On his deathbed he made a confession: "I confess with Saul, I held their clothes whilst they murdered him, but herein I was not so criminal as Saul was, for God, thou knowest, I never consented to his death". He requested that his only epitaph should be Vermis sum ("I am a worm"). His only surviving son was the politician John Lenthall (1624 or 1625 – 1681).

== Private life ==
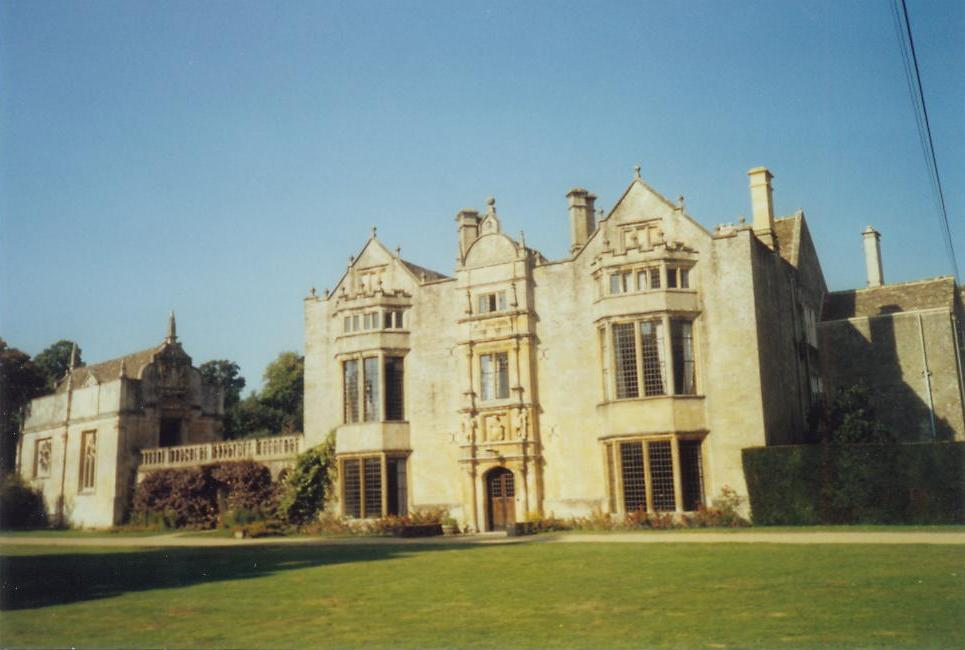
Burford Priory

By 1619 Lenthall had married Elizabeth Evans (died April 1662), daughter of Ambrose Evans of Loddington, Northamptonshire, by his wife Lettice Symonds of Cley Next the Sea, Norfolk.

William Lenthall had two chief residences, Burford Priory in Oxfordshire (still standing) and Besselsleigh Manor in Berkshire (now Oxfordshire). In 1637, he had purchased Burford from Lord Falkland. Lenthall was one of the overseers of the will of Sir Lawrence Tanfield, Lord Falkland's grandfather, and had married into Tanfield's second wife's family. The house remained in the Lenthall family until 1828.

Lenthall had an extensive collection of paintings, some being family portraits and some that may have been at Burford when he purchased it. He may also have acquired paintings from the Royal collection following the execution of Charles I. The collection was sold by the family in 1833.

== Character assessment ==
Lenthall has always been a figure who has divided opinion. In his early career, opponents frequently targeted him for perceived personal shortcomings and weaknesses as speaker. However, the Oxford Dictionary of National Biography contends that these criticisms do not stand up to scrutiny. His actions during this time demonstrate a clear commitment to upholding the authority of his office and contributing to parliamentary procedure.

On the other hand, his conservative outlook and adherence to tradition have been interpreted as evidence of a limited political vision. Allegations of self-serving corruption also surfaced repeatedly, casting a shadow over his reputation. While many of these accusations originated from those with grievances, and could be difficult to substantiate, they cannot be entirely dismissed.

Lenthall's legacy is characterised by his defiance of Charles I in January 1642.

== Bibliography ==
- Chisholm, Hugh, ed. (1911). "Lenthall, William" . Encyclopædia Britannica. Vol. 16 (11th ed.). Cambridge University Press. pp. 429–430.
- Field, John (2011). The Story of Parliament in the Palace of Westminster (2nd ed.). London: James & James. ISBN 9780907383871.
- Hibbert, Christopher (1993). Cavaliers and Roundheads: The English at War 1642–1649. HarperCollins. ISBN 0-246-13632-4.
- Roberts, Stephen K. (26 May 2005). "Lenthall, William, appointed Lord Lenthall under the protectorate". Oxford Dictionary of National Biography (online ed.). Oxford University Press. doi:10.1093/ref:odnb/16467. (Subscription, Wikipedia Library access or UK public library membership required.)
- Thrush, Andrew; Ferris, John P. (2010). The House of Commons 1604–1629. Vol. V: Members K–Q. Cambridge University Press. ISBN 978-1-107-00223-4.
- Woolrych, Austin (2002). Britain in Revolution. Oxford University Press. ISBN 0-19-927268-9.

Political offices
Preceded by John Glanville	Speaker of the House of Commons; 1640–1647	Succeeded by Henry Pelham
Preceded by Henry Pelham	Speaker of the House of Commons; 1647–1653	Succeeded by The Rev. Francis Rous
Preceded by The Rev. Francis Rous	Speaker of the House of Commons; 1654–1655	Succeeded by Sir Thomas Widdrington
Preceded by Thomas Bampfylde	Speaker of the House of Commons; 1659–1660	Succeeded by Sir Harbottle Grimston
