= Church of St John the Baptist, Burford =

Church in Oxfordshire, England

Coordinates: 51.8096°N 1.6342°W

- Church of St John the Baptist
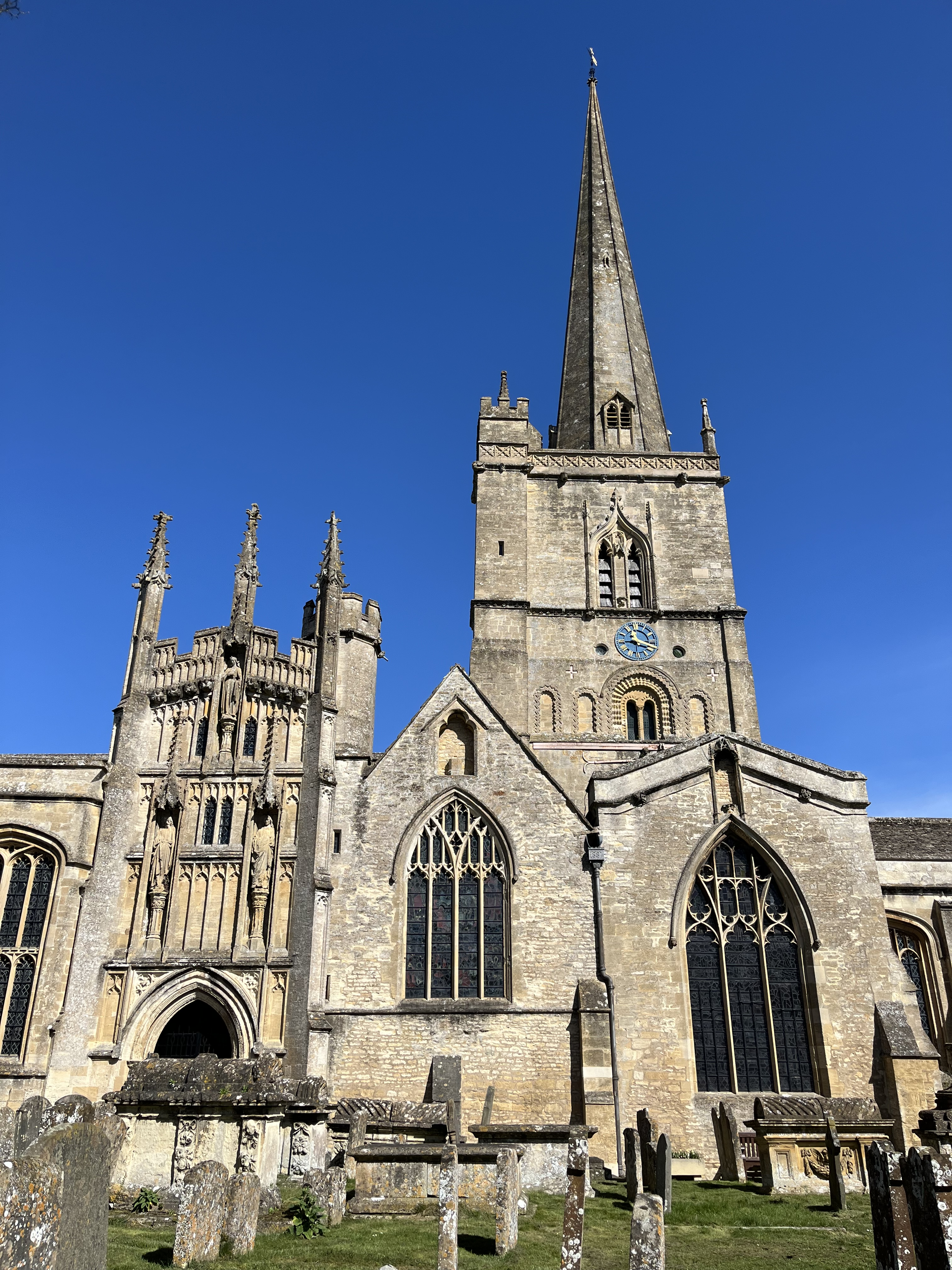

- Location within Oxfordshire
- OS grid reference: SP 25313 12402
- Country: England
- Denomination: Church of England
- Previous denomination: Roman Catholic
- Website: www.burfordchurch.org

History
- Status: Active

Architecture
- Functional status: Parish church
- Heritage designation: Grade I listed
- Designated: 12 September 1955
- Years built: 11th–15th centuries

Administration
- Diocese: Diocese of Oxford
- Benefice: Burford

Clergy
- Vicar: Tom Putt

The Anglican Church of St John the Baptist in Burford, Oxfordshire, England, is a Grade I listed building.

The Church of England parish church is dedicated to Saint John the Baptist, and is described by David Verey as "a complicated building which has developed in a curious way from the Norman". It is known for its merchants' guild chapel and memorial to Henry VIII's barber-surgeon, Edmund Harman, which features South American Indians.

== History ==
The current building was started in the 12th century. The current configuration of the building was completed by the 15th century as a Wool church.

In 1649, during the English Civil War, a group of Levellers, part of the New Model Army Banbury mutineers, were imprisoned in the church and executed by gunshot in the churchyard following the new Treason Act introduced by parliament.

It underwent extensive Victorian restoration by George Edmund Street in 1870s and was one of the instances which prompted William Morris to establish the Society for the Protection of Ancient Buildings. The restoration included the addition of a tiled floor.

The parish and benefice of Burford is within the Diocese of Oxford.

== Architecture ==
The stone building has a cruciform plan. It consists of a five-bay nave with chapels to the north and south sides. The tower and spire are above the centre of the building. The interior includes a pulpit which was restored in 1870 and a variety of tomb chests and memorials. Much of the stained glass is by Charles Eamer Kempe. Among the memorials, two are of particular note. The first is to Christoper Kempster, who died in 1715, and was a local quarry-man much favoured by Sir Christopher Wren, who employed him at St Paul's Cathedral. The second of c.1569 is to Edmund Harman and is decorated with relief carvings of South American Indians. In the Gild Chapel are tombs of the Sylvester family.
