= Thomas Wendy =

Physician to Henry VIII of England

Thomas Wendy (May 1499/1500 – 11 May 1560) was the royal physician to Henry VIII of England, a member of parliament and a member of the King's privy chamber.

Wendy attended the king on his deathbed and was one of the witnesses to his last will and testament. Wendy is credited by John Foxe as being the informer to Queen Catherine Parr of the intentions of Thomas Wriothesley and Bishop Stephen Gardiner who would try to arrest the queen for heresy. Wendy had been appointed as physician to Henry's sixth wife, Catherine Parr, before October 1546. Wendy is believed to have had Protestant sympathies.

Wendy also served as royal physician to Henry's successors, King Edward VI and Queen Mary I.

Dr. Wendy was educated at Cambridge University.

He was a member of the Parliament of England for St Albans in April 1554 and for Cambridgeshire in 1555.

Wendy died at Haslingfield, a manor granted to him by Henry VIII, on 11 May 1560.
