= Freud Communications =

British public relations firm

Freud Communications Limited
- Industry: Advertising; Public relations
- Founded: 1985
- Headquarters: London, United Kingdom,
- Key people: Matthew Freud
- Products: Branding & identity; Consumer insights; Design; Digital; Marketing; Market research; Media planning and buying; Public relations; Relationship marketing
- Number of employees: 200 approx.
- Website: freuds.com

Freud Communications Limited is a public relations firm based in London. It was founded in 1985 by Matthew Freud. He is the great-grandson of the Austrian psychoanalyst Sigmund Freud, who himself was the uncle of Edward Bernays, the Austrian-American pioneer of public relations.

== Overview ==
In 1994, Freud Communications was acquired by the independent British advertising agency Abbott Mead Vickers (AMV), for approximately £10 million. In 2001, Matthew Freud, along with several partners, repurchased the company for a similar amount. The buybac occurred in the same year that AMV as acquired by the US-based communications group Omnicom.

In June 2005, the French Publicis Groupe (then the third largest communications firm in the world) acquired a 50.1% stake in Freud Communications. In 2006, Freud purchased advertising agency DFGW.

Freud Communications also operated a United States office in New York City, until its closure in February 2009.

In 1999 Leapman reported in The Times that Freud Communications had offered an Internet brand management service to its clients. This would "scour the Net for references to its clients" and if they were criticised, "the agency would use rebuttal tactics to minimise the potentially negative impact of online inaccuracy". In 2007 PR Week ran a story documenting the use of WikiScanner to track anonymous edits and link them to organizations through their IP addresses; it found that "Freud Communications' London office was caught making Wikipedia edits on behalf of clients."

In 2011, Freud Communications had a turnover of around £40 million per year. It has a staff of more than two hundred and was ranked by PR Week in their ranking system as 6th in the UK.

== Clients ==
- Baby Cow Productions
- Formula E
- Lewis Hamilton
- Mindhorn
- Mo Farah
- Working Title
