= Upton, West Oxfordshire =

Hamlet in Oxfordshire, England

Coordinates: 51.807°N 1.657°W

Upton
- Location within Oxfordshire
- OS grid reference: SP237120
- Civil parish: Burford
- District: West Oxfordshire
- Shire county: Oxfordshire
- Region: South East
- Country: England
- Sovereign state: United Kingdom
- Post town: Burford
- Postcode district: OX18
- Dialling code: 01993
- Police: Thames Valley
- Fire: Oxfordshire
- Ambulance: South Central
- UK Parliament: Witney

Upton is a hamlet in the civil parish of Burford, in the West Oxfordshire district, in Oxfordshire, England, on the River Windrush about 1 mile (1.6 km) west of Burford. Until 1954 Upton was part of the civil parish of Upton and Signet, which was absorbed into Burford to create the civil parish of Burford and Upton and Signet. The parish had a population of 437 in the 1951 census, the last before the parish was absorbed.
