= Grade II* listed buildings in West Oxfordshire =

There are over 20,000 Grade II* listed buildings in England. This page is a list of these buildings in the district of West Oxfordshire in Oxfordshire.

== List of buildings ==
Name	Location	Type	Completed (Note: The date given is the date used by Historic England as significant for the initial building or that of an important part in the structure's description.)	Date designated	Grid ref. (Note: The grid reference is based on the British national grid reference system, sometimes known as OSGB36, used by the Ordnance Survey.) Geo-coordinates	Entry number (Note: The "List Entry Number" is a unique number assigned to each listed building and scheduled monument by Historic England.)	Image
Church of St Peter	Alvescot	Church	Early 13th century	12 September 1955	SP2738604597; 51°44′22″N 1°36′17″W	1198102	Church of St Peter More images
Church of the Holy Trinity	Ascott d'Oyley, Ascott-under-Wychwood	Church	Late 12th century	27 August 1956	SP3005818658; 51°51′57″N 1°33′54″W	1368158	Church of the Holy Trinity More images
Manor House	Ascott-under-Wychwood	Manor house	1129–50	27 August 1956	SP3021719020; 51°52′08″N 1°33′45″W	1052609	Manor House
Church of Saint Nicholas	Asthall	Church	13th century	12 September 1955	SP2871511390; 51°48′02″N 1°35′06″W	1053514	Church of Saint Nicholas More images
Cote Baptist Church	Cote, Shifford and Chimney	Church	Mid-18th century	8 October 1981	SP3511403097; 51°43′32″N 1°29′35″W	1284460	Cote Baptist Church More images
Cote House and attached forecourt walls, gatepiers and gates	Cote, Shifford and Chimney	House	Mainly early 17th century	12 September 1955	SP3552502303; 51°43′06″N 1°29′14″W	1284444	Upload Photo
Ham Court	Bampton	House	17th century	12 September 1955	SP3096903058; 51°43′31″N 1°33′11″W	1053536	Ham Court More images
The Deanery	Bampton	Clergy house	Late 11th/early 12th century	12 September 1955	SP3117603312; 51°43′40″N 1°33′00″W	1053558	The Deanery
Weald Manor	Weald	House	Late 17th century	12 September 1955	SP3109302850; 51°43′25″N 1°33′05″W	1198982	Upload Photo
East formal garden, statue of knife-grinder in north-east corner	Blenheim Park (statue now sold)	Statue	c.1700	27 July 1988	SP4421316143; 51°50′32″N 1°21′35″W	1368003	Upload Photo
East formal garden, statue of wrestlers in south-east corner	Blenheim Park (statue now sold)	Statue	c.1700	27 July 1988	SP4423216115; 51°50′31″N 1°21′34″W	1052915	Upload Photo
High Lodge and attached walls	Blenheim Park	House	c.1768	27 August 1957	SP4304815547; 51°50′13″N 1°22′36″W	1052918	Upload Photo
Temple of Diana	Blenheim Park	Temple	1772–73	27 July 1988	SP4400415834; 51°50′22″N 1°21′46″W	1281682	Temple of Diana More images
Temple of Health	Blenheim Park	Temple	1789	27 July 1988	SP4444716040; 51°50′28″N 1°21′23″W	1203467	Temple of Health More images
Church of St Britius	Brize Norton	Church	Late 12th century	12 September 1955	SP2999607596; 51°45′58″N 1°34′00″W	1368227	Church of St Britius More images
Village Cross	Broadwell	Village cross	15th century	12 September 1955	SP2524004133; 51°44′07″N 1°38′09″W	1199125	Village Cross More images
Bruern Abbey	Bruern	Abbey	c.1720	27 August 1957	SP2652020392; 51°52′53″N 1°36′58″W	1053360	Bruern Abbey More images
Red Brick Cottage	Bruern	Abbey	Early 18th century	27 August 1957	SP2664920368; 51°52′52″N 1°36′51″W	1367759	Upload Photo
Aubrey Newman (now Hamilton's Sweet Shop)	Burford, Oxfordshire	House	16th century	12 September 1955	SP2513412206; 51°48′29″N 1°38′13″W	1266772	Aubrey Newman (now Hamilton's Sweet Shop) More images
Bridge over River Windrush	River Windrush, Burford	Bridge	15th century	12 September 1955	SP2518212487; 51°48′38″N 1°38′10″W	1267151	Bridge over River Windrush More images
Bull Cottage	Burford	House	Early 14th century	12 September 1955	SP2520912158; 51°48′27″N 1°38′09″W	1225698	Upload Photo
Burford Grammar School (main part including Lenthall House)	Burford	Grammar school	Rebuilt c.1570s	12 September 1955	SP2526412371; 51°48′34″N 1°38′06″W	1267149	Burford Grammar School (main part including Lenthall House) More images
Calendars	Burford	House	Late 15th century	12 September 1955	SP2502912152; 51°48′27″N 1°38′18″W	1266408	Upload Photo
Chapel of St John, Burford Priory	Burford	Manor house	1661–62	12 September 1955	SP2499612334; 51°48′33″N 1°38′20″W	1266497	Chapel of St John, Burford Priory More images
Cob House	Burford	House	Dated 1672	12 September 1955	SP2518112420; 51°48′35″N 1°38′10″W	1224292	Cob House More images
Falkland Hall	Burford	Town house	c.1578	12 September 1955	SP2515912328; 51°48′32″N 1°38′11″W	1224323	Falkland Hall More images
96 High Street	Burford	House	16th century	12 September 1955	SP2513212197; 51°48′28″N 1°38′13″W	1224332	96 High Street
Hill House	Burford	House	16th century	12 September 1955	SP2512512027; 51°48′23″N 1°38′13″W	1224184	Hill House More images
Jackie's Tea Rooms, the Antiquary	Burford	House	15th/early 16th century	12 September 1955	SP2514612255; 51°48′30″N 1°38′12″W	1266884	Jackie's Tea Rooms, the Antiquary
Link between the Priory and Lenthall's Chapel	Burford	Loggia	1661–62	12 September 1955	SP2499912341; 51°48′33″N 1°38′20″W	1225187	Link between the Priory and Lenthall's Chapel
London House, the Crypt Antiques	Burford	House	Late 15th century	12 September 1955	SP2515312140; 51°48′26″N 1°38′12″W	1224036	London House, the Crypt Antiques More images
Methodist Church	Burford	Town house	c.1720–30	12 September 1955	SP2518012242; 51°48′30″N 1°38′10″W	1223964	Methodist Church More images
Forecourt walls, railings, gates and alleyway gateway of Methodist Church	Burford	Gate	c.1720–30	12 September 1955	SP2516912244; 51°48′30″N 1°38′11″W	1223874	Forecourt walls, railings, gates and alleyway gateway of Methodist Church
Old George Yard	Burford	Loggia	15th or 16th century	12 September 1955	SP2511412185; 51°48′28″N 1°38′14″W	1224562	Old George Yard
Oxford Knitwear, WJ Castle (butcher)	Burford	House	15th or early 16th century	12 September 1955	SP2515712124; 51°48′26″N 1°38′12″W	1224037	Oxford Knitwear, WJ Castle (butcher) More images
124 High Street, Burford	Burford	House	Remodelled 1700–20	12 September 1955	SP2511512159; 51°48′27″N 1°38′14″W	1224598	124 High Street, Burford More images
Red Lion House	Burford	House	17th century	12 September 1955	SP2511512165; 51°48′27″N 1°38′14″W	1266762	Red Lion House
Riverside House	Burford	Town house	Late 18th century	12 September 1955	SP2521612445; 51°48′36″N 1°38′08″W	1223724	Riverside House More images
Robert Aston tomb, about 10 metres south of south-west corner of Church of St John	Burford	Table tomb	1698	1 March 1990	SP2528212389; 51°48′34″N 1°38′05″W	1284083	Robert Aston tomb, about 10 metres south of south-west corner of Church of St John
Symon Wysdom's House	Burford	House	Remodelled 1576	12 September 1955	SP2521012470; 51°48′37″N 1°38′09″W	1223797	Symon Wysdom's House More images
The Bull Hotel	Burford	Coaching inn	Largely rebuilt c.1620	12 September 1955	SP2518612150; 51°48′27″N 1°38′10″W	1223880	The Bull Hotel More images
The former George Inn	Burford	Jettied house	15th or 16th century	12 September 1955	SP2513012174; 51°48′28″N 1°38′13″W	1224560	The former George Inn More images
The Great Almshouses	Burford	Almshouse	Mid-15th century	12 September 1955	SP2529212345; 51°48′33″N 1°38′04″W	1053285	The Great Almshouses More images
The Great House	Burford	Town house	1685	12 September 1955	SP2527512139; 51°48′26″N 1°38′05″W	1266237	The Great House More images
The Highway Hotel	Burford	House	18th century	12 September 1955	SP2514712106; 51°48′25″N 1°38′12″W	1224038	The Highway Hotel More images
The House of Simon	Burford	Jettied house	16th century	12 September 1955	SP2515012087; 51°48′25″N 1°38′12″W	1224146	The House of Simon More images
The Old Rectory	Burford	Vicarage	c.1680–1700	12 September 1955	SP2507912369; 51°48′34″N 1°38′16″W	1224757	The Old Rectory
The Tolsey	Burford	Market house	16th century	12 September 1955	SP2512212134; 51°48′26″N 1°38′13″W	1224632	The Tolsey More images
Wysdomes	Burford	Timber-framed house	Early 18th century	12 September 1955	SP2515112093; 51°48′25″N 1°38′12″W	1267018	Wysdomes More images
115 High Street (Early Oak)	Burford	Continuous Jetty House	16th century	12 September 1955	SP2516212111; 51°48′25″N 1°38′11″W	1224106	115 High Street (Early Oak) More images
Church of St Nicholas	Chadlington	Church	Late 12th century	30 August 1988	SP3336722032; 51°53′45″N 1°30′59″W	1368037	Church of St Nicholas More images
Lower Court Farmhouse	Greenend, Chadlington	Farmhouse	c.1700	30 August 1988	SP3236721158; 51°53′17″N 1°31′52″W	1368038	Upload Photo
Manor House and attached walls and outbuildings	Chadlington	Manor house	Early/mid-17th century	27 August 1957	SP3334521961; 51°53′43″N 1°31′01″W	1052835	Manor House and attached walls and outbuildings More images
Lee Place	Charlbury	Country house	c.1640	27 August 1956	SP3582419104; 51°52′10″N 1°28′52″W	1284015	Upload Photo
Church of St Mary	Chastleton	Church	Late 12th century	27 August 1957	SP2486829068; 51°57′34″N 1°38′22″W	1183347	Church of St Mary More images
Dovecote about 130m south-east of Chastleton House	Chastleton	Dovecote	1762	27 August 1957	SP2492628989; 51°57′32″N 1°38′19″W	1284029	Dovecote about 130m south-east of Chastleton House More images
Gateway, attached garden walls and coachhouse to south of main front of Chastleton House	Chastleton	Gate	Early 17th century	15 May 1989	SP2485429034; 51°57′33″N 1°38′23″W	1367763	Gateway, attached garden walls and coachhouse to south of main front of Chastleton House More images
Stables and brewhouse about 12m south-west of Chastleton House	Chastleton	Brewhouse	Early 17th century	27 August 1957	SP2480829039; 51°57′33″N 1°38′25″W	1053368	Stables and brewhouse about 12m south-west of Chastleton House More images
Church of All Saints	Shorthampton, Chilson	Church	12th century	27 August 1957	SP3282220102; 51°52′43″N 1°31′29″W	1053112	Church of All Saints More images
Barclays Bank	Chipping Norton	Town house	c.1780	20 June 1986	SP3140327117; 51°56′30″N 1°32′40″W	1368162	Upload Photo
Bliss Tweed Mill	Chipping Norton	Tweed mill	1872	3 July 1980	SP3043426696; 51°56′17″N 1°33′31″W	1198094	Bliss Tweed Mill More images
Co-operative Chemist	Chipping Norton	House	c.1730	23 April 1952	SP3136927070; 51°56′29″N 1°32′42″W	1052656	Upload Photo
Kings Head Court	Chipping Norton	Apartment	Refronted c.1720	23 April 1952	SP3118327085; 51°56′29″N 1°32′52″W	1368152	Upload Photo
National Westminster Bank	Chipping Norton	Town house	c.1780	23 April 1952	SP3131327121; 51°56′30″N 1°32′45″W	1183153	National Westminster Bank
The Playpen	Chipping Norton	House	Late 14th century	23 April 1952	SP3142627162; 51°56′31″N 1°32′39″W	1052618	The Playpen
Town Hall	Chipping Norton	Town hall	1842	23 April 1952	SP3133327054; 51°56′28″N 1°32′44″W	1183188	Town Hall More images
Former White Hart Hotel	Chipping Norton	Office	1725	23 April 1952	SP3138827138; 51°56′31″N 1°32′41″W	1052616	Former White Hart Hotel More images
15 Market Place	Chipping Norton	House	17th century	23 April 1952	SP3131027113; 51°56′30″N 1°32′45″W	1052623	Upload Photo
1–4 Church Street	Chipping Norton	Almshouse	1640	23 April 1952	SP3133427279; 51°56′35″N 1°32′44″W	1182730	1–4 Church Street More images
Church of All Saints	Churchill	Church	1826	27 August 1957	SP2832524104; 51°54′53″N 1°35′23″W	1053342	Church of All Saints More images
Church of St Stephen	Clanfield	Church	Early 14th century	12 September 1955	SP2834502153; 51°43′03″N 1°35′28″W	1053402	Church of St Stephen More images
Combe Mill	Combe	Saw mill	By 1852	29 June 1988	SP4166015041; 51°49′57″N 1°23′49″W	1053004	Combe Mill More images
Stable block about 40m north-east of Cornbury House	Cornbury and Wychwood	Stable	1663	27 August 1957	SP3507518209; 51°51′41″N 1°29′31″W	1183387	Upload Photo
Church of St Peter	Cornwell	Church	12th century	27 August 1954	SP2736627156; 51°56′32″N 1°36′12″W	1283726	Church of St Peter More images
Cornwell Manor	Cornwell	House	16/17th century	27 August 1954	SP2718227170; 51°56′33″N 1°36′22″W	1198747	Cornwell Manor More images
Caswell House, Caswell Farmhouse and attached outbuilding	Caswell, Curbridge	House	Late 15th century	12 September 1955	SP3205808234; 51°46′19″N 1°32′12″W	1048993	Upload Photo
Church of St John the Baptist	Curbridge	Church	1906	17 October 1988	SP3318208811; 51°46′37″N 1°31′14″W	1368232	Church of St John the Baptist More images
Church of St Kenelm	Enstone	Church	Late 12th century	30 August 1988	SP3797025119; 51°55′24″N 1°26′57″W	1052805	Church of St Kenelm More images
Rectorial Tithe Barn	Enstone	Abbey	1382	27 August 1957	SP3785325106; 51°55′23″N 1°27′04″W	1368063	Rectorial Tithe Barn
Wayside Cross	Gagingwell	Wayside cross	Late medieval	30 August 1988	SP4079225115; 51°55′23″N 1°24′30″W	1052803	Wayside Cross More images
Church of St Leonard	Eynsham	Church	Late 13th century	12 September 1955	SP4330509226; 51°46′48″N 1°22′25″W	1048964	Church of St Leonard More images
Church of St John the Baptist	Fifield	Church	Early 13th century	27 August 1957	SP2394818753; 51°52′01″N 1°39′13″W	1283580	Church of St John the Baptist More images
Fifield House	Fifield	Farmhouse	Late 17th or early 18th century	15 May 1989	SP2414718765; 51°52′01″N 1°39′03″W	1198985	Upload Photo
Church of St Peter	Broughton Poggs, Filkins and Broughton Poggs	Church	12th century	12 September 1955	SP2354603821; 51°43′57″N 1°39′38″W	1199479	Church of St Peter More images
Finstock Manor House	Finstock	Manor house	1660	27 August 1957	SP3613016716; 51°50′52″N 1°28′37″W	1367894	Finstock Manor House More images
Church of St Mary	Freeland	Church	1869	1 September 1973	SP4139212714; 51°48′42″N 1°24′04″W	1367941	Church of St Mary More images
Church of Saint James the Great	Fulbrook	Church	12th century	12 September 1955	SP2583713034; 51°48′55″N 1°37′36″W	1199969	Church of Saint James the Great More images
Medieval chest tomb about 5m south of tower of Church of St James the Great	Fulbrook	Chest tomb	15th century	21 August 1989	SP2583013025; 51°48′55″N 1°37′36″W	1053491	Upload Photo
Gatepiers and gates about 80m south-east of Great Tew House	Great Tew Park, Great Tew	Gate	c.1700	27 August 1956	SP3979629004; 51°57′29″N 1°25′20″W	1286304	Gatepiers and gates about 80m south-east of Great Tew House
57 and 58 The Lane	Great Tew	House	17th century	27 August 1956	SP3947329367; 51°57′41″N 1°25′37″W	1286152	57 and 58 The Lane
The Old Manor House	Hailey	House	Late 15th or early 16th century	12 September 1955	SP3585312490; 51°48′36″N 1°28′53″W	1198776	The Old Manor House
Church of St Mary	Cokethorpe, Hardwick-with-Yelford	Church	Late 15th century	12 September 1955	SP3735606244; 51°45′13″N 1°27′37″W	1368277	Church of St Mary More images
Church of St Nicholas and St Swithin	Yelford, Hardwick-with-Yelford	Church	c.1500	12 September 1955	SP3587604709; 51°44′24″N 1°28′55″W	1198970	Church of St Nicholas and St Swithin More images
Cokethorpe School	Cokethorpe, Hardwick-with-Yelford	Country house	1709	12 September 1955	SP3710606170; 51°45′11″N 1°27′50″W	1048970	Cokethorpe School More images
Yelford Manor	Yelford, Hardwick-with-Yelford	House	Late 15th century	12 September 1955	SP3596304746; 51°44′25″N 1°28′50″W	1368241	Upload Photo
Bath House, reservoir and conduit SSW of Heythrop House	Heythrop Park, Heythrop	Bath house	c.1710	16 September 1999	SP3627826086; 51°55′56″N 1°28′26″W	1112993	Bath House, reservoir and conduit SSW of Heythrop House
Heythrop House	Heythrop Park, Heythrop	Country house	c.1705	27 August 1957	SP3639126437; 51°56′07″N 1°28′20″W	1052781	Heythrop House More images
Old Church of St Nicholas	Heythrop	Church	12th century	27 August 1957	SP3522327713; 51°56′48″N 1°29′20″W	1052776	Old Church of St Nicholas More images
Screen with alcove and niches SSW of Heythrop House	Heythrop Park, Heythrop	Garden Screen	c.1710	16 September 1999	SP3622026148; 51°55′58″N 1°28′29″W	1112992	Screen with alcove and niches SSW of Heythrop House
Bradshaw's Farmhouse with attached garden wall	Kelmscott	Farmhouse	1757	12 September 1955	SU2456999325; 51°41′32″N 1°38′45″W	1199066	Upload Photo
Church of St George	Kelmscott	Church	Late 12th century	12 September 1955	SU2491999368; 51°41′33″N 1°38′27″W	1199126	Church of St George More images
Manor Cottages	Kelmscott	Farm labourer's cottage	1914	30 March 1989	SU2501698998; 51°41′21″N 1°38′22″W	1199315	Manor Cottages More images
Memorial Cottages with attached outbuildings and garden walls	Kelmscott	House	1902	12 September 1955	SU2498799017; 51°41′22″N 1°38′24″W	1367768	Memorial Cottages with attached outbuildings and garden walls More images
Church of St George	Kencot	Church	12th century	12 September 1955	SP2543904734; 51°44′27″N 1°37′59″W	1053501	Church of St George More images
Church of St Nicholas	Kiddington	Church	12th century	27 August 1957	SP4114322912; 51°54′12″N 1°24′12″W	1198490	Church of St Nicholas More images
Wayside cross at SP4107022310	Over Kiddington, Kiddington with Asterleigh	Wayside cross	15th century	27 August 1957	SP4107022310; 51°53′52″N 1°24′16″W	1198629	Wayside cross at SP4107022310 More images
Church of St Andrew	Kingham, Oxfordshire	Church	Mid-14th century	27 August 1957	SP2582623725; 51°54′41″N 1°37′33″W	1283232	Church of St Andrew More images
Kingham House	Kingham	House	c.1688	27 August 1957	SP2583523762; 51°54′42″N 1°37′33″W	1367805	Kingham House More images
Churchyard cross about 50m east of Church of St Matthew	Langford	Cross	15th century	12 September 1955	SP2497302541; 51°43′16″N 1°38′24″W	1199490	Upload Photo
Church of St Michael and All Angels	Leafield	Church	c.1858	21 August 1989	SP3186015336; 51°50′09″N 1°32′20″W	1367730	Church of St Michael and All Angels More images
Langley Farmhouse	Leafield	Farmhouse	c.1478	19 December 1986	SP2952715510; 51°50′15″N 1°34′22″W	1182682	Upload Photo
St Margaret's Church	Little Faringdon	Church	12th century	12 September 1955	SP2262701407; 51°42′39″N 1°40′26″W	1283247	St Margaret's Church More images
Barn about 55m ESE of Manor Farmhouse	Minster Lovell	Barn	Probably 15th century	12 September 1955	SP3247811392; 51°48′01″N 1°31′50″W	1367717	Barn about 55m ESE of Manor Farmhouse More images
Manor Farmhouse	Minster Lovell	Farmhouse	12th century	12 September 1955	SP3239911409; 51°48′01″N 1°31′54″W	1053432	Manor Farmhouse
Minster Lovell Manor Dovecot	Minster Lovell	Dovecote	15th century	12 September 1955	SP3246311446; 51°48′03″N 1°31′50″W	1367756	Minster Lovell Manor Dovecot More images
19 and 21 Upper Crescent	Charterville, Minster Lovell	Chartist colony school	c.1847	7 July 1977	SP3120810883; 51°47′45″N 1°32′56″W	1053438	19 and 21 Upper Crescent
Church of St Peter	Wilcote, North Leigh	Church	Late 12th century	12 September 1955	SP3710415288; 51°50′06″N 1°27′47″W	1367959	Church of St Peter More images
Rectory Farm, barn about 60m NNE of farmhouse	Northmoor	Barn	18th century	17 October 1988	SP4215802892; 51°43′23″N 1°23′28″W	1048940	Upload Photo
Rectory Farmhouse	Northmoor	Farmhouse	1629	12 September 1955	SP4214802825; 51°43′21″N 1°23′28″W	1048939	Rectory Farmhouse More images
Wychwood Lodge	Ramsden	Farmhouse	Late 16th century	12 September 1955	SP3534115388; 51°50′10″N 1°29′19″W	1283705	Upload Photo
Church of St Philip	Little Rollright, Rollright	Church	Early 13th century	27 August 1957	SP2935330125; 51°58′08″N 1°34′27″W	1251364	Church of St Philip More images
Church of St James	Rousham	Church	Late 12th century	27 August 1957	SP4799324169; 51°54′50″N 1°18′13″W	1199466	Church of St James More images
Boat House	Rousham Park Gardens, Rousham	Boathouse	1733–40	27 August 1957	SP4802824262; 51°54′53″N 1°18′11″W	1052958	Upload Photo
Cowhouse about 410m south of Rousham Park	Rousham Park, Rousham	Ferme ornée	1733–40	27 August 1957	SP4786823802; 51°54′39″N 1°18′20″W	1199269	Cowhouse about 410m south of Rousham Park
Dovecote about 74m east-south-east of Rousham House	Rousham Park Gardens, Rousham	Dovecote	17th century	27 August 1957	SP4794024189; 51°54′51″N 1°18′16″W	1052959	Dovecote about 74m east-south-east of Rousham House More images
Garden seat next to River Cherwell, and garden walls, doorways and gateway to east of Rousham Park	Rousham Park Gardens, Rousham	Gate	17th century	27 August 1957	SP4801824236; 51°54′53″N 1°18′12″W	1199448	Upload Photo
Grotto about 4m west of the Cold Bath	Rousham Park Gardens, Rousham	Grotto	1738–40	27 August 1957	SP4777624542; 51°55′03″N 1°18′24″W	1199415	Upload Photo
Herm about 86m NNE of Rousham Park and at north-east corner of bowling green	Rousham Park Gardens, Rousham	Herm	1733–40	27 August 1957	SP4787524311; 51°54′55″N 1°18′19″W	1283442	Upload Photo
Herm about 86m north of Rousham Park and at north-west corner of bowling green	Rousham Park Gardens, Rousham	Herm	1733–40	27 August 1957	SP4783224323; 51°54′55″N 1°18′22″W	1283417	Upload Photo
Heyford Bridge (that part in Rousham civil parish)	Rousham	Bridge	1255	27 August 1957	SP4780224778; 51°55′10″N 1°18′23″W	1367979	Heyford Bridge (that part in Rousham civil parish) More images
Lodge about 10m SSE of Palladian gateway	Rousham Park Gardens, Rousham	Cow house	1733–40	27 August 1957	SP4762824371; 51°54′57″N 1°18′32″W	1283415	Upload Photo
Lower Cascade in Venus' Vale	Rousham Park Gardens, Rousham	Cascade	1738–40	27 August 1957	SP4777024477; 51°55′00″N 1°18′25″W	1367986	Lower Cascade in Venus' Vale
Palladian Gateway	Rousham Park Gardens, Rousham	Gate	1733–40	27 August 1957	SP4762324383; 51°54′57″N 1°18′32″W	1052953	Palladian Gateway More images
Praeneste	Rousham Park Gardens, Rousham	Garden building	1738–40	27 August 1957	SP4776924425; 51°54′59″N 1°18′25″W	1367983	Praeneste More images
Retaining walls to the Cold Bath, Octagon Pool and Watery Walk	Rousham Park Gardens, Rousham	Pond	1738–40	27 August 1957	SP4776424500; 51°55′01″N 1°18′25″W	1052955	Retaining walls to the Cold Bath, Octagon Pool and Watery Walk
Stables and attached walls attached to, and south-east of, Rousham House	Rousham Park, Rousham	Stable	c.1738	27 August 1957	SP4787524178; 51°54′51″N 1°18′19″W	1199244	Upload Photo
Statue of Apollo at end of Long Walk and about 12m south-east of the Temple of Echo	Rousham Park Gardens, Rousham	Statue	c.1739	27 August 1957	SP4781124595; 51°55′04″N 1°18′23″W	1199424	Statue of Apollo at end of Long Walk and about 12m south-east of the Temple of Echo More images
Statue of Bacchus in Bridgeman's Amphitheatre	Rousham Park Gardens, Rousham	Statue	Early 18th century	27 August 1957	SP4780624406; 51°54′58″N 1°18′23″W	1283359	Statue of Bacchus in Bridgeman's Amphitheatre
Statue of Ceres in Bridgeman's Amphitheatre	Rousham Park Gardens, Rousham	Statue	Early 18th century	27 August 1957	SP4782224398; 51°54′58″N 1°18′22″W	1283365	Upload Photo
Statue of Dying Gaul about 5m south-west of balustrade of Praeneste	Rousham Park Gardens, Rousham	Statue	c.1743	27 August 1957	SP4776224421; 51°54′59″N 1°18′25″W	1283423	Statue of Dying Gaul about 5m south-west of balustrade of Praeneste
Statue of Faun in Venus Vale, to ENE of Upper Cascade	Rousham Park Gardens, Rousham	Statue	1701	27 August 1957	SP4771524478; 51°55′00″N 1°18′28″W	1367985	Upload Photo
Statue of Lion and Horse about 85m north of Rousham Park and at north end of bowling green	Rousham Park Gardens, Rousham	Statue	1743	27 August 1957	SP4785124318; 51°54′55″N 1°18′21″W	1052950	Statue of Lion and Horse about 85m north of Rousham Park and at north end of bowling green More images
Statue of Mercury in Bridgeman's Amphitheatre	Rousham Park Gardens, Rousham	Statue	Early 18th century	27 August 1957	SP4781124396; 51°54′58″N 1°18′23″W	1052957	Upload Photo
Statue of Pan in Venus Vale, to ESE of Upper Cascade	Rousham Park Gardens, Rousham	Statue	1701	27 August 1957	SP4772624447; 51°54′59″N 1°18′27″W	1052954	Upload Photo
Temple of Echo	Rousham Park Gardens, Rousham	Garden temple	1738–40	27 August 1957	SP4778224598; 51°55′04″N 1°18′24″W	1052956	Temple of Echo
The Pyramid House	Rousham Park Gardens, Rousham	Gazebo	1733–40	27 August 1957	SP4793624274; 51°54′54″N 1°18′16″W	1367987	Upload Photo
Upper Cascade including statues of Venus and swans in Venus Vale	Rousham Park Gardens, Rousham	Statue	1738–40	27 August 1957	SP4771324459; 51°55′00″N 1°18′28″W	1283383	Upper Cascade including statues of Venus and swans in Venus Vale
Urn about 10m ENE of Palladian Gateway	Rousham Park Gardens, Rousham	Urn	1733–40	27 August 1957	SP4762924385; 51°54′57″N 1°18′32″W	1199384	Upload Photo
Urn about 10m ESE of Palladian Gateway	Rousham Park Gardens, Rousham	Urn	1733–40	27 August 1957	SP4762724381; 51°54′57″N 1°18′32″W	1367984	Upload Photo
Urn about 3m from north-east corner of Praeneste	Rousham Park Gardens, Rousham	Urn	c.1738	27 August 1957	SP4776724440; 51°54′59″N 1°18′25″W	1052952	Urn about 3m from north-east corner of Praeneste
Urn about 3m from south-east corner of Praeneste	Rousham Park Gardens, Rousham	Urn	c.1738	27 August 1957	SP4778224417; 51°54′58″N 1°18′24″W	1283406	Urn about 3m from south-east corner of Praeneste
Church of St Martin	Sandford St. Martin	Church	13th century	27 August 1956	SP4202826691; 51°56′14″N 1°23′24″W	1052510	Church of St Martin More images
Sandford Park	Sandford Park, Sandford St. Martin	Country house	c.1700	27 August 1956	SP4196526717; 51°56′15″N 1°23′28″W	1286006	Upload Photo
Summerhouse about 200m north-west of Sandford Park	Sandford Park, Sandford St. Martin	Summerhouse	Late 18th century	18 May 1987	SP4180826814; 51°56′18″N 1°23′36″W	1368187	Upload Photo
Former stables immediately to south-east of Sarsden House	Sarsden	House	Probably early to mid-17th century	27 August 1957	SP2897122971; 51°54′16″N 1°34′49″W	1053277	Upload Photo
Sarsden House	Sarsden	Country house	Rebuilt after 1689	27 August 1957	SP2891423006; 51°54′17″N 1°34′52″W	1367832	Upload Photo
The Dower House	Sarsden	House	c.1825	1 May 1985	SP3055924376; 51°55′01″N 1°33′26″W	1200341	Upload Photo
Wayside cross at NGR SP29082329	Sarsden	Wayside Cross	Early to mid-14th century	27 August 1957	SP2908723282; 51°54′26″N 1°34′43″W	1053279	Wayside cross at NGR SP29082329 More images
Church of the Holy Rood	Shilton	Church	12th century	12 September 1955	SP2671608299; 51°46′22″N 1°36′51″W	1357113	Church of the Holy Rood More images
Dovecote about 45m north-west of the Old Manor	Shilton	Dovecote	Early 16th century	12 September 1955	SP2682908491; 51°46′28″N 1°36′45″W	1225800	Upload Photo
Manor House	Shilton	Manor house	1678	12 September 1955	SP2654308441; 51°46′26″N 1°37′00″W	1266168	Upload Photo
Morgan bale tomb about 3m east of Church of St Mary	Shipton-under-Wychwood	Table tomb	18th century	19 December 1986	SP2798917991; 51°51′35″N 1°35′42″W	1182707	Morgan bale tomb about 3m east of Church of St Mary More images
Shaven Crown Hotel	Shipton-under-Wychwood	House	16th century	27 August 1959	SP2784017850; 51°51′31″N 1°35′50″W	1052553	Shaven Crown Hotel More images
Shipton Court	Shipton-under-Wychwood	Country house	c.1603	27 August 1956	SP2776517526; 51°51′20″N 1°35′54″W	1052592	Shipton Court More images
The New House with surrounding pool and garden wall to the west	Shipton-under-Wychwood	Detached House	1964	15 July 1998	SP2808417917; 51°51′33″N 1°35′37″W	1375658	Upload Photo
The Old Prebendal	Shipton-under-Wychwood	Clergy house	Perhaps 13th century	27 August 1956	SP2798518023; 51°51′36″N 1°35′42″W	1182931	The Old Prebendal
Tithe barn about 75m north-west of the Old Prebendal	Shipton-under-Wychwood	Tithe barn	14th century	27 August 1956	SP2796118063; 51°51′38″N 1°35′43″W	1284303	Upload Photo
Church of All Saints	Spelsbury	Church	11th/12th century	27 August 1957	SP3491921509; 51°53′28″N 1°29′38″W	1251447	Church of All Saints More images
Cross	Taston, Spelsbury	Village cross	Medieval	27 August 1957	SP3590822082; 51°53′46″N 1°28′46″W	1251432	Cross More images
Lodge Farmhouse	Ditchley, Spelsbury	Farmhouse	c.1770	30 August 1988	SP3938119959; 51°52′37″N 1°25′46″W	1262767	Lodge Farmhouse More images
The Rotunda about 600m WNW of Ditchley House	Ditchley Park, Spelsbury	Balustrade	c.1760	27 August 1957	SP3846621361; 51°53′22″N 1°26′33″W	1251530	Upload Photo
Church of St Giles	Standlake	Church	Late 12th century	12 September 1955	SP3972803624; 51°43′48″N 1°25′34″W	1367885	Church of St Giles More images
The Old Rectory and attached wall	Standlake	House	13th century	12 September 1955	SP3987703490; 51°43′43″N 1°25′27″W	1053147	Upload Photo
Harcourt House and attached walls and outbuildings	Stanton Harcourt	House	Mid-12th century	12 September 1955	SP4159105673; 51°44′54″N 1°23′56″W	1199690	Harcourt House and attached walls and outbuildings
Parsonage House and attached forecourt walls, gates and gatepiers and rear wall with outbuilding	Stanton Harcourt	House	16th century	12 September 1955	SP4142305905; 51°45′01″N 1°24′05″W	1199558	Upload Photo
Church of St Mary	Steeple Barton	Church	Early 14th century	27 August 1957	SP4482424896; 51°55′15″N 1°20′59″W	1052931	Church of St Mary More images
Church of St James the Great	Stonesfield	Church	13th century	27 August 1957	SP3934617094; 51°51′04″N 1°25′49″W	1053074	Church of St James the Great More images
Church of St Mary	Swerford	Church	Late 13th century	27 August 1956	SP3723831130; 51°58′39″N 1°27′33″W	1193995	Church of St Mary More images
Old Rectory	Swerford	House	Late 17th century	18 May 1987	SP3718731038; 51°58′36″N 1°27′36″W	1194004	Old Rectory
Church of St Mary	Swinbrook, Swinbrook and Widford	Church	11th century	12 September 1955	SP2798712147; 51°48′26″N 1°35′44″W	1053441	Church of St Mary More images
Church of St Oswald	Widford	Church	13th century	12 September 1955	SP2734112090; 51°48′24″N 1°36′17″W	1300619	Church of St Oswald More images
Church of St Nicholas	Tackley	Church	11th century	27 August 1957	SP4758720170; 51°52′41″N 1°18′36″W	1281634	Church of St Nicholas More images
Stables at Manor Farm	Tackley	Stable	1616	27 August 1957	SP4769820445; 51°52′50″N 1°18′30″W	1052894	Upload Photo
Church of St John the Evangelist	Taynton	Church	c.1360	12 September 1955	SP2341213544; 51°49′12″N 1°39′42″W	1300575	Church of St John the Evangelist More images
Strongs House	Taynton	House	17th century	12 September 1955	SP2324013641; 51°49′15″N 1°39′51″W	1183509	Upload Photo
Church of St Edward the Confessor	Westcott Barton	Church	12th century	27 August 1956	SP4309425685; 51°55′41″N 1°22′29″W	1285863	Church of St Edward the Confessor More images
Manor House	Westwell	Manor house	Pre-1657	12 September 1955	SP2235909883; 51°47′14″N 1°40′38″W	1357459	Upload Photo
Manor House: barn at north-east corner	Westwell	Barn	18th century	12 September 1955	SP2237709912; 51°47′15″N 1°40′37″W	1065942	Upload Photo
Manor House: boundary wall and archway at right angles to outer north-west wing	Westwell	Boundary wall	13th century	1 March 1990	SP2232709889; 51°47′14″N 1°40′40″W	1357460	Upload Photo
Manor House: dovecote about 10 metres to south-west	Westwell	Dovecote	17th century	1 March 1990	SP2234509851; 51°47′13″N 1°40′39″W	1065943	Upload Photo
The Old Rectory	Westwell	Cross-passage House	Pre-1700	12 September 1955	SP2228410020; 51°47′18″N 1°40′42″W	1065936	The Old Rectory More images
Batt House	Witney	House	Early 18th century	14 May 1952	SP3556909686; 51°47′05″N 1°29′09″W	1289128	Batt House More images
Blanket Hall	Witney	Assay Office	18th century	14 May 1952	SP3577110106; 51°47′19″N 1°28′58″W	1212999	Blanket Hall More images
Butter Cross	Witney	Market cross	1683	14 May 1952	SP3560709567; 51°47′01″N 1°29′07″W	1213348	Butter Cross More images
Henry Box School	Witney	House	Dated 1660	14 May 1952	SP3542809308; 51°46′53″N 1°29′16″W	1212271	Henry Box School More images
Manor Farmhouse	Cogges, Witney	Farmhouse	Mid-13th century	3 March 1988	SP3620009632; 51°47′03″N 1°28′36″W	1367920	Manor Farmhouse More images
St Mary's Priory House	Cogges, Witney	House	1859	3 March 1988	SP3608609652; 51°47′04″N 1°28′42″W	1053064	Upload Photo
The Hermitage	Witney	Apartment	Early 16th century	14 May 1952	SP3564609502; 51°46′59″N 1°29′05″W	1053083	Upload Photo
The Old Rectory and attached wall	Witney	Vicarage	1723	14 May 1952	SP3557909232; 51°46′50″N 1°29′08″W	1212211	The Old Rectory and attached wall
Town Hall	Witney	Town hall	c.1770–80	14 May 1952	SP3560409595; 51°47′02″N 1°29′07″W	1213347	Town Hall More images
Woodcote	Witney	House	17th century	14 May 1952	SP3561009552; 51°47′01″N 1°29′07″W	1213349	Upload Photo
Wychwood	Witney	House	Early 16th century	14 May 1952	SP3567209378; 51°46′55″N 1°29′04″W	1053044	Wychwood More images
Bartholomew House	Woodstock	House	Early 17th century	18 October 1949	SP4451816775; 51°50′52″N 1°21′18″W	1368010	Upload Photo
Church of St Mary Magdalene	Woodstock	Church	Late 12th century	18 October 1949	SP4438616716; 51°50′50″N 1°21′25″W	1262223	Church of St Mary Magdalene More images
Hope House	Woodstock	Apartment	c.1708	18 October 1949	SP4463816711; 51°50′50″N 1°21′12″W	1204018	Upload Photo
Manor Farmhouse	Old Woodstock, Woodstock	Farmhouse	Late 13th century	18 October 1949	SP4419417061; 51°51′01″N 1°21′35″W	1368040	Upload Photo
The Bear Hotel	Woodstock	House	17th century	18 October 1949	SP4441916728; 51°50′51″N 1°21′24″W	1252557	The Bear Hotel More images
The Bishop's House	Woodstock	Vicarage	Late 17th century	18 October 1949	SP4431016707; 51°50′50″N 1°21′29″W	1262191	Upload Photo
Church of St Mary	Wootton	Church	Mid-13th century	27 August 1957	SP4390319882; 51°52′33″N 1°21′49″W	1052899	Church of St Mary More images
Hordley House	Wootton	House	Mid- to late 16th century	27 August 1957	SP4467619200; 51°52′11″N 1°21′09″W	1283262	Upload Photo
Nether Worton House	Nether Worton, Worton	Manor house	Dated 1653, possibly earlier	27 August 1956	SP4252730072; 51°58′03″N 1°22′57″W	1052464	Nether Worton House More images

== See also ==
- Grade I listed buildings in West Oxfordshire
- Grade II* listed buildings in Cherwell (district)
- Grade II* listed buildings in Oxford
- Grade II* listed buildings in South Oxfordshire
- Grade II* listed buildings in Vale of White Horse
