= Bruern =

Hamlet in Oxfordshire, England

Coordinates: 51.867°N 1.636°W

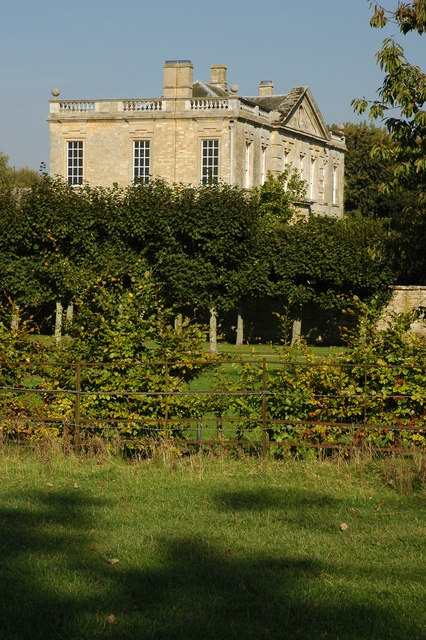
- House on the Bruern Abbey site

- Location within Oxfordshire
- Population: 62 (2001 census)
- OS grid reference: SP2518
- Civil parish: Bruern
- District: West Oxfordshire
- Shire county: Oxfordshire
- Region: South East
- Country: England
- Sovereign state: United Kingdom
- Post town: Chipping Norton
- Postcode district: OX7
- Police: Thames Valley
- Fire: Oxfordshire
- Ambulance: South Central
- UK Parliament: Witney

Bruern or Bruern Abbey is a hamlet and civil parish on the River Evenlode about 6 miles (10 km) north of Burford in West Oxfordshire. The 2001 census recorded the parish population as 62.

== Cistercian Abbey ==
In 1147 Nicholas Basset founded a Cistercian Abbey here as a daughter house of Waverley Abbey in Surrey. The Abbey held property in west Oxfordshire, east Gloucestershire and at Priddy in Somerset. There seems to have been rebuilding work in the 13th century, as Henry III gave timber in 1232, and two altars were dedicated in 1250. By 1291, the community was heavily in debt and financial problems continued throughout the later Middle Ages. In 1382 the abbey also bought the manor of Fifield, Oxfordshire. In 1532 a scandal erupted when Abbot Macy was found to have purchased his office from Cardinal Wolsey with the promise of 250 marks and 280 oak trees from the abbey estates. His attempts to recoup the costs from the abbey's income led to his deposition as abbot. At the Valor Ecclesiasticus survey of 1535 there were fifteen monks. The abbey had a net income of £124, making it one of the smaller houses. The abbey was dissolved in October 1536. After the dissolution, the Abbey became the property of Sir Anthony Cope of Hanwell, Oxfordshire, ancestor of the Cope baronets.

In 1720 a baroque country house was built for the Cope family, possibly on the site of the former abbey. It was acquired by Michael Astor in 1947, before becoming a school run by American lawyer Sterling Stover.

A Georgian cottage in the grounds of the house includes a three-bay vaulted chamber which may be a remnant of the original abbey buildings. Michael Bishop, Baron Glendonbrook, purchased the 18th-century property in 2012. The Abbey has been completely refurbished under his ownership, including the installation of "a large and impressive cantilever stone staircase and twenty-five kilometres of data cabling' as well as a 'large underground car park".

== Sources ==
- New, Anthony (1985). A Guide to the Abbeys of England And Wales. London: Constable. pp. 80–81. ISBN 0-09-463520-X.
- Page, William, ed. (1907). "9. The Abbey of Bruern". A History of the County of Oxford. Victoria County History. Vol. 2: Ecclesiastical History, etc. Westminster: Archibald Constable & Co. pp. 79–81.
- Sherwood, Jennifer; Pevsner, Nikolaus (1974). Oxfordshire. The Buildings of England. Harmondsworth: Penguin. pp. 499–500. ISBN 0-14-071045-0.
