= Apron (architecture) =

Type of stonework ornament

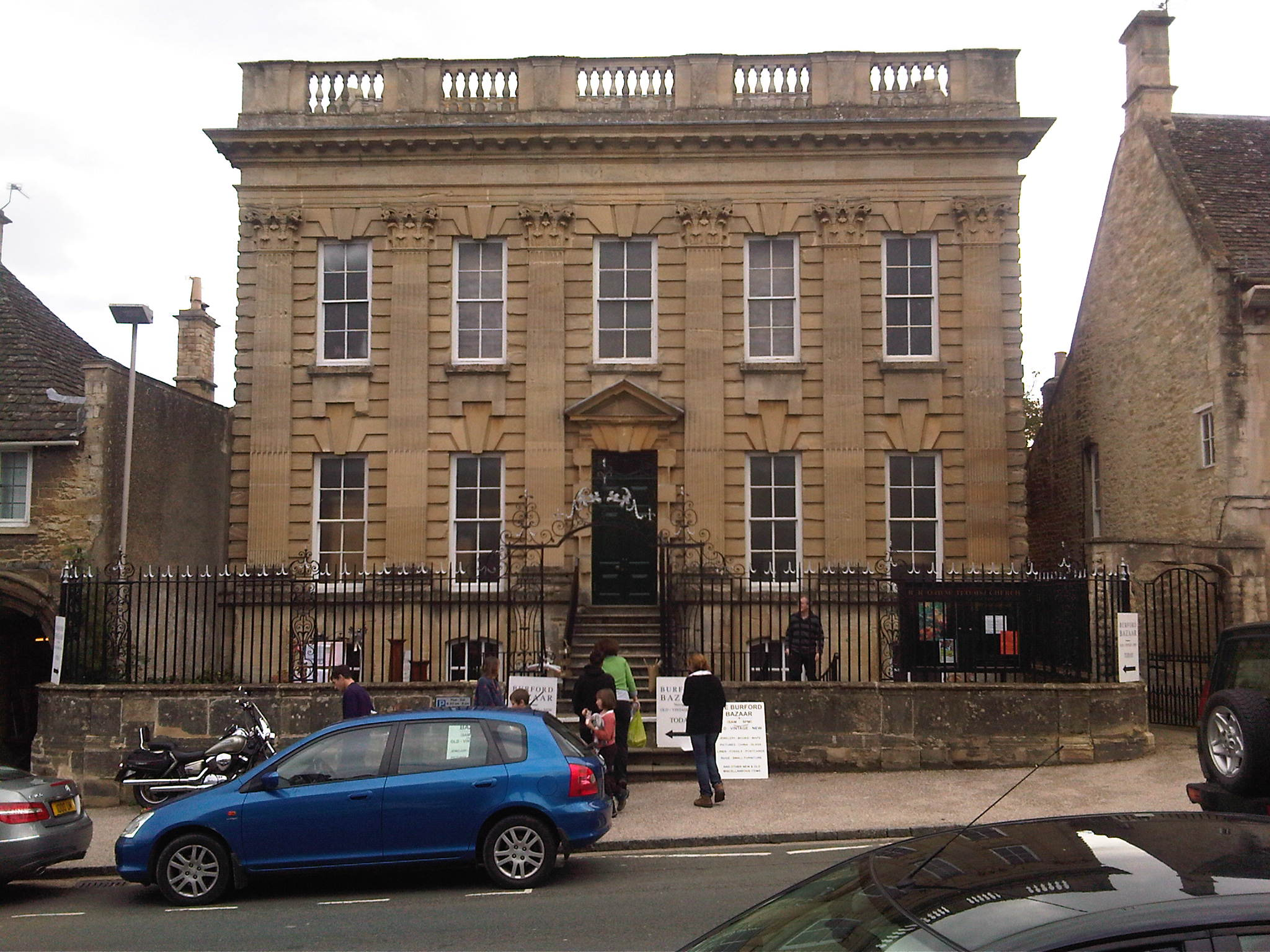
Burford Methodist Church has aprons beneath its five upper windows.

An apron is a raised section of ornamental stonework below a window ledge, stone tablet, or monument.

Aprons were used by Roman engineers to build Roman bridges. The main function of apron was to surround the feet of the piers.
