= Burford Tolsey Museum =

Municipal building in Burford, Oxfordshire, England

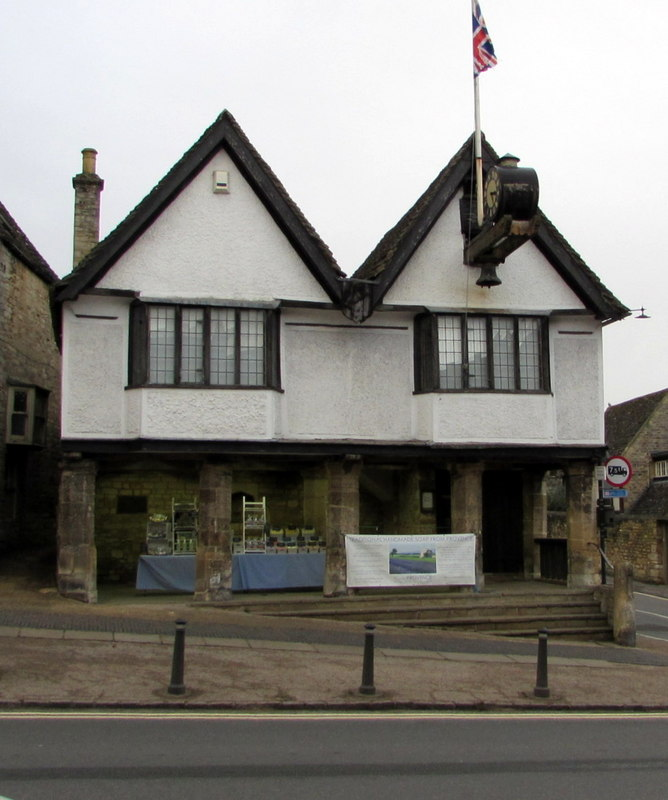
- Burford Tolsey Museum

- Shown in Oxfordshire
- 51.8073°N 1.6370°W
- Location: High Street, Burford

History
- Built: 1520

Site notes
- Architectural style: Tudor style

Listed Building – Grade II*
- Official name: The Tolsey
- Designated: 12 September 1955
- Reference no.: 1224632

The Burford Tolsey Museum is a local museum in the town of Burford, west Oxfordshire, England. It is located in a Tudor style structure, known as The Tolsey, (Note: Tolsey is an ancient word for a tollbooth.) and was formerly where market tolls were collected and where town meetings may have been held in the upper chamber. It is a Grade II* listed building.

== History ==
=== The building ===
The Tolsey was designed in the Tudor style, built using half-timbering techniques and was completed in 1520. Surveys using dendrology have dated the timbers back to 1525 although the first documented reference to the building was not until 1561. The building was raised on stone pillars so that markets could be held, with an assembly room on the first floor. The design involved a symmetrical main frontage with two bays facing onto the High Street; the first floor was fenestrated by bay windows and surmounted by gables. The ground floor was the place for wool merchants to meet in medieval times. Tolls for the use of the market facilities and taxes were also collected on behalf of the lord of the manor. The assembly room was used as a venue for borough court hearings and also operated as the local town hall. The room was furnished with a chair, a table and a chest of drawers bearing the coat of arms of Burford Corporation.

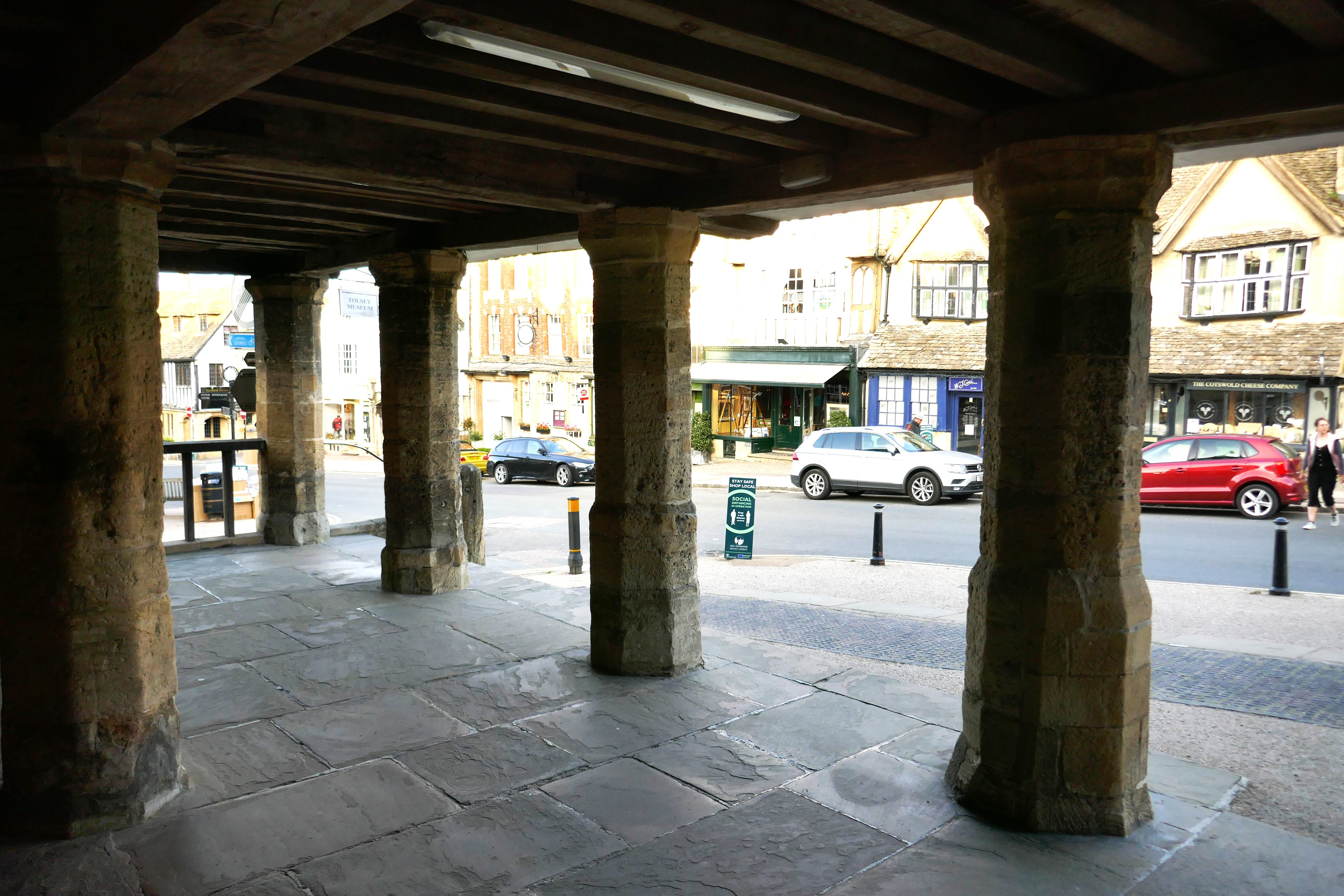
View from the Tolsey

A lock-up for petty criminals was established at the rear of the building in the late 16th century, a projecting beam which supported a clock, with a bell suspended below, was installed in the right-hand gable in the 17th century, and a horse-drawn fire engine was acquired for the town and stored on the ground floor in the late 18th century. After Burford Corporation was disbanded in 1861, ownership of the building was transferred to trustees. The building fell into a state of disrepair in the first half of the 20th century although it was extensively refurbished in 1955.

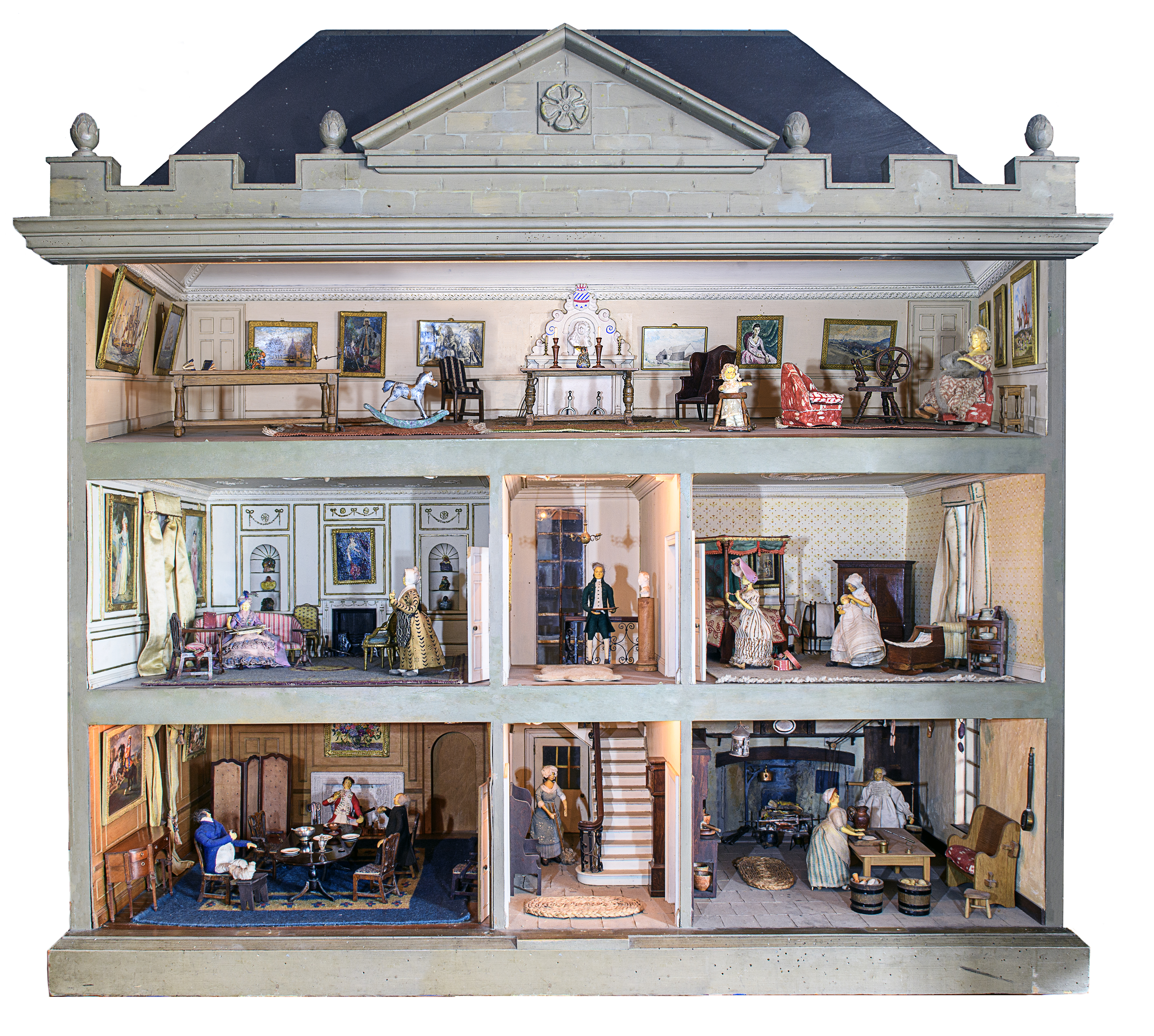
Doll's House

== The museum ==
A leading Burford antique dealer, Roger Warner, who had been collecting objects with a known Burford connection since the 1930’s, ranging from rope-making tools to a boxwood clarinet, donated his collection to enable the museum to open as a local history museum in 1960.

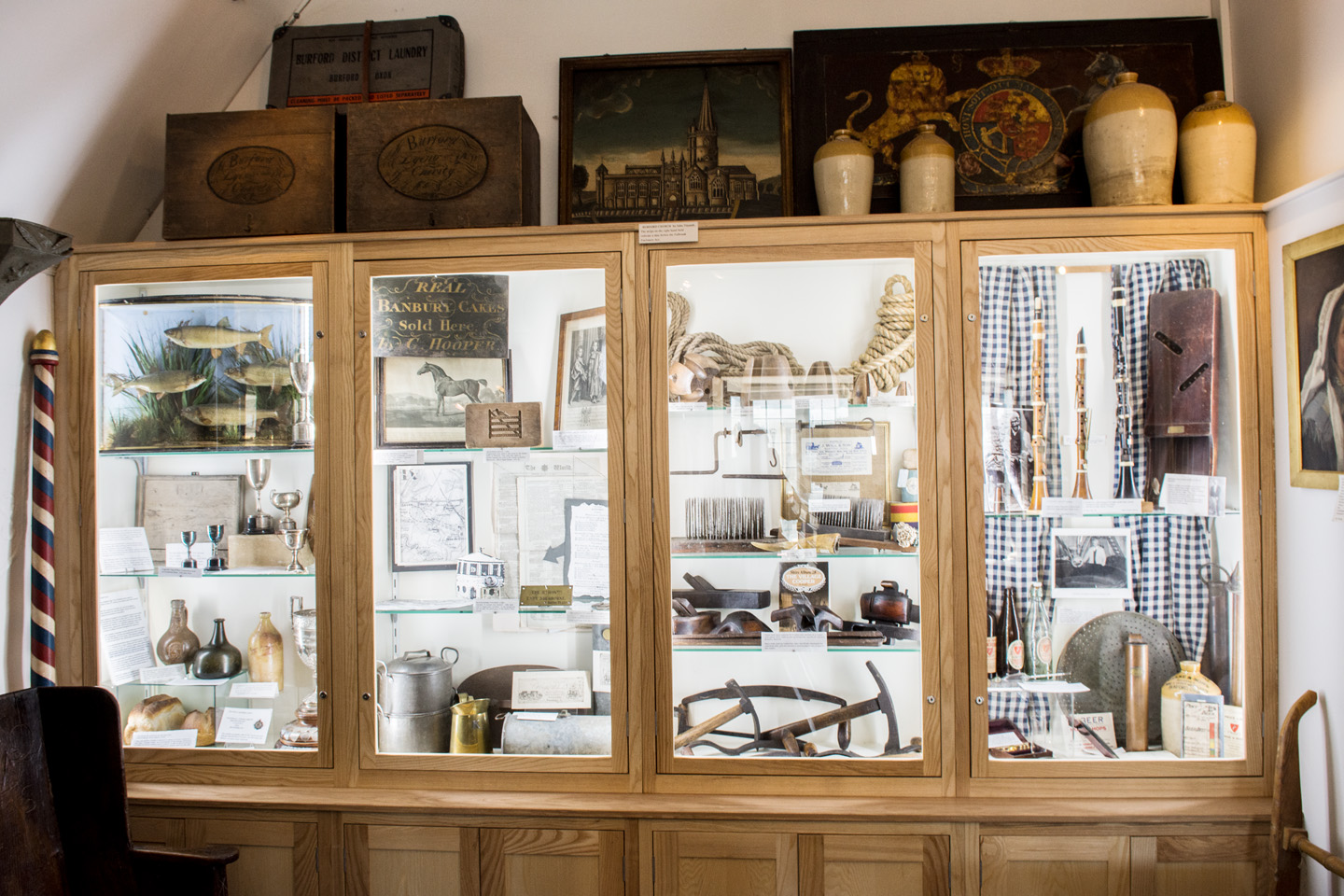
Display cabinet at the Burford Tolsey Museum

The museum which was recorded as such in the BBC Domesday Project in 1986.

The Museum is open 2-5 p.m. every day from April to October, weekends only in November & December and closed January to March. Admission is free. Donations are invited.

== The archive ==
When in November 2022, the Burford Tolsey Archive was opened in an historic nearby barn in Swan Lane to collect, preserve and share Burford’s written and oral stories and images, the Registered Charity No. 309176 was renamed the Burford Tolsey Museum & Archive.

== See also ==
- List of museums in Oxfordshire
- Grade II* listed buildings in West Oxfordshire
- Museum of Oxford
