= Chipping Norton Town Hall =

Municipal building in Oxfordshire, England

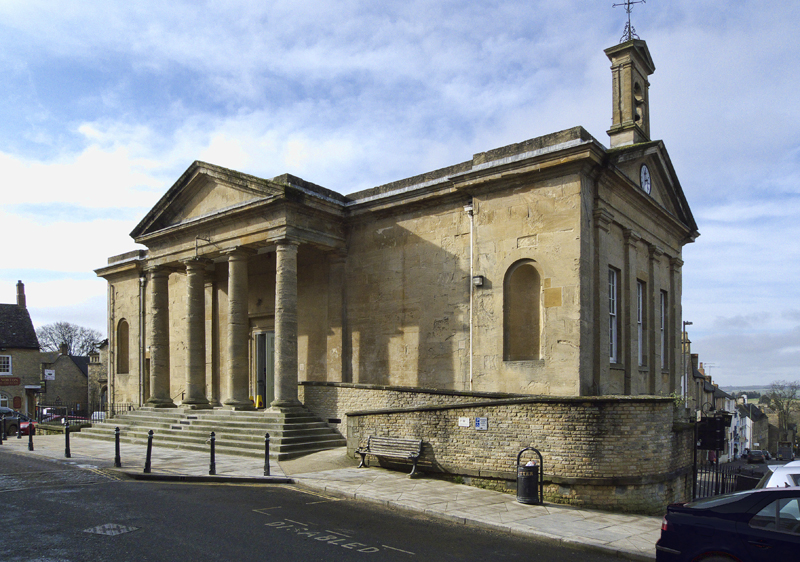
- Chipping Norton Town Hall

- Shown in Oxfordshire
- 51.9411°N 1.5456°W
- Location: Market Place, Chipping Norton

History
- Built: 1842

Site notes
- Architect: George Stanley Repton
- Architectural style: Palladian style

Listed Building – Grade II*
- Official name: Town Hall, Market Place
- Designated: 23 April 1952
- Reference no.: 1183188

Chipping Norton Town Hall is a municipal building in the Market Place, Chipping Norton, Oxfordshire, England. The building, which is used as an events venue, is a Grade II* listed building.

== History ==
The first municipal building in the town was a guildhall which was built for the Guild of the Holy Trinity in 1520. Following the dissolution of the chantries in 1548, the guildhall was acquired by the town and subsequently used by civic leaders as their meeting place. (Note: The guildhall was subsequently auctioned and used by private owners for a variety of purposes before being acquired by the former member of parliament, Albert Brassey, in 1902. Brassey presented it to the borough council and it was subsequently used as a classroom, as a library and also as the town clerk's office.) In the early 1840s, the local member of parliament, James Langston, led a campaign to commission a more substantial structure. The site he selected was occupied by an ancient market house with nine pillars and a pyramid-shaped roof which was demolished to make way for the new structure.

The new building was designed by George Stanley Repton in the Palladian style, built in ashlar stone and was completed in 1842. The design involved a symmetrical main frontage with nine bays facing onto the east side of the High Street. It featured a flight of seven steps leading up to a tetrastyle portico with Doric order columns supporting an entablature and a pediment; there were niches in the outer bays on the front elevation. The western elevation was arcaded on the ground floor and was fenestrated by seven tall sash windows flanked by pilasters supporting an entablature; there were again niches in the end bays, which slightly projected forward. The end elevations were arcaded on the ground floor and were fenestrated by rows of three sash windows flanked by pilasters supporting entablatures and pediments. The northern pediment was surmounted by a bellcote; some years later a clock (manufactured by local clockmaker Samuel Simms, c. 1849) was placed in the tympanum below. (Note: Following the fire in 1950 it was replaced with an electric clock by John Smith and Sons, Derby.) Internally, the principal rooms on the ground floor were the four cells for the incarceration of pretty criminals, the weighbridge for measuring the weight of goods being traded and the space for the horse-drawn fire engine, while the principal room on the first floor was the council chamber which was also used as a court room.

A grand dinner was held in the town hall in August 1855 to celebrate the official opening of the Chipping Norton Railway. A weather vane, designed in the form of a foxhound, was presented to the town by the Heythrop Hunt and installed at the top of the bellcote in March 1950. The building was badly damaged in a fire on 3 March 1950: while the shell of the building survived, much of the interior was destroyed. It continued to serve as the local seat of government until the enlarged West Oxfordshire District Council was formed at Witney in 1974, and subsequently continued to be used as a venue for major events such as the local Brexit debate in June 2016.

Works of art in the town hall include a portrait by Walter William Ouless of the member of parliament, Albert Brassey, a portrait by Edward S. Harper of the former mayor, Alderman Henry Field Wilkins and a portrait by an unknown artist of the local politician, James Langston.

== See also ==
- Grade II* listed buildings in West Oxfordshire
