= Burford Methodist Church =

Church in Burford, Oxfordshire, England

Coordinates: 51°48′30″N 1°38′10″W

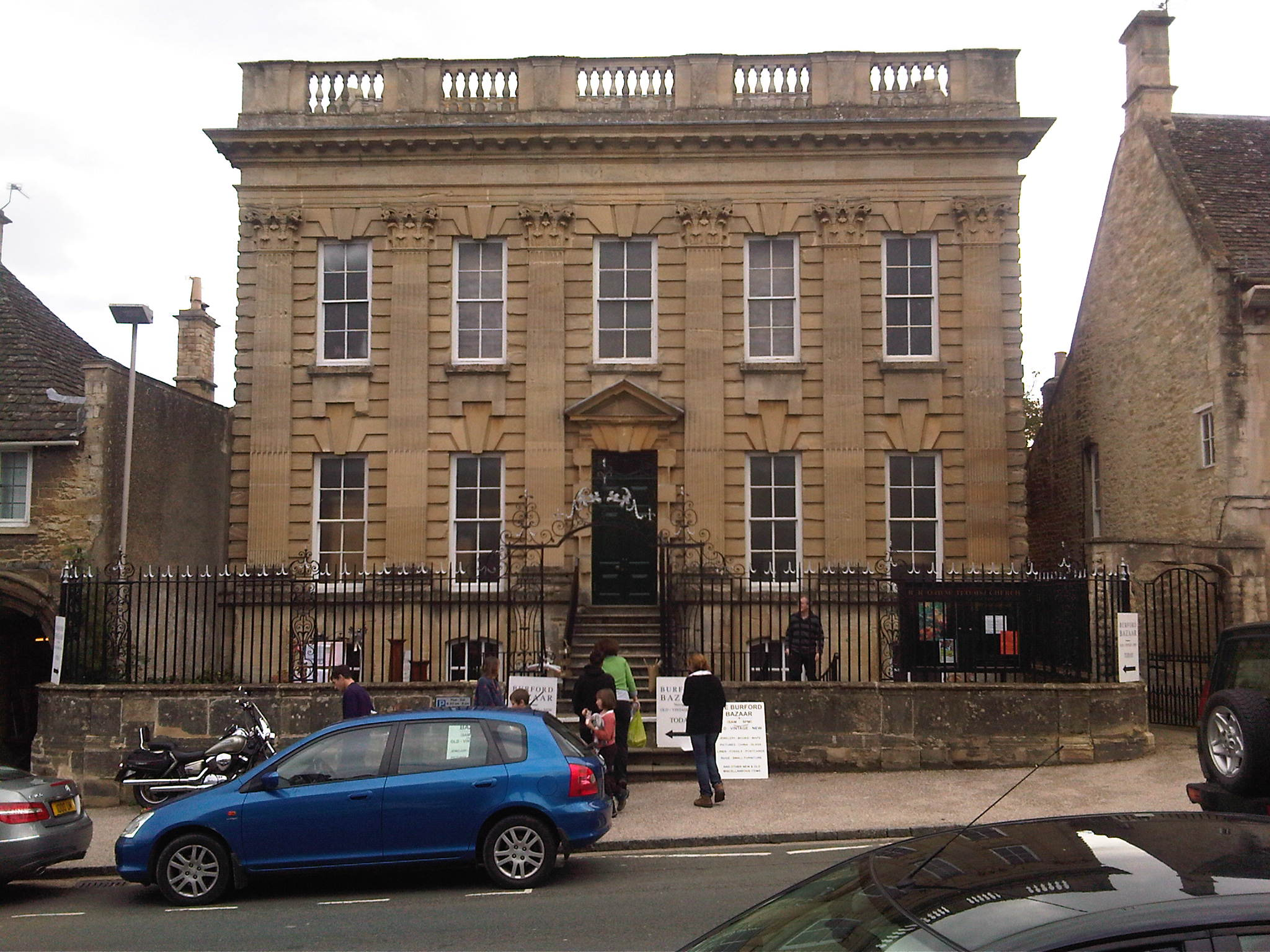
Burford Methodist Church was built as an early 18th-century provincial town house.

Burford Methodist Church is a baroque building in the High Street of Burford, Oxfordshire. It was built between about 1715 and 1730 as a private house and converted in 1849 to a Wesleyan Chapel. It is a Grade II* Listed Building.

== Ethos ==
Baroque architecture flowered for only a very brief period in Britain's architectural history, reaching its apex under the guidance of such architects as John Vanbrugh and Nicholas Hawksmoor who transformed the more florid European style of Baroque, as promoted by Christopher Wren, into a more severe form peculiar to Britain. There, Baroque tended to be favoured by the travelled upper classes, who had seen the genre in mainland Europe, however, even by this minority it was not universally admired. When John Vanbrugh persuaded the government and the saviour of England, John Churchill, 1st Duke of Marlborough, to permit him to design Blenheim Palace in the Baroque style, Marlborough's wife the formidable Sarah, Duchess of Marlborough was accompanied by a large group of intellectuals, who included Alexander Pope, in being strongly critical.

Therefore, to find an early example of the Baroque in the high street of a small provincial English town is unusual, more unusual, is that the building sits on a small site still surrounded by its original neighbours - older, smaller medieval buildings which though rare today in their surviving quantity and composition are of little individual architectural merit and serve to accentuate the height and classicism of their more refined neighbour; thus, the church retains a setting which is part of Baroque architecture's original concept - the element of surprise; until the early 20th century, this was exemplified by the sight of St. Peter's Basilica rising incongruously out of the jumble of medieval architecture that was the Borgo before the creation of the Via della Conciliazione, which although it has created a grand approach and perspective to the Basilica has taken away the Baroque element of surprise as one suddenly came upon the Piazza San Pietro from the jumble of narrow streets and small squares.

== Architecture ==
The church was designed as a private house, for a local lawyer, John Jordan. The building is on three floors, a high and clearly visible semi-basement, which would have contained the kitchens and domestic secondary rooms; the first floor which was the principal floor containing the main reception rooms and entrance; and the 2nd floor containing principal bedrooms. Given the date of the house, it's possible that the principal bedroom was on the first floor in the piano nobile style, but no documentary evidence survives describing the original layout.

The front (and only) façade is fully rusticated from the 1st floor upwards; it is of five bays divided by six fluted pilasters surmounted by Corinthian capitals which are united by an entablature supporting a balustraded parapet. The principal entrance which occupies the central bay of the first floor is heavily pedimented in the style of James Gibbs and reached by a flight of steps which rise over and shield from view the entrance to semi-basement. This secondary entrance to the house, intended only for use by servants and tradesmen is reached by a descending, segmented external double staircase, a common enough feature in a baroque house ascending the principal entrance, but rare when descending to a secondary entrance.

The windows are ornamented by dropped keystones and aprons. In order to maintain the scale and perspective of the building, the windows are by necessity long and narrow this creates an illusion of greater height — illusion being a typical Baroque feature. The illusion has been somewhat modified, however, by the late 19th century replacement glazing bars on the first and second floors. The glazing bars on the ground floor, which are likely to be original, give smaller panes which are more in the English Baroque style as seen at other contemporary baroque buildings, such as Easton Neston. The crowded features of the Baroque façade are not dissimilar to those at Heythrop Park, also in Oxfordshire, where Francis Smith, the architect, worked as building contractor.

== Conversion to a chapel ==
In 1849 the house was sold and converted into a church. The conversion work involved the complete gutting of the upper two floors. These became one vast hall intended for use as worship. A large indoor balcony, intended to provide extra seating, was erected at first floor level and the ornamental urns which decorated the balustraded parapet were removed as "inconsistent with the sacred character of the building."

== Present use ==
The building was still used as a Methodist church and was part of the Witney and Faringdon Methodist circuit. As of 2023 the church has closed and is for sale with agents Fisher German https://www.rightmove.co.uk/properties/141151295#/?channel=RES_BUY

== References and further reading ==
- Sherwood, Jennifer; Pevsner, Nikolaus (1974). Oxfordshire. The Buildings of England. Harmondsworth: Penguin Books. pp. 508–509. ISBN 0-14-071045-0.
- Green, David (1982) [1951]. Blenheim Palace. Oxford: Alden Press. pp. not cited.
- Nicolson, Nigel (1965). Great Houses of Britain. London: Hamlyn Publishing Group. pp. not cited. ISBN 0-600-01651-X.
- "Baroque Architecture". Art Encyclopaedia: 2012. visual-arts-cork.com. 2012.
