= Fulbrook, Oxfordshire =

Village in Oxfordshire, England

Coordinates: 51.815°N 1.625°W

Fulbrook
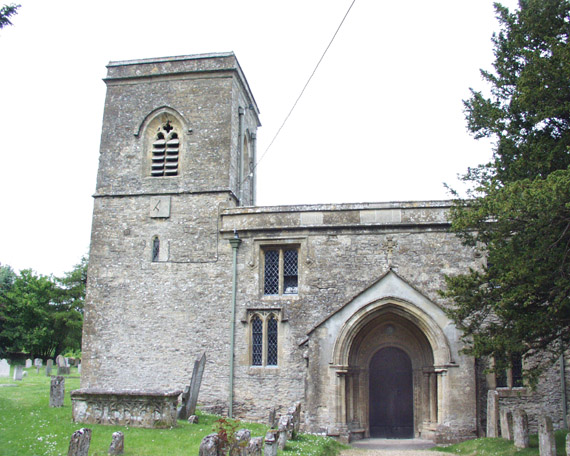
- St James the Great parish church

- Location within Oxfordshire
- Population: 437 (2011 Census)
- OS grid reference: SP2512
- Civil parish: Fulbrook
- District: West Oxfordshire
- Shire county: Oxfordshire
- Region: South East
- Country: England
- Sovereign state: United Kingdom
- Post town: Burford
- Postcode district: OX18
- Dialling code: 01993
- Police: Thames Valley
- Fire: Oxfordshire
- Ambulance: South Central
- UK Parliament: Witney
- Website: Fulbrook Parish Website

Fulbrook is a village and civil parish immediately northeast of Burford in West Oxfordshire. The 2011 Census recorded the parish's population as 437.

== History ==
The Domesday Book of 1086 recorded the village as Fulebroc, possibly meaning "foul brook". Ladyham, a half-timbered house beside the River Windrush, was built in the 16th century and had a five-bay façade added in the Georgian era. Westhall Hill Manor is 16th or 17th century, also with Georgian additions.

== Parish church ==
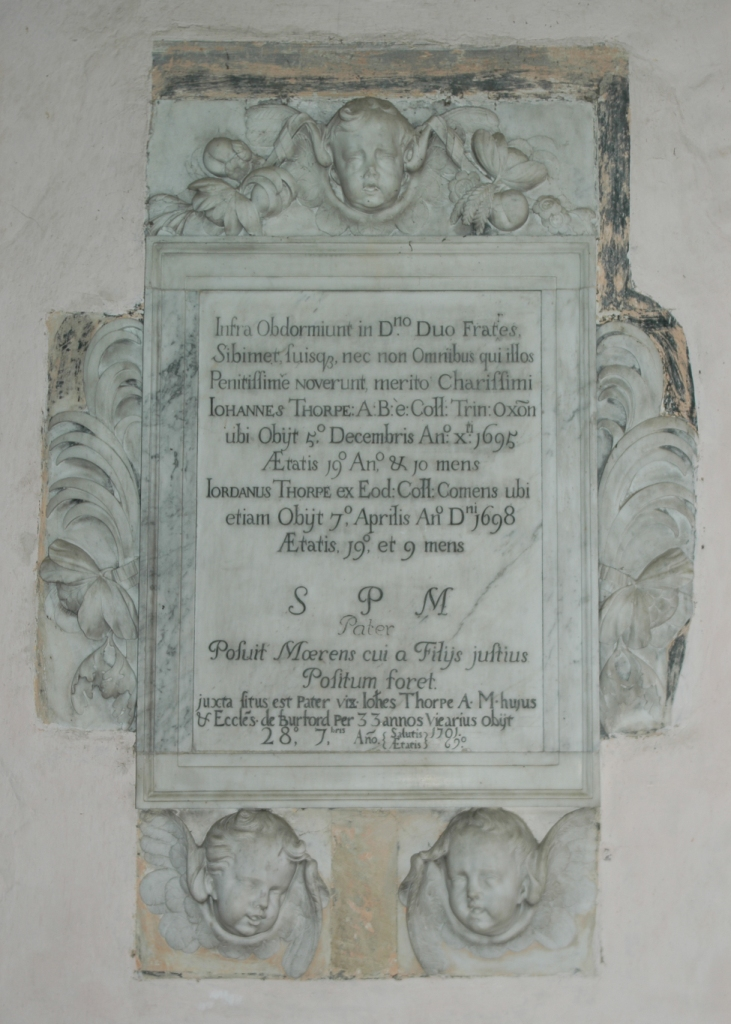
English Baroque monument in St James' parish church to John and Jordan Thorpe, two brothers who studied at Trinity College, Oxford and predeceased their father

The Church of England parish church of Saint James the Great is Norman. The north aisle was added about 1200, linked with the nave by a four-bay arcade in the Transitional style between Norman and Early English Gothic. In the 13th century the chancel was remodelled and the north transept were added, both in Early English Gothic. The south porch was added later in the same century. The east window of the chancel, the west window of the north aisle and one window in the south wall or the aisle are also 13th century. Later a clerestory was added to the nave and new Perpendicular Gothic windows were inserted in the south walls of the nave and chancel. In the 15th century the bell tower was built into the west end of the nave.

A wooden plaque on the south wall of the nave records that the church was completely re-roofed in 1827. A second plaque records that the church was restored in 1892, with the architects being Ewan Christian for the chancel and "Messrs Waller" for the nave and tower. This may refer to the architect and antiquarian Frederick S. Waller of Gloucester. The parish war memorial in the north aisle was lettered by Ninian Comper and dedicated in 1952. The ecclesiastical parish of St James the Great is now part of the United Benefice of Burford, Fulbrook, Taynton, Asthall, Swinbrook and Widford.

Edward Neale of Burford cast St. James' sanctus bell in 1649 and the tenor and treble bells in 1662. Henry III Bagley, who had bell-foundries at Chacombe in Northamptonshire and Witney in Oxfordshire, cast an additional bell for St James' in 1732. In 2004 the original bells were removed and a new frame was installed. The Neale sanctus bell was retained, the largest of the Neale bells was re-hung as the tenor and the Bagley bell was also re-hung. A new treble bell and two other new bells, all cast by the Whitechapel Bell Foundry in 2003 and 2004, were added. A former buoy bell that John Taylor & Co of Loughborough cast in 1968 for Trinity House was restored and added to the tower to complete the present ring of six bells. The original Neale treble bell was removed to Burford where it is now displayed in St. John the Baptist parish church, Burford.

== Amenities ==
Fulbrook used to have two public houses: the Carpenters Arms and the Masons Arms, although the Masons Arms has closed as a pub and is now a private house, leaving only The Carpenters Arms which also serves food.

== Sources ==
- Anonymous. Church of St. James the Great Fulbrook Oxfordshire. Fulbrook: Parish of St. James the Great, Fulbrook.
- Sherwood, Jennifer; Pevsner, Nikolaus (1974). Oxfordshire. The Buildings of England. Harmondsworth: Penguin Books. pp. 609–610. ISBN 0-14-071045-0.
