= Fifield, Oxfordshire =

Village in Oxfordshire, England

Coordinates: 51.870°N 1.655°W

Fifield
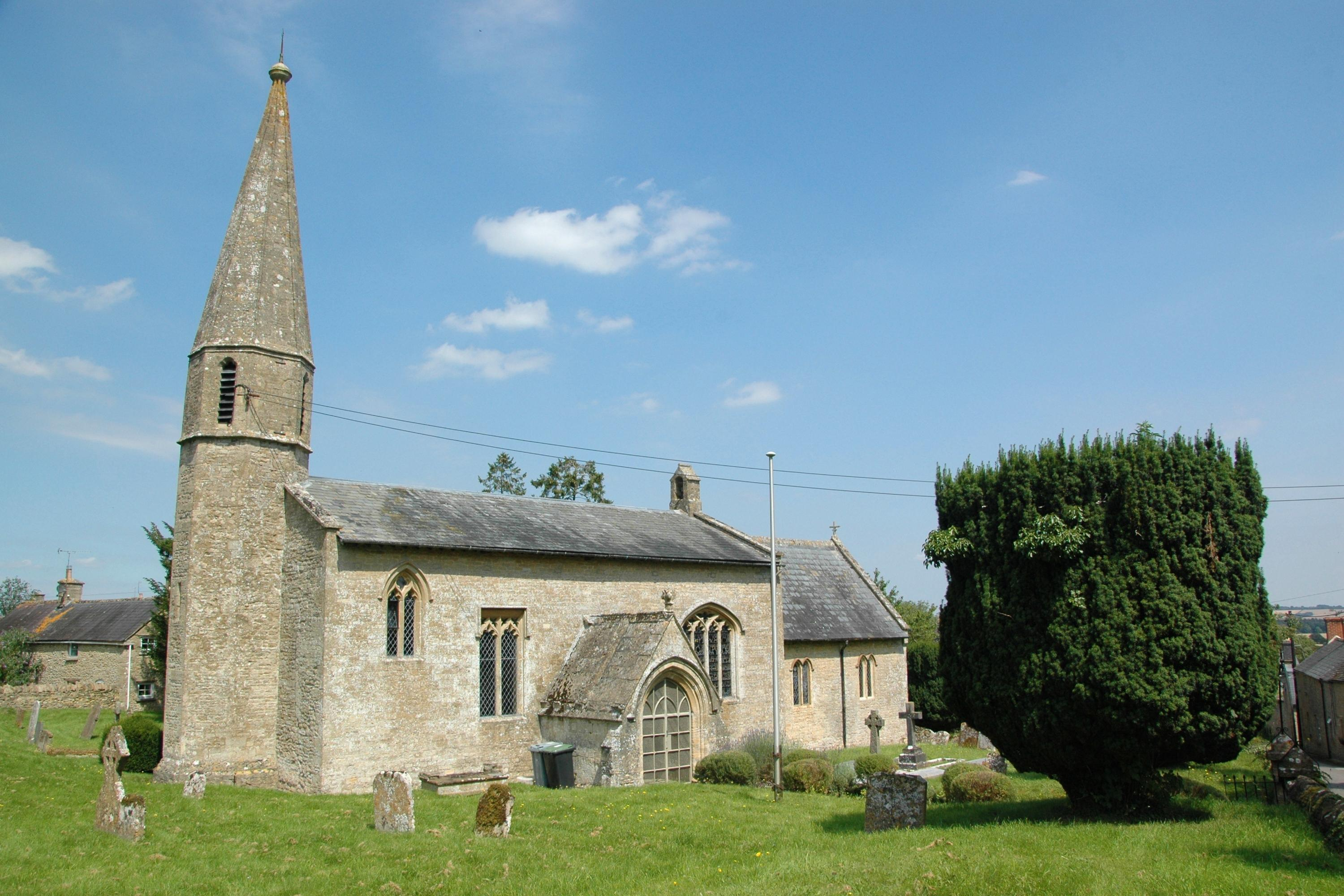
- St John the Baptist parish church

- Location within Oxfordshire
- Population: 240 (2011 Census)
- OS grid reference: SP2318
- Civil parish: Fifield
- District: West Oxfordshire
- Shire county: Oxfordshire
- Region: South East
- Country: England
- Sovereign state: United Kingdom
- Post town: Chipping Norton
- Postcode district: OX7
- Dialling code: 01993
- Police: Thames Valley
- Fire: Oxfordshire
- Ambulance: South Central
- UK Parliament: Witney

Fifield is a village and civil parish about 4 miles (6.4 km) north of Burford in Oxfordshire. The western boundary of the parish forms part of the county boundary with Gloucestershire. The 2011 Census recorded the parish's population as 240.

== Archaeology ==
In the parish nearly 1 1/2 miles (2.4 km) west of the village is a Neolithic long barrow dating from between 3400 and 2400 BC. It is 157 feet (48 m) long, up to 92 feet (28 m) wide and up to 6 feet (1.8 m) high. It had a stone-lined passage about 66 feet (20 m) long, starting at its northeast end and ending in a small burial chamber. The barrow was partly excavated in 1934. It is a scheduled monument.

== History ==
The toponym is probably derived from its Old English name of Fifhides. The Domesday Book of 1086 records Fifield:

"Henry de Ferrers holds Fifield There are five hides. Land for seven ploughs. Now in demesne 2 ploughs and 4 slaves and 9 villans with 4 bordars have 5 ploughs. There are 24 acres of meadow. Pasture one league in length and one breadth. It was and is worth 100 shillings."

== Parish church ==
The Church of England parish church of St John the Baptist is early 13th-century with a 14th-century tower and porch. The nave was partly rebuilt in 1840. It was restored in 1897 to designs by T. E. Collcutt, who added the north vestry. The church is a Grade II* listed building. The tower has a ring of three bells. The second bell was cast in about 1399 by a bell-foundry that then existed in Wokingham, Berkshire. Abraham II Rudhall of Gloucester cast the tenor bell in 1725. James Bagley of Chacombe, Northamptonshire cast the treble bell in 1746. For technical reasons the bells are currently unringable. St John's also has a Sanctus bell that was cast by an unknown founder around 1499. St John's parish is part of the Benefice of Shipton-under-Wychwood with Milton-under-Wychwood, Fifield and Idbury.

== RAF Little Rissington ==
In 1938 RAF Little Rissington was opened west of Fifield. Its periphery straddles the county boundary and includes Fifield long barrow.

== Sources and further reading ==
- Harden, D.B. (1954). "Scheduled Monuments in Oxfordshire" (PDF). Oxoniensia. XIX. Oxford Architectural and Historical Society: 137–145.
- Sherwood, Jennifer; Pevsner, Nikolaus (1974). Oxfordshire. The Buildings of England. Harmondsworth: Penguin Books. p. 603. ISBN 0-14-071045-0.
- Williams, Ann; Martin, G.H., eds. (2003). Domesday Book: A Complete Translation. Harmondsworth: Penguin Books. ISBN 0-14-143994-7.
