= Taynton, Oxfordshire =

Village in Oxfordshire, England

Coordinates: 51.821°N 1.663°W

Taynton
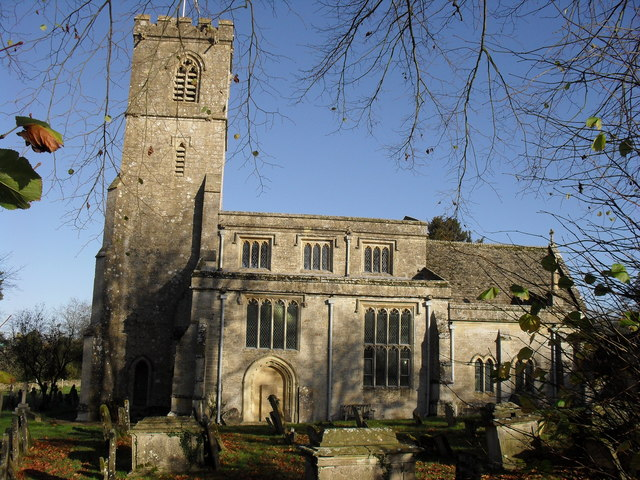
- St John the Evangelist parish church

- Location within Oxfordshire
- Population: 108 (2001 Census)
- OS grid reference: SP2313
- Civil parish: Taynton
- District: West Oxfordshire
- Shire county: Oxfordshire
- Region: South East
- Country: England
- Sovereign state: United Kingdom
- Post town: Burford
- Postcode district: OX18
- Dialling code: 01993
- Police: Thames Valley
- Fire: Oxfordshire
- Ambulance: South Central
- UK Parliament: Witney

Taynton is a village and civil parish about 1 1/2 miles (2.4 km) northwest of Burford in West Oxfordshire. The village is on Coombe Brook, a tributary of the River Windrush. The parish is bounded in the south by the River Windrush, in the north partly by Coombe Brook and its tributary Hazelden Brook, in the west by the county boundary with Gloucestershire and in the east by field boundaries. The 2001 Census recorded the parish's population as 108.

== Manor ==
In 1059, King Edward the Confessor granted the manor of Taynton to the Abbey of Saint Denis near Paris. The present manor house was built in the 17th century and has been much altered since.

== Parish church ==
The Church of England parish church of Saint John the Evangelist has a Decorated Gothic north aisle and arcade dating from about 1360. The east window of the south aisle is also Decorated Gothic, but the present south arcade and the rest of the south aisle are Perpendicular Gothic work from the end of the 15th century. The clerestory of the nave was added at the same time. The bell tower also is Perpendicular Gothic. The chancel was rebuilt in 1865 to plans by the architect W.F. Poulton. The church is a Grade II* listed building. The tower has a ring of six bells. Abraham I Rudhall of Gloucester cast the fourth and fifth bells in 1717. Thomas Bond of Burford cast the treble, second, fifth and tenor bells in 1937. St John's has also a Sanctus bell of unknown date. The parish of St John the Evangelist is now part of the Benefice of Burford, Fulbrook, Taynton, Asthall, Swinbrook, and Widford.

== Economic and social history ==
The Domesday Book records that in 1086 Taynton had two water mills. There is still a Taynton Mill in the Windrush valley downstream from Coombe Brook's confluence with the river. The Manor of Taynton's other mill may have been 14 miles (23 km) away at Northmoor, where the Manor of Taynton held land.

=== Taynton stone ===
The Domesday Book records a quarry at Taynton. The Taynton Limestone Formation is a Middle Jurassic Cotswold limestone. It is a high-quality freestone that for centuries has been used for ashlar and other precision masonry. The quarries, now all disused, are on the east side of the valley of Coombe Brook, starting 1/2-mile (800 m) north of the village and extending another 1 1/2 miles (2.4 km) up the valley.

The earliest record of a building using Taynton stone is from 1310, when it was used at Merton College, Oxford. Taynton supplied stone for many of the older colleges of the University of Oxford, Windsor Castle, Old St Paul's Cathedral, and Eton College. The original statues around the Sheldonian Theatre in Oxford (carved in the 17th century and since replaced) were Taynton stone.Early in the 18th century Taynton supplied some of the stone for Blenheim Palace. "Rally Quarr", almost 2 miles (3 km) north of the village, is a corruption of "Railway Quarry". It was worked in 1846–52 for stone to build bridges in the Windrush Valley for the Oxford, Worcester and Wolverhampton Railway. Taynton stone was used in Oxford to widen Magdalen Bridge over the River Cherwell in 1882 and to build the New Bodleian Library in 1937–39. Stone was still being quarried in the parish in 1974.

The navigability of the River Thames affected Taynton's ability to supply building stone. Originally the stone was taken 14 miles (23 km) overland to Eynsham before being loaded onto barges. However, when Eton College was being built in the 15th century, navigation on the Upper Thames was so bad that stone was taken overland 40 miles (64 km) to river wharves at Henley-on-Thames. In the 17th and 18th centuries the river was sometimes navigable upstream from Eynsham, so barges loaded the stone at Radcot, 12 miles (19 km) from Taynton. Despite transport limitations in earlier centuries, products from Taynton sometimes included substantial monoliths. In the 17th century Robert Plot recorded that Sir Compton Reade had a stone mash tun made at Taynton that measured 6 3/8×3 3/8×4 1/2 feet (1.9×1.0×1.4 m) and held about 65 bushels (about 2,400 litres). A team of 21 horses hauled it by road from Taynton to Shipton-under-Wychwood, a distance of about 4 miles (6.4 km).

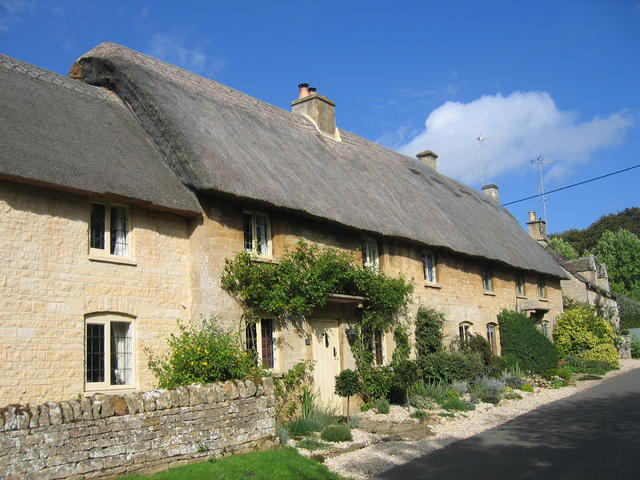
Thatched 18th-century cottages opposite Manor Farm

=== Local buildings ===
No. 16, or Strong's House, is a gable-fronted house with a date stone of 1676. It was built for Thomas Strong, who was master mason to Sir Christopher Wren. It is a Grade II* listed building. As well as the manor house and Strong's House, a number of other houses in the village date from the 17th century. No. 5 is much restored but in its garden are two gothic stone window frames that may be medieval. The village school was built in 1877 and a post office had opened by 1895. Neither remains open today.

The Old Vicarage is a listed building. Gillian Tindall has written about its history, and that of the village, in her book Three Houses, Many Lives (2012).

== Sources ==
- Arkell, W.J. (1947). Oxford Stone. London: Faber and Faber. pp. 54–67, 75–78, etc.
- Baggs, A.P.; Chance, Eleanor; Colvin, Christina; Day, C.J.; Selwyn, Nesta; Townley, Simon C. (1996). Crossley, Alan; Currie, C.R.J. (eds.). A History of the County of Oxford. Victoria County History. Vol. 13: Bampton Hundred (Part One). London: Oxford University Press for the Institute of Historical Research. pp. 158–165. ISBN 978-0-19722-790-9.
- Kelly, ed. (1895). Kelly's Directory of Oxfordshire. London: Kelly & Co. Ltd. p. 285.
- Lobel, Mary D, ed. (1962). A History of the County of Oxford. Victoria County History. Vol. 7: Thame and Dorchester Hundreds. London: Oxford University Press for the Institute of Historical Research. pp. 27–39.
- Salzman, L.F., ed. (1939). A History of the County of Oxford. Victoria County History. Vol. 1. London: Archibald Constable & Co. pp. 330–345, 373–395.
- Sherwood, Jennifer; Pevsner, Nikolaus (1974). Oxfordshire. The Buildings of England. Harmondsworth: Penguin Books. pp. 804–805. ISBN 0-14-071045-0.
