= Bear Hotel, Woodstock =

Hotel in Woodstock, Oxfordshire, England

The Bear Hotel
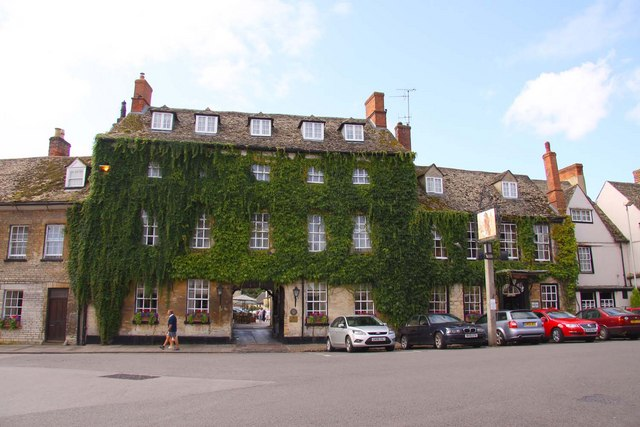
- Interactive map of the The Bear Hotel area

General information
- Location: Woodstock, Oxfordshire, England, Park Street, Woodstock, Oxfordshire, OX20 ISZ
- Coordinates: 51°50′48″N 1°21′23″W
- Opening: 13th century
- Operator: MacDonald Hotels and Resorts

Other information
- Number of rooms: 53
- Number of restaurants: 1

Website
- https://www.macdonaldhotels.co.uk/bear

The Bear Hotel is a hotel in Woodstock, Oxfordshire, located opposite The Oxfordshire Museum, not far from Blenheim Palace. It is one of England's original 13th-century coaching inns and has stone walls, oak beams, open fireplaces and an ivy facade. The hotel has 53 bedrooms and its restaurant has 2 A.A. Rosettes and 2 RAC Dining Awards. It is run by MacDonald Hotels and Resorts. Notable guests include Richard Burton and Elizabeth Taylor who stayed at the hotel on many occasions in the Marlboro suite.

== Local legend ==
At least two of the bedrooms in the hotel are said to be haunted; room 16 is said to be haunted by a female ghost who turns lights on and off. Guests have reported their possessions being moved on many occasions in one of the rooms. Also, employees are said to avoid being alone in the kitchen and the cellar at night.
