= St Giles' Church, Standlake =

- Parish Church of St Giles, Standlake
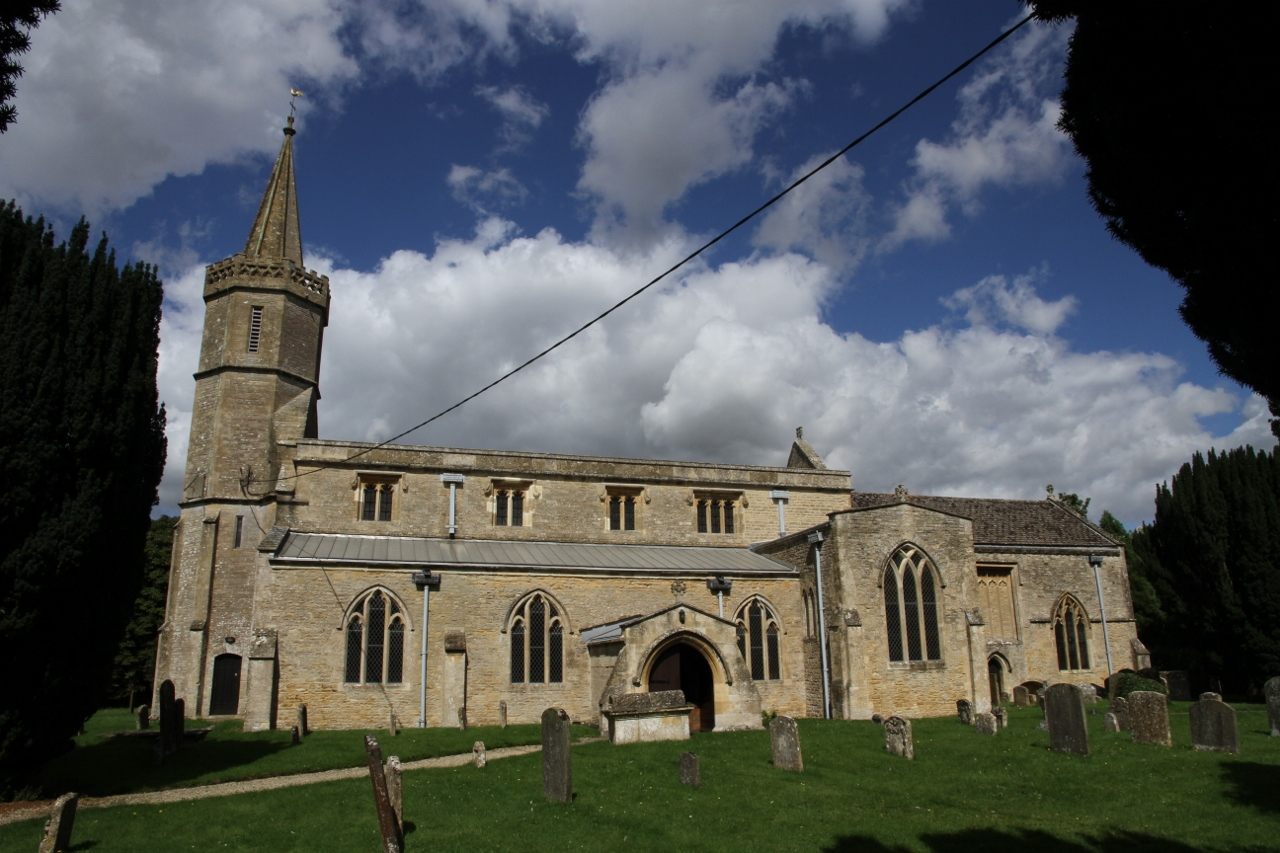
- St Giles' Church, Standlake
- 51°43′40″N 1°25′40″W
- OS grid reference: SP 39728 03624
- Location: Standlake, Witney, Oxfordshire, OX29 7SG
- Country: England
- Denomination: Church of England

History
- Dedication: Saint Giles

Architecture
- Style: Norman, Early English Gothic, Decorated Gothic and Perpendicular Gothic
- Years built: circa 1160-1500

Administration
- Province: Canterbury
- Diocese: Oxford
- Archdeaconry: Dorchester
- Deanery: Witney
- Parish: St Giles, Standlake

Clergy
- Vicar: Revd Hurst

The Parish Church of Saint Giles, Standlake is the Church of England parish church of Standlake, a village about 5 miles (8 km) southeast of Witney in Oxfordshire. Since 1976 St Giles' parish has been a member of the Lower Windrush Benefice along with the parishes of Northmoor, Stanton Harcourt and Yelford.

== History ==
The Church of England parish church of Saint Giles dates from the latter part of the 12th century, and the chancel arch, west wall of the nave and Norman font survive from this time. In the first half of the 13th century the chancel was rebuilt and north and south transepts were added, all in an Early English Gothic style. The north transept and east end of the chancel retain some lancet windows from this time. The north aisle is 14th century but the square bases of the columns of its arcade look 12th century, suggesting that it was rebuilt from an earlier north aisle that was either purely Norman or Transitional from Norman to Early English. The south aisle, however, is purely early 14th century, as are the Decorated Gothic windows in both aisles. In the middle of the 14th century the arcade between the nave and the north aisle was rebuilt with Decorated Gothic columns, new windows were inserted in the north walls of the chancel and the north transept, and an unusual slender octagonal bell tower with a small spire was added at the west end of the nave. In about 1500 a clerestory was added to the nave and Perpendicular Gothic windows were inserted on the south side of the chancel and at the west end of the south aisle.

== Restoration ==
In the 19th century the church building deteriorated until the Gothic Revival architect C.C. Rolfe restored it in phases from 1880 to 1891. Rolfe rediscovered and reopened 13th century windows in the chancel, north transept and at the west end of the north aisle and blocked the windows that had been added to the chancel in the 14th and 15th centuries. Rolfe rebuilt the porch, which was probably 14th century, reusing its original materials. Rolfe also re-roofed and refurnished the entire building, for which all the woodcarving was undertaken by Harry Hems of Exeter. The spire was restored in 1911. The roof developed structural defects in the 20th century and in the Second World War it was damaged by a bomb. It was repaired in about 1950 and the church was reroofed in the 1990s.

== Bells ==
The west tower has a ring of six bells. The second, third and fifth bells were cast in 1709 and 1710: the survivors of a ring of five cast by Henry III Bagley of Chacombe, Northamptonshire. William Taylor cast the tenor bell in 1843, presumably at his then bell-foundry in Oxford. Mears and Stainbank or the Whitechapel Bell Foundry cast the treble bell in 1887. The fourth bell was recast in 1931. St Giles' has also a Sanctus bell, which Thomas Rudhall of Gloucester cast in 1781.

== Sources ==
- Baggs, A.P.; Chance, Eleanor; Colvin, Christina; Day, C.J.; Selwyn, Nesta; Townley, Simon C. (1996). Crossley, Alan; Currie, C.R.J. (eds.). A History of the County of Oxford. Victoria County History. Vol. 13: Bampton Hundred (Part One). London: Oxford University Press for the Institute of Historical Research. pp. 197–203. ISBN 978-0-19722-790-9.
- Sherwood, Jennifer; Pevsner, Nikolaus (1974). Oxfordshire. The Buildings of England. Harmondsworth: Penguin Books. pp. 776–778. ISBN 0-14-071045-0.
