= Rousham House =

Country house at Rousham in Oxfordshire, England

Coordinates: 51°54′48″N 1°18′18″W

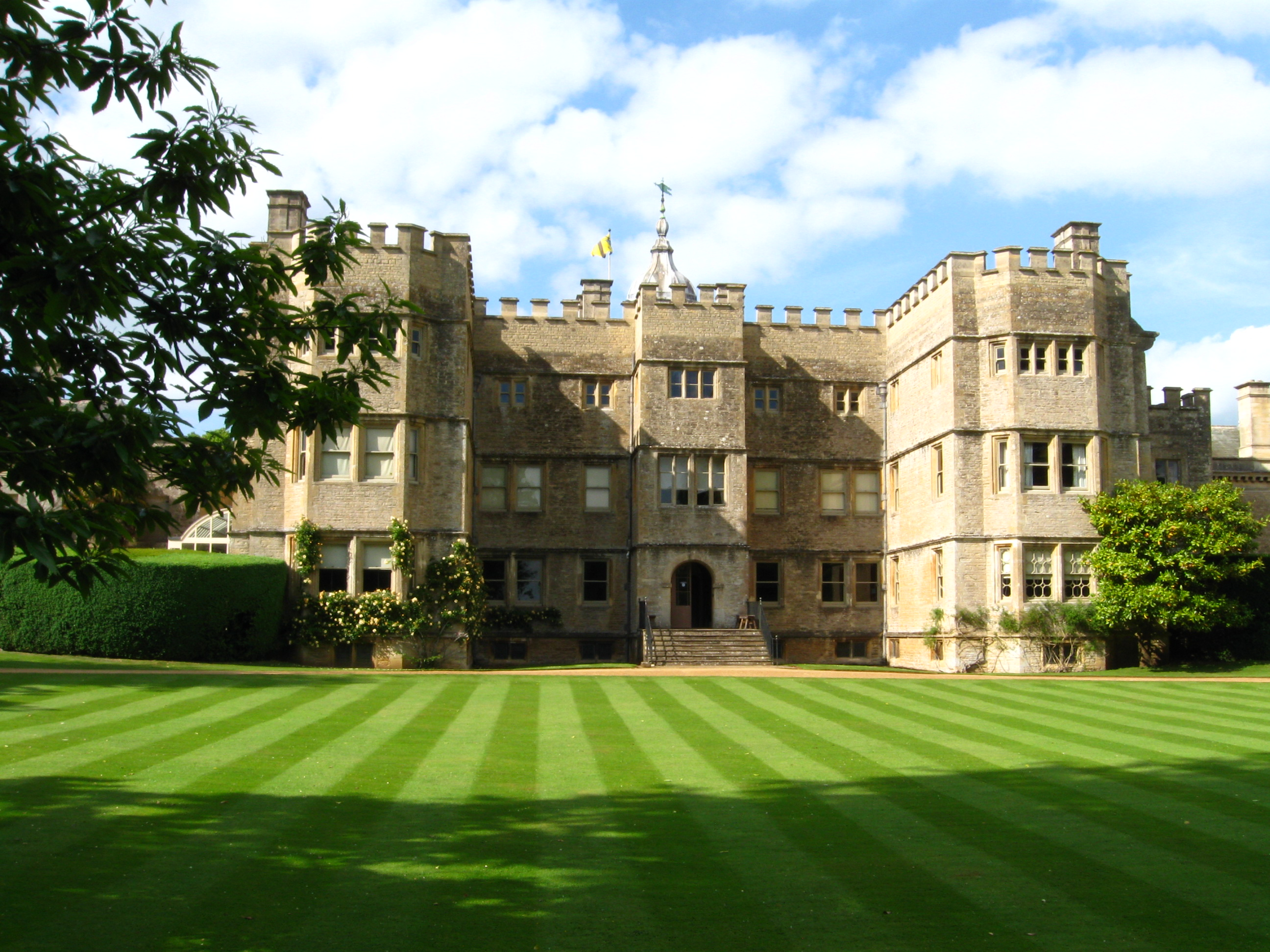
Rousham House

Rousham House (also known as Rousham Park) is a country house at Rousham in Oxfordshire, England. The house, which has been continuously in the ownership of one family, was built circa 1635 and remodelled by William Kent in the 18th century in a free Gothic style. Further alterations were carried out in the 19th century.

The gardens are open to the public every day; the house is open by appointment.

== History ==
In the 1630s Sir Robert Dormer bought the manor of Rousham. He immediately began construction of the present house but work was halted by the start of the English Civil War. The Dormers were a Royalist family and the house was attacked by Parliamentary soldiers.

In 1649 the estate was inherited by Robert Dormer's son, also Robert. He left the house much as his father had created it, only repairing the damage of the Civil War. However, he did more to restore the family fortunes by marrying twice, each time to an heiress. His second wife was the daughter of Sir Charles Cottrell, a high-ranking courtier of Charles II.

Colonel Robert Dormer-Cottrell, the grandson of the house's builder, inherited Rousham in 1719 and began the huge transformation of the gardens to its current appearance. Initially he employed Charles Bridgeman to lay out the gardens in the new and more naturalistic style that was becoming popular. Bridgeman's layout of the garden was completed circa 1737. Rousham was then inherited by the Colonel's brother, General James Dormer (1679–1741), who called in William Kent to further enhance and develop the garden that Bridgeman created. This Kent did with considerable success over the next four years.

On the death of James Dormer in 1741, unmarried and without issue, the estate passed to his first cousin Sir Clement Cottrell-Dormer(1686–1758) (the son of his aunt Anne Cottrell) who added the surname Dormer to his patronymic. At this time Kent also embellished the house itself, with crenellations and two wings containing a drawing room and a "delightful" library, according to Horace Walpole who said of Rousham in 1760 "it reinstated Kent with me; he has no where shewn so much taste". The interiors were altered a century later but the hall, the principal room of the house, has survived alteration by successive generations unchanged, and remains as completed in the 17th century. Kent's exterior work is today almost as built, but in 1876 the original octagonal paned glazing was replaced with innovative large sheets of plate glass, during a heavy-handed restoration of the house by the architect James Piers St Aubyn. The house contains fine collections of Jacobean and 18th-century furniture, paintings and statuary, all displayed in a domestic setting.

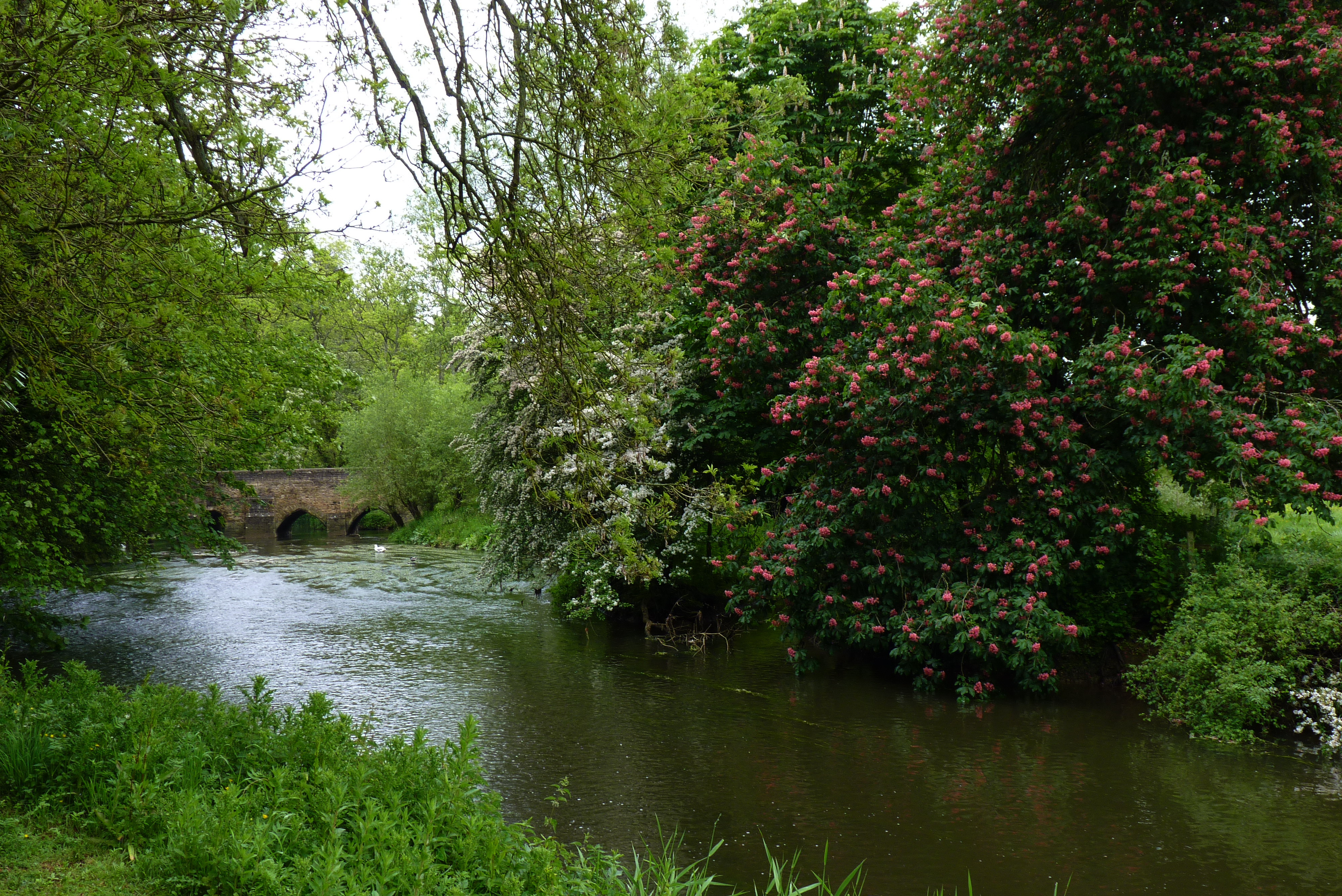
The river Cherwell

The gardens, created by Bridgeman and then Kent, overlook a curve of the River Cherwell. Bridgeman had laid out the garden, with meandering walks through the woods, and pools of varying degrees of formality. Kent's theme was to create and transform the naturalistic landscape created by Bridgeman by introducing 'Augustan' traits to recall the glories and atmosphere of ancient Rome. Thus the Roman Forum was to be recreated in the verdant English countryside. "The garden is Daphne in little", Walpole told George Montagu: "the sweetest little groves, streams, glades, porticoes, cascades, and river, imaginable; all the scenes are perfectly classic."

== The house and garden today ==
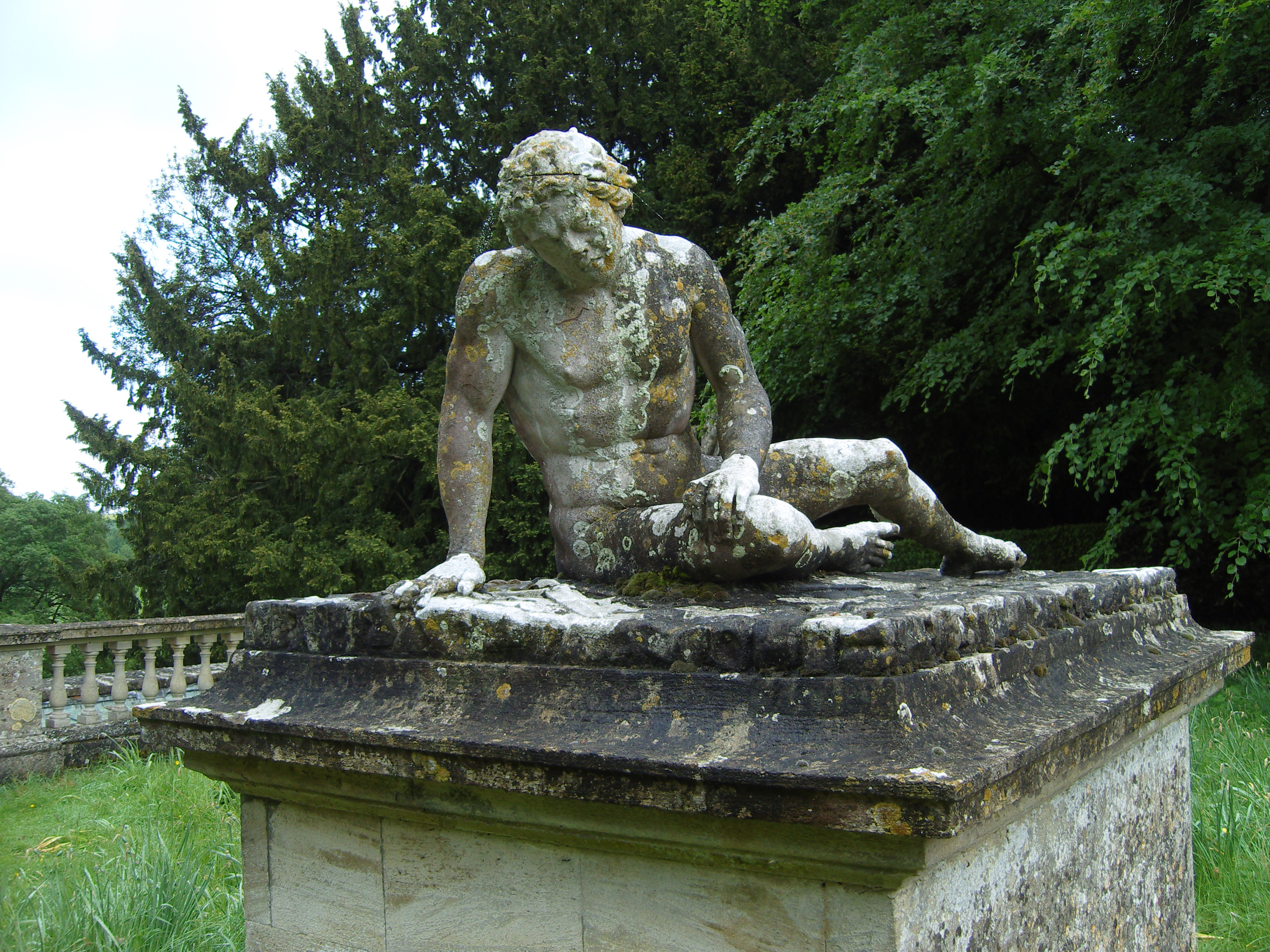
Statue based on the Dying Gaul (or Dying Gladiator) in Rome

Statue detail

Kent's garden extends past classical temples, follies and statuary representing dying gladiators, a horse being savaged by a lion and other themes. The paths leading through the woods, where the water from the Cherwell ends into larger ponds and formal pools, is followed with classical statuary of Roman gods and mythological creatures. As one progresses from the cascade to the cold bath and on to the next temple or arcade, you are greeted by a succession of picturesque tableaux. The statues are part of the work of the sculptor Peter Scheemakers.

Among the most revealing and thought-provoking of the follies is a grotto with a small cascade with the inscription: "In Front of this Stone lie the Remains of Ringwood an otter-hound of extraordinary Sagacity": this shows that while the English squire who created this garden attempted to achieve Arcadia, his interests and loves remained hunting and hounds.

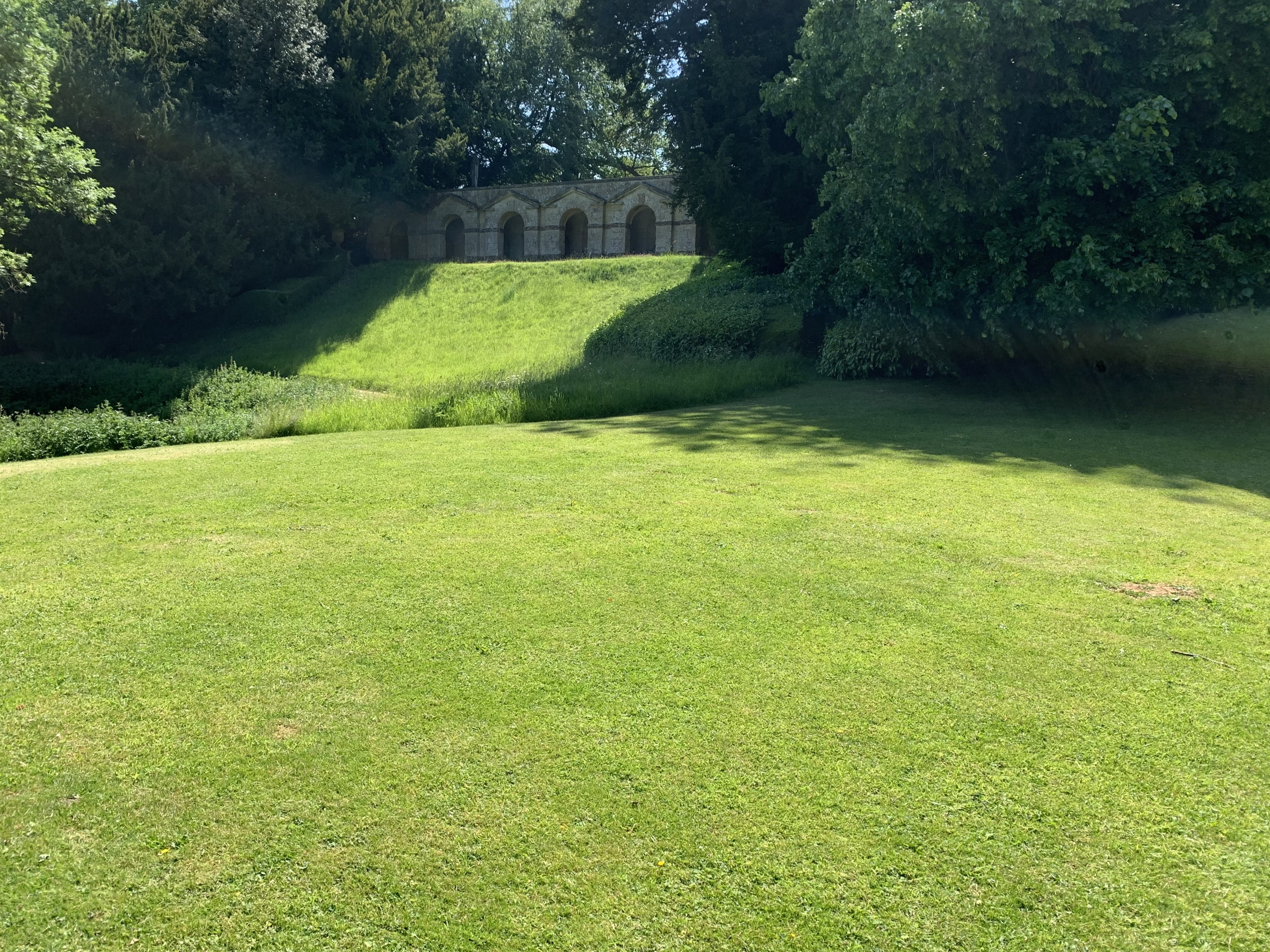
View of the Praeneste from the riverbank

The largest structure in the gardens is the Praeneste. Based on the Temple of Fortuna Primigenia in Palestrina, Italy, the Roman-style colonnade provides views across the Cherwell. A separate garden closer to the house evokes the spirit of the Tudor and Stuart eras of English gardening. Box-edged beds and borders of old roses and herbaceous plants are surrounded by walls of ancient red brick; here an historic circular dovecote still retains its doves and close by through a small gate is the parish church where generations of Cottrell-Dormers are buried. One memorial in the church commemorates three sons of the family killed in combat in the First World War.

The house and grounds have been used as filming locations for productions including ITV's Lewis (episode "The Dead of Winter") and BBC's 2021 miniseries The Pursuit of Love. English horticulturist Monty Don considers Rousham his favourite garden in England.

Rousham House is still the home of the Cottrell-Dormer family.

== Sources and further reading ==
- Batey, M. (1983). "Way to View Rousham, by Kent's Gardener". Garden History. XI (ii): 125–132. doi:10.2307/1586840. JSTOR 1586840.
- Fleming, J. (1963). "William Kent at Rousham: an 18th Century Elysium". Connoisseur. CLIII: 158.
- Crossley, Alan; A.P. Baggs; Christina Colvin; H.M. Colvin; Janet Cooper; C.J. Day; Nesta Selwyn; A. Tomkinson, eds. (1983). Victoria County History: A History of the County of Oxford, Volume 11: Wootton Hundred (northern part). pp. 159–168.
- Hussey, Christopher (1946). "A Georgian Arcady: William Kent's Gardens at Rousham, Oxfordshire". Country Life. XCIX: 1084, 1130.
- Hussey, Christopher (1967). "XVII: Rousham, Oxfordshire". English Gardens and Landscapes 1700–1750. London.
- Moggridge, Hal (1986). "Notes on Kent's garden at Rousham". Journal of Garden History. 6 (3): 187–226. doi:10.1080/01445170.1986.10405169.
- Pugh, S. (1973). "Nature as a Garden: A Conceptual Tour of Rousham". Studio International. CLXXXVI: 121.
- Woodbridge, K. (1974). "William Kent's Gardening: the Rousham Letters". Apollo. C: 282.
