= Burford =

Town in Oxfordshire, England

Coordinates: 51.808°N 1.637°W

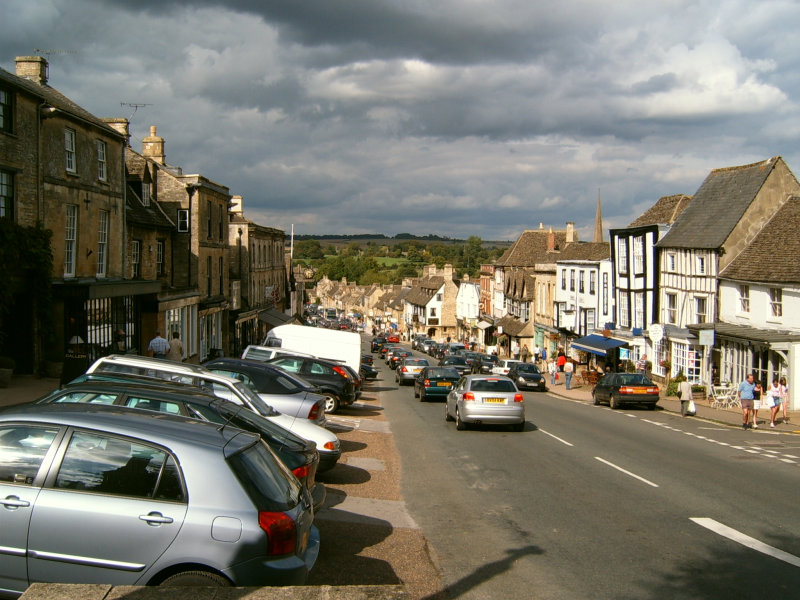
- Looking north along 'The Hill'

- Location within Oxfordshire
- Population: 1,422 (parish, 2011 Census)
- OS grid reference: SP2512
- Civil parish: Burford
- District: West Oxfordshire
- Shire county: Oxfordshire
- Region: South East
- Country: England
- Sovereign state: United Kingdom
- Post town: Burford
- Postcode district: OX18
- Dialling code: 01993
- Police: Thames Valley
- Fire: Oxfordshire
- Ambulance: South Central
- UK Parliament: Witney
- Website: Burford Town Council

Burford (/ˈbɜːrfərd/) is a town on the River Windrush, in the Cotswold hills, in the West Oxfordshire district of Oxfordshire, England. It is often referred to as the 'gateway' to the Cotswolds. Burford is located 18 miles (29 km) west of Oxford and 22 miles (35 km) southeast of Cheltenham, about 2 miles (3 km) from the Gloucestershire boundary. The toponym derives from the Old English words burh meaning fortified town or hilltown and ford, the crossing of a river. The 2011 Census recorded the population of Burford parish as 1,422.

== Economic and social history ==
The town began in the middle Saxon period with the founding of a village near the site of the modern priory building. This settlement continued in use until just after the Norman Conquest of England when the new town of Burford was built. On the site of the old village a hospital was founded which remained open until the Dissolution of the Monasteries by King Henry VIII. The modern priory building was constructed some 40 years later, in around 1580.

The town centre's most notable building is the Church of St John the Baptist, a Church of England parish church, which is a Grade I listed building. Described by David Verey as "a complicated building which has developed in a curious way from the Norman", it is known for its merchants' guild chapel, memorial to Henry VIII's barber-surgeon, Edmund Harman, featuring South American Indians and Kempe stained glass. In 1649 the church was used as a prison during the Civil War, when the New Model Army Banbury mutineers were held there. Some of the 340 prisoners left carvings and graffiti, which still survive in the church.

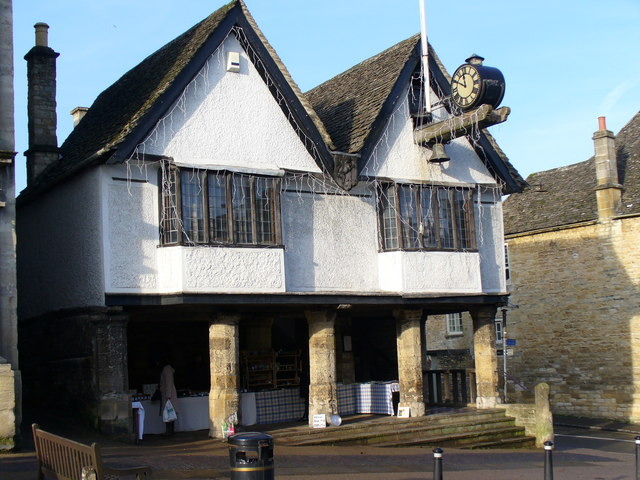
The Tolsey

The town centre also has some 15th-century houses and the baroque-style townhouse that is now Burford Methodist Church. Between the 14th and 17th centuries Burford was important for its wool trade. The Tolsey, midway along Burford's High Street, which was once the focal point for trade, is now a museum. The authors of Burford: Buildings and People in a Cotswold Town (2008) argue that Burford should be seen as less a medieval town than an Arts and Crafts town. A 2020 article in Country Life magazine summarized the community's recent history:

"Burford, similarly, had bustled during the coaching era, but coaching inns such as Ramping Cat and the Bull were diminished or closed when the railways came. Agriculture remained old-fashioned, if not Biblical, and was badly affected by the long agricultural depression that started in the 1870s. The local dialect was so thick that, in the 1890s, Gibbs had to publish a glossary to explain George Ridler’s Oven, one of the folk songs he collected. In the late 19th century, the Cotswolds assumed a Sleeping Beauty charm, akin to that of Burne-Jones’s Legend of the Briar Rose at Buscot Park in the Thames Valley."

=== Priory ===
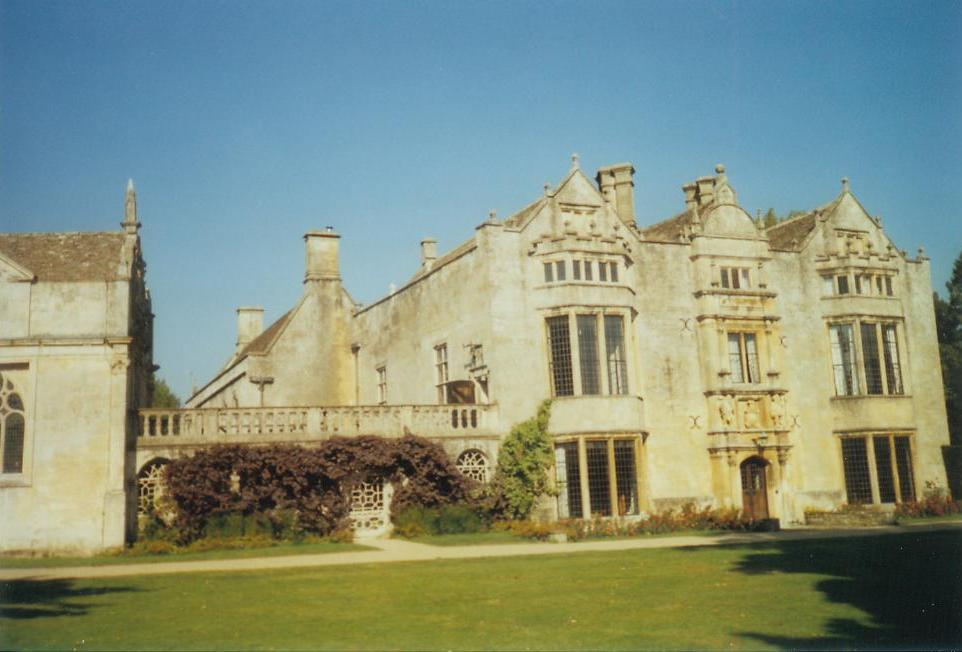
Burford Priory

Burford Priory is a country house that stands on the site of a 13th-century Augustinian priory hospital. In the 1580s an Elizabethan house was built incorporating remnants of the building. It was remodelled in Jacobean style, probably after 1637, by which time the estate had been bought by William Lenthall, Speaker of the House of Commons in the Long Parliament. After 1912 the house and later the chapel were restored for the philanthropist Emslie John Horniman, MP, by the architect Walter Godfrey. From 1949 Burford Priory housed the Society of the Salutation of Mary the Virgin, a community of Church of England nuns. In 1987, in declining numbers, it became a mixed community including Church of England Benedictine monks. In 2008 the community relocated and sold the property which is now a private dwelling. A Time Team excavation of the Priory in 2010 found pottery sherds from the 12th or 13th century.

=== English Civil Wars – the Banbury mutiny ===
On 17 May 1649, three soldiers who were Levellers were executed on the orders of Oliver Cromwell in the churchyard at Burford following a mutiny started over pay and the prospect of being sent to fight in Ireland. Corporal Church, Private Perkins, and Cornet Thompson were the key leaders of the mutiny and, after a brief court-martial, were put up against the wall in the churchyard at Burford and shot. The remaining soldiers were pardoned. Each year on the nearest weekend to the Banbury mutiny is commemorated as 'Levellers Day'.

=== Bell foundry ===
Burford has twice had a bell foundry: one run by the Neale family in the 17th century and another run by the Bond family in the 19th and 20th centuries. Henry Neale was a bell founder between 1627 and 1641 and also had a foundry at Somerford Keynes in Gloucestershire. Edward Neale had joined him as a bell-founder at Burford by 1635 and continued the business until 1685. Numerous Neale bells remain in use, including at St Britius, Brize Norton, St Mary's, Buscot, and St James the Great, Fulbrook. A few Neale bells that are no longer rung are displayed in Burford parish church. Henry Bond had a bell foundry at Westcot from 1851 to 1861. He then moved it to Burford where he continued until 1905. He was then succeeded by Thomas Bond, who continued bell-founding at Burford until 1947. Bond bells still in use include four of the ring of six at St John the Evangelist, Taynton, one and a Sanctus bell at St Nicholas, Chadlington and one each at St Mary the Virgin, Chalgrove and St Peter's, Whatcote in Warwickshire.

=== Easter Synod ===
For many years before the 7th century there had been strife between the Celtic Church and the Early Church over the question of when Easter Day should be celebrated. The Britons adhered to the rule laid at the Council of Arles in 314, that Easter Day should be the 14th day of the Paschal moon, even if the moon were on a Sunday. The Roman Church had decided that when the 14th day of the Paschal moon was a Sunday, Easter Day should be the Sunday after. Various Synods were held in different parts of the kingdom with the object of settling this controversy, and one was held for this object at Burford in 685. Monk deduces from the fact of the Synod being held at Burford, that the Britons in some numbers had settled in the town and neighbourhood. This Synod was attended by Æthelred, King of Mercia, and his nephew Berthwald (who had been granted the southern part of his uncle's kingdom); Theodore, Archbishop of Canterbury; Bosel, Bishop of Worcester; Seaxwulf, Bishop of Lichfield; Aldhelm, Abbot of Malmesbury; and many others. Aldhelm was ordered at this conference to write a book against the error of the Britons in the observance of Easter. At this Synod Berthwald gave 40 cassates of land (a cassate is enough land to support a family) to Aldhelm who afterwards became Bishop of Shereborne. According to Spelman, the notes of the Synod were published in 705.

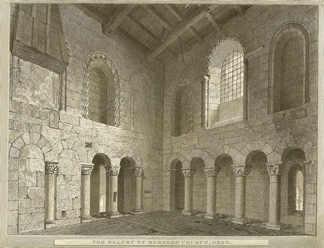
Belfry of St John the Baptist parish church in 1825

=== Battle of Burford and the Golden Dragon ===
Malmesbury and other chroniclers record a battle between the West Saxons and Mercians at Burford in 752. In the end Æthelhum, the Mercian standard-bearer who carried the flag with a golden dragon on it, was killed by the lance of his Saxon rival. The Anglo-Saxon Chronicle records "A.D 752. This year Cuthred, king of the West Saxons, in the 12th year of his reign, fought at Burford, against Æthelbald king of the Mercians, and put him to flight." The historian William Camden (1551–1623) wrote

"... in Saxon Beorgford [i.e. Burford], where Cuthred, king of the West Saxons, then tributary to the Mercians, not being able to endure any longer the cruelty and base exactions of King Æthelbald, met him in the open field with an army and beat him, taking his standard, which was a portraiture of a golden dragon."

The origin of the golden dragon standard is attributed to that of Uther Pendragon, the father of King Arthur of whom Geoffrey of Monmouth wrote:

[Uther Pendragon] "... ordered two dragons to be fashioned in gold, in the likeness of the one which he had seen in the ray which shone from that star. As soon as the Dragons had been completed this with the most marvellous craftsmanship – he made a present of one of them to the congregation of the cathedral church of the see of Winchester. The second one he kept for himself, so that he could carry it around to his wars."

In the late 16th or early 17th century the people of Burford still celebrated the anniversary of the battle. Camden wrote: "There has been a custom in the town of making a great dragon yearly, and carrying it up and down the streets in great jollity on St John's Eve". The field traditionally claimed to be that of the battle is still called Battle Edge. According to Reverend Francis Knollis' description of the discovery, "On 21 November 1814 a large freestone sarcophagus was discovered near Battle Edge 3 feet (0.91 m) below ground, weighing 16 long hundredweight (1,800 lb; 810 kg) with the feet pointing almost due south. The interior is 6 feet (1.8 m) long and 2 feet 2 inches (0.66 m) wide. It was found to contain the remains of a human body, with portions of a leather cuirass studded with metal nails. The skeleton was found in near perfect state due to the exclusion of air from the sarcophagus." The coffin is now preserved in Burford churchyard, near the west gate.

"Whose fame is in that dark green tomb? Four stones with their heads of moss stand there. They mark the narrow house of death. Some chief of fame is here! Raise the songs of old! Awake their memory in the tomb." – Ossian

== Amenities ==
Burford County Primary School is the town's primary school. Burford School, a mixed comprehensive school, is the town's secondary school. The primary school fête, held every summer, includes a procession (including a dragon) down High Street to the school, where there are stalls and games. The Blue Cross National Animal Welfare Charity is based at Burford. In September 2001 Burford was twinned with Potenza Picena, a small town in the Marche, on the Adriatic coast of Italy. In April 2009 Burford was ranked sixth in Forbes magazine's list of "Europe's Most Idyllic Places To Live".

== Media ==
Local news and television programmes are provided by BBC South and ITV Meridian. Television signals are received from the Oxford TV transmitter. Local radio stations are BBC Radio Oxford, Heart South, Greatest Hits Radio South (formerly Jack FM) and Witney Radio, a community-based station which broadcast from Witney. The town's local newspapers are the Oxfordshire Guardian and Witney Gazette. The Bridge Magazine is a local community magazine produced by and for the people of Burford and surrounding villages in West Oxfordshire.

== Local legend and literature ==
Local legend tells of a fiery coach containing the judge and local landowner Sir Lawrence Tanfield of Burford Priory and his wife flying around the town that brings a curse upon all who see it. Ross Andrews speculates that the apparition may have been caused by a local tradition of burning effigies of the unpopular couple that began after their deaths. In real life Tanfield and his second wife Elizabeth Evans are known to have been notoriously harsh to their tenants. The visitations were reportedly ended when local clergymen trapped Lady Tanfield's ghost in a corked glass bottle during an exorcism and cast it into the River Windrush. During droughts locals would fill the river from buckets to ensure that the bottle did not rise above the surface and free the spirit. Burford is the main setting for The Wool-Pack, a historical novel for children by Cynthia Harnett. The author J. Meade Falkner, best known for the novel Moonfleet, is buried in the churchyard of St John the Baptist.

== Notable people ==
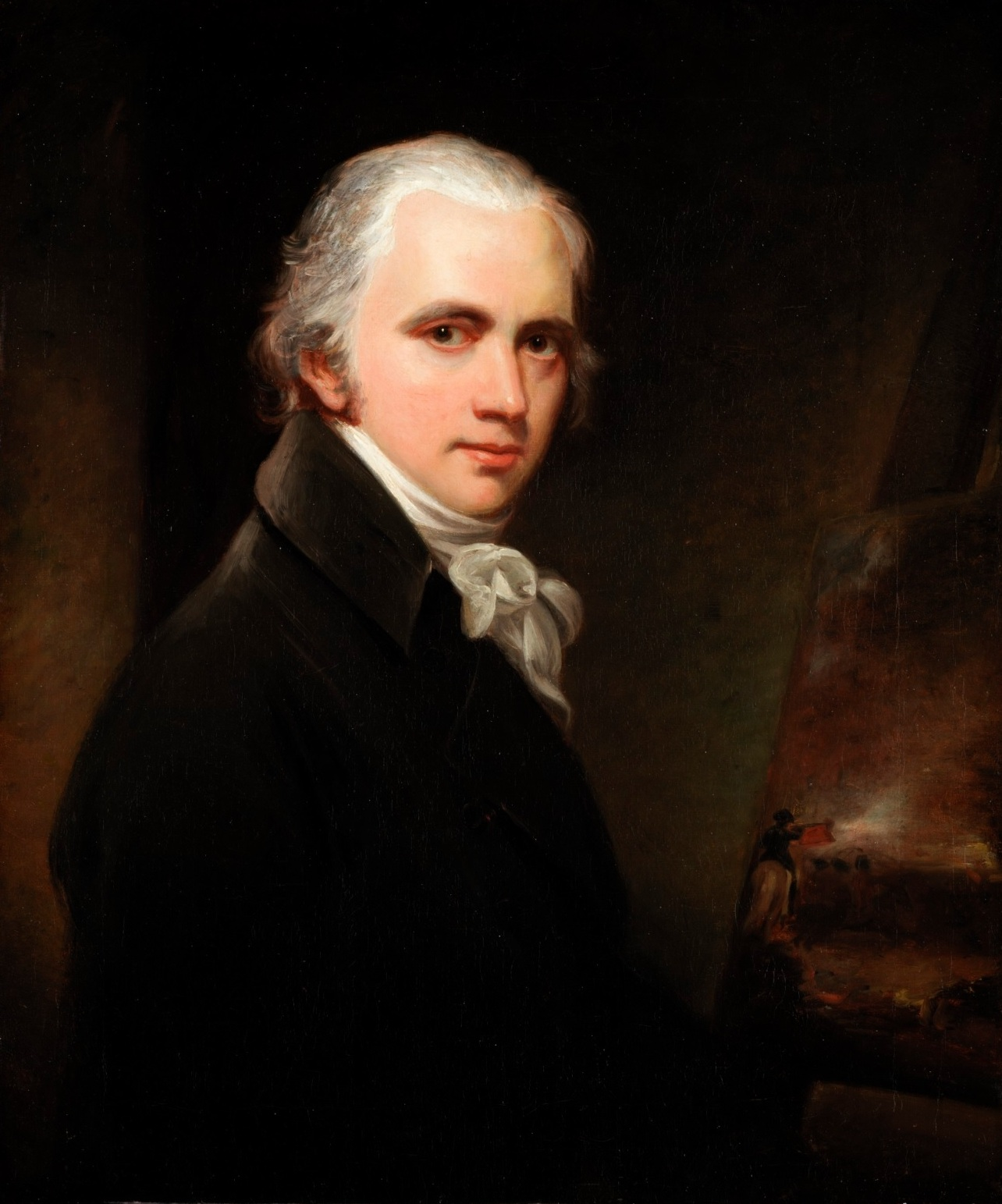
Sir William Beechey, self-portrait, ca.1800

- Elizabeth Cary, Viscountess Falkland (1585–1639), poet, dramatist and historian
- William Lenthall (1591–1662 in Burford), politician, Speaker of the House of Commons in the Civil War period
- Peter Heylyn (1599–1662), ecclesiastic and author of polemical, historical, political and theological tracts
- Lucius Cary, 2nd Viscount Falkland (ca.1610–1643), author and politician
- Marchamont Nedham (1620–1678), journalist, publisher and pamphleteer during the English Civil War
- Christopher Kempster (1627–1715), master stonemason and architect
- William Beechey (1753–1839), portrait painter
- Charles Henry Newmarch (1824–1903), cleric and author
- Katharine Mary Briggs (1898–1980), folklorist and writer, lived in Burford
- Edward Mortimer (1943–2021), UN civil servant, journalist, author and academic

== In popular culture ==
- Burford was referred to as Beorgford in The Saxon Stories by Bernard Cornwell.
- The Dirty Business TV series is located in Burford

== See also ==
- Oxford Blue – a cheese made in Burford

== Sources ==
- Gardner, Robert (1852). "Burford Town and Parish". Directory of Oxfordshire. pp. 497–498. Archived from the original on 4 March 2016.
- Geoffrey of Monmouth (1966) [circa 1136]. The History of the Kings of Britain. Harmondsworth: Penguin Books. p. 202. translated by Lewis Thorpe.
- Monk, William John (1891). The History of Burford. Burford & London: C.W. Swatman; Simpkin, Marshall, Hamilton, Kent & Co. Ltd.
- Sherwood, Jennifer; Pevsner, Nikolaus (1974). Oxfordshire. The Buildings of England. Harmondsworth: Penguin Books. pp. 501–522. ISBN 0-14-071045-0.
