= John Fettiplace (politician died 1580) =

Member of the Parliament of England

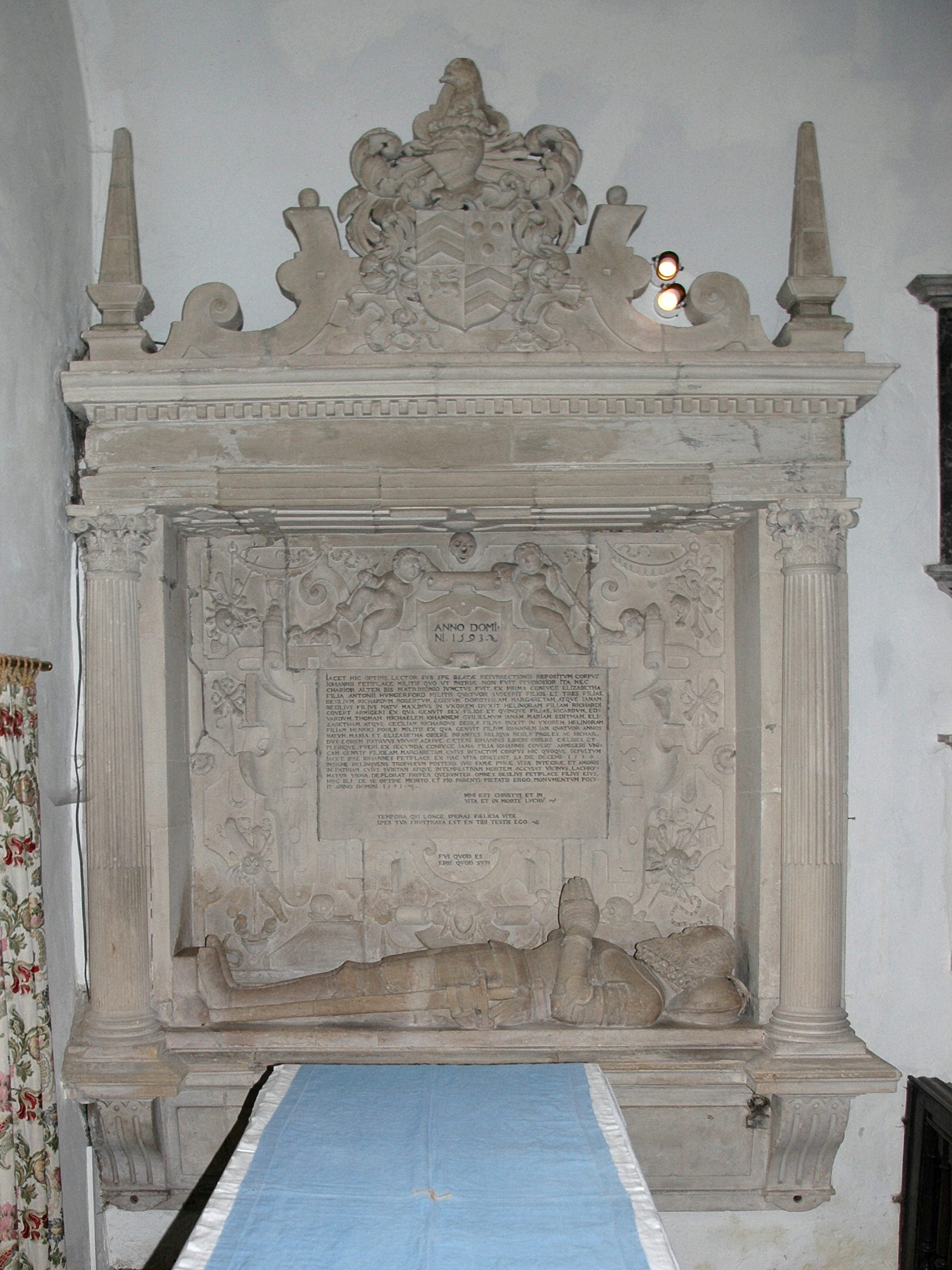
Mural monument with recumbent effigy of John Fettiplace (erected in 1593) in St Laurence's Church, Appleton, Oxfordshire. Showing the arms of Fettiplace: Gules, two chevrons argent quartering Three bezants (possibly canting arms of Besil) and Gules, a lion statant guardant argent crowned or (Lisle of Kingston Lisle, Sparsholt, Berkshire)

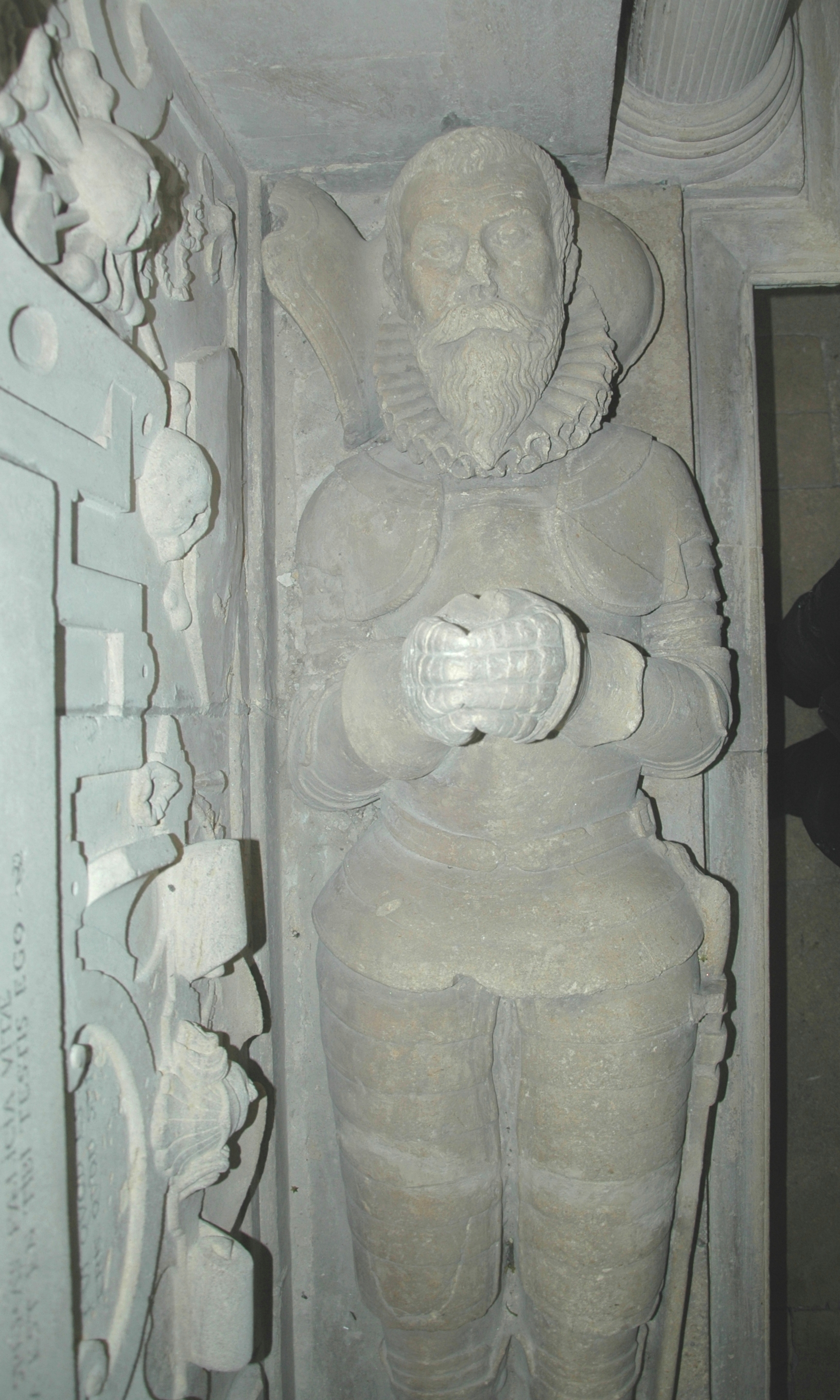

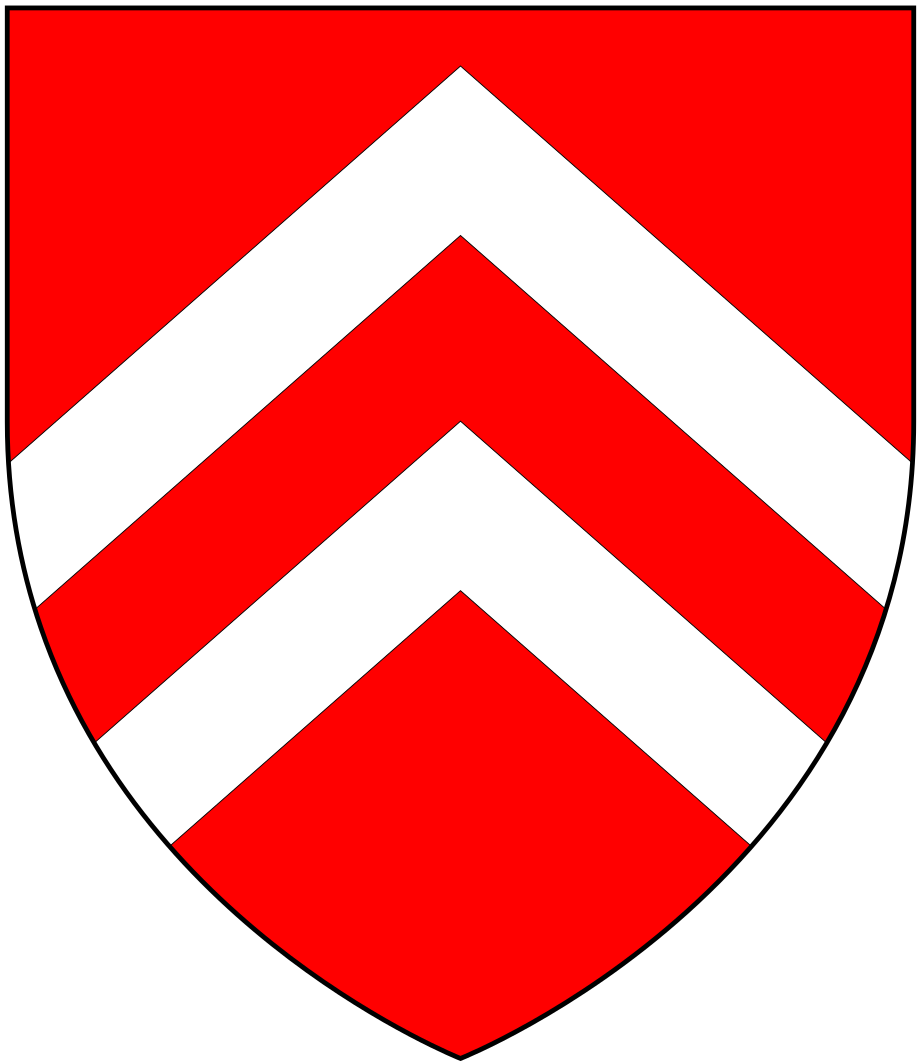
Arms of Fettiplace: Gules, two chevrons argent

John Fettiplace (1527 – 28 December 1580) of Besils-Leigh (modern: Besselsleigh) in Berkshire (now Oxfordshire), was a member of the landed gentry and of the prominent Fettiplace family who served as a Member of Parliament for Berkshire in 1558 and twice served as Sheriff of Berkshire, in 1568 and 1577.

== Origins ==
He was the eldest son and heir of Edmund Fettiplace (c. 1505–1540) of Besils-Leigh by his wife Margaret Mordaunt, a daughter of John Mordaunt, 1st Baron Mordaunt. A monumental brass with effigies of Edmund and his wife Margaret survive in Marcham Church, Berkshire. His younger brother was George Fettiplace (1531/2–1577), MP.

=== Early origins ===
Richard Fettiplace (c. 1456–1511) married Elizabeth Besil, only daughter and heiress of William Besil of Besils-Leigh in Berkshire, which he made his chief seat. Richard was buried in the chancel of Poughley Priory Church, near Great Shefford in Berkshire, and bequeathed property to that church and a 99-year lease lands to a chantry chapel within the parish church of East Shifford "to keep an obiit there for my soul and to yearly keep in order the said parish church and to maintain lights there".

In January 1527, Edward Fetyplace, Treasurer to the Charles Brandon, 1st Duke of Suffolk, wrote to Thomas Cromwell, upbraiding him with breaking his word as to granting him the site of the dissolved Poughley Priory, on the faith of which he had given Cromwell 40 shillings at the time of its dissolution, but the lease had been granted to another man. Fetyplace complains that he had bought of Cromwell certain implements belonging to the Priory, of which he left there the well bucket and rope, and a brass pan set in the wall to brew with, which said implements the scholars of the Cardinal's College 'have perused and worn in the time of their lying there,' but the bursar refuses to pay for them. In February 1529, Edward Fetyplace wrote again to Cromwell desiring his interest that he might be assured of more years in the farm of Poughley. From this letter it is evident that Cromwell had been recently visiting the dismantled priory, as Fetyplace records a visit to Poughley, on 'the Thursday after our departing,' of one John Edden who came with a cart to carry off such stuff as was appointed to go to Wolsey's College at Oxford; the bedding was in Fetyplace's chamber, which was locked, but Edden 'with great oaths and with levers brak up the doors.'

In 1564 he was lessee of The Abbey, Sutton Courtenay.

The great-grandson of Richard Fettiplace (d. 1511) and Elizabeth Besil was Besil Fettiplace, Sheriff of Berkshire in 1583. John Fettiplace of Chilbrey in Berkshire was created a baronet in 1661.

The Bessiles family had been settled at Besils-Leigh in Berkshire since the reign of King Edward I, but originated in Provence in France and were "men of activitye in feates of arms as it appearith in monuments at Legh; how he faught in listes with a straunge knyghte that challengyd hym, at the whitche deade the kynge and quene at that time of England were present".

== Marriages and children ==
He married twice:

- Firstly to Elizabeth Hungerford, a daughter of Sir Anthony Hungerford, MP, of Down Ampney in Gloucestershire;
- Secondly to Jane Covert, a daughter of John Covert, MP, of Slaugham in Sussex and widow of Sir Francis Fleming, MP, by whom he had two sons and two daughters, including:
  - Bessels Fettiplace, eldest son, whose daughter-in-law, Elinor Fettiplace, in 1604 wrote what is now known as Elinor Fettiplace's Receipt Book, a rare manuscript on the subjects of household management and cooking, which became well known in later centuries.
  - Richard Fettiplace;
  - Margaret Fettiplace.

== Death and burial ==
He died in 1580 and was buried in Appleton Church in Oxfordshire, where survives his fine mural monument with recumbent effigy.

Parliament of England
Preceded by Sir Francis Englefield; William Hyde	Member of Parliament for Berkshire; 1558; With: Sir Francis Englefield	Succeeded by Sir William Fitzwilliam; Henry Neville
