= John Fettiplace =

John Fettiplace may refer to:

- John Fettiplace (politician died 1580) (1527–1580), English MP from Appleton in Berkshire (now Oxfordshire)
- John Fettiplace (politician died 1658) (1583–1658), English MP and royalist from Swinbrook in Oxfordshire
- Sir John Fettiplace, 1st Baronet (died 1672), High Sheriff of Berkshire
