= Fettiplace =

Family name

Fettiplace is an English family name, allegedly of Norman descent, originating with a landed gentry family chiefly of Berkshire and Oxfordshire, from which came a baronetical line, extinct.

== English family ==
The first recorded member of the Fettiplace family was Adam Feteplace or Fettiplace, Mayor of Oxford for eleven terms between 1245 and 1268. His family lived at North Denchworth in Berkshire (now Oxfordshire). Adam Fettiplace was one of seven townsmen imprisoned in 1232 for injuring clerks of the University in a town and gown incident. Adam Fettiplace owned Drapery Hall in Cornmarket Street, and probably lived there, as he had his own stall in St Martin's Church at Carfax, Oxford. He also owned Shelde Hall in the parish of St Peter-in-the-East, and in 1253 he heads a list of the names of the "maiorum burgensium Oxonie". His wife was the widow of Peter fitz Geoffrey and their eldest son was Philip Fettiplace. They also had a son called Walter Fettiplace. Adam Fettiplace was first elected Mayor of Oxford for 1245/6, the first of eleven times between then and 1267/8. In 1265 Simon de Montfort the Younger marched through Oxford on his way to Kenilworth Castle, and was accused of imprisoning Adam Fettiplace until he granted his (de Montfort's) tailor ten marks' rent in Oxford. On 22 August 1265 letters patent were issued of protection to Adam Fettiplace until Michaelmas.

Sir Philip Fettiplace, son of Adam Fettiplace, was knight of the shire for Berkshire in 1302. Sir Philip bore for his arms: on a field (gules) two chevrons (argent), quartering the coat of the Lord St. Amand, as is evident from a seal used by him with his name around it, in the time of Edward I.

An increase in their status occurred with the marriage of Sir Thomas Fettiplace (d. 1442), of East Shefford, Berkshire (the exact nature of whose descent from Adam Fettiplace has not been established) and a Portuguese noblewoman named Beatrix (d. Christmas Day 1447), the young widow of Gilbert, 5th Lord Talbot. Their tomb is in the parish church.

Their three sons were William, of Stokenchurch, Oxfordshire, James, of Maidencourt, Berkshire, and John. John Fettiplace was a London draper, who became a member of the household of Henry VI and carried the insignia of the Order of the Garter to the King of Portugal. He possessed the manors of East Shefford and of New Langport, Kent.

John Fettiplace (d. August 1464) of East Shefford married Joan Fabian, widow of Robert Horne of London. They had four sons- Richard, Anthony, Thomas, and William, and a daughter, Margaret. From Richard and Anthony descend all branches of the landed Fettiplace family aside from the original family of North Denchworth; all of these branches were extinct by 1806.

- Richard Fettiplace (died 1511), of East Shefford and Besselsleigh, Berks., married Elizabeth, daughter and heir of William Bessels of Besselsleigh, Berkshire, by his wife Alice, daughter of Sir Richard Harcourt. Richard Fettiplace and his wife, Elizabeth, had five sons and four daughters. The East Shefford estate remained in the family for five generations, then sold on the extinction of this line; a branch of this family were the Fettiplaces of Fernham, Berkshire, also extinct by 1720. One of its members was the politician John Fettiplace.
- Anthony Fettiplace (died 1510), of Swinbrook, Oxfordshire and Childrey, Berkshire, was Esquire of the Body to Henry VII, and Sheriff of Berkshire in 1497. His wife, Mary, was sister of Sir Adrian Fortescue and granddaughter of Sir Geoffrey Boleyn, Lord Mayor of London. Anthony Fettiplace's descendants included the baronetical line established with John Fettiplace, extinct in 1743. Anthony's grandson William was founder of the cadet branch of Swyncombe, Oxfordshire, extinct at the death of Francis Englefield Fettiplace.
- Thomas Fettiplace, of Compton Beauchamp, Berkshire, a knight, accompanied the King to the Field of the Cloth of Gold to meet the French King, Francis I in 1520. His only issue was a daughter, who married the courtier Sir Francis Englefield.
- William Fettiplace, of Letcombe, Berkshire, married Elizabeth Waring, widow of John Kentwood, but had no issue.

The main Fettiplace family of North Denchworth, from which all the above branches descend, was extinct in the male line at the death of Thomas Fettiplace of Denchworth, Pusey, Oxfordshire and Charney Bassett in the reign of King James I; Thomas's sister and heiress, Margaret, married Christopher, a younger son of Alexander Fettiplace of Swinbrook and Childrey (descended from Anthony Fettiplace of Swinbrook and Childrey, as above), and the North Denchworth estate was sold in around 1809 to a farmer named Frogley.

The Fettiplace name passed twice in the female line descended from Anthony Fettiplace, and was extinct even in that regard in 1806 on the death of Richard Gorges Fettiplace.

== Manors ==
The original seat of the Fettiplace family was the manor of North Denchworth (formerly in Oxfordshire, now part of Berkshire). Ralph de Camoys sold it in 1262 or 1263 to Adam Fettiplace of Oxford. Philip Fettiplace, Adam's son and successor, received a release from John de Camoys in 1291 and settled North Denchworth on the heirs of his son Aimery in 1300. A further settlement was made by Aimery on himself and his wife, Joan, in 1316.

His grandson Thomas appears to have ultimately succeeded, followed by his son Henry, who died in possession of North Denchworth in 1411, and then by his grandson John. John's heir was his nephew Peter, who died in 1494, and was succeeded by his son John, then John's son Philip, who died in 1546, and finally Philip's son Anthony, who survived his father by only a few weeks.

The manor then descended to Anthony's minor son, Edward, and upon Edward's death in 1597, to his son Thomas, who died without issue. In accordance with a settlement, the manor passed to Thomas' sister, Margaret, widow of Christopher Fettiplace of Letcombe Regis. Her son, Edmund, sold it in 1629 to John Fettiplace of Swinbrook and Childrey, and it subsequently followed the descent of the manor of Rampayns in Childrey within his family. The last of this line, Richard Gorges Fettiplace, left the manor by will to his brother-in-law, Captain Dacre.

The manor-house at East Shefford, known as Hug Ditch Court, probably passed to the Fettiplace family before the middle of the 15th century. Sir Thomas Fettiplace of East Shefford was buried in the church here about 1447. Sir Thomas left three sons, William, James and John. The eldest son, William, who was of Stokenchurch, held some land in Shefford. William had an only daughter Anne. James inherited the neighbouring manor of Maidencourt. John Fettiplace was a citizen and draper of London and a member of the household of King Henry VI, by whom he was employed to carry a garter to the King of Portugal. He inherited the East Shefford manor, and on his death in 1464 he bequeathed it to his eldest son Richard.

== American branch ==
Philip Phettiplace of the Hampshire branch of the Fettiplace family, who settled at Portsmouth, Rhode Island by 1671, was great-grandson of Walter Fettiplace (also 'Phetteplace', which came to be commonly used by this branch), of Southampton, an eighth-generation descendant of Adam Fettiplace, of North Denchworth, Mayor of Oxford. Walter Fettiplace was Mayor of Southampton in 1463, and M.P. for the borough in 1472.

The Phettiplace coat of arms for the Hampshire branch was differenced from the other lines by adding two gold scallop shells to the red shield with two silver chevrons.

There is a record of two Fettiplace brothers, William and Michael, arriving in Jamestown in 1607 with John Smith. William and Michael were descended from Richard Fettiplace of East Shefford.

== Elinor Fettiplace's Receipt Book ==
Elinor Fettiplace (née Poole, c. 1570 – c. 1647), wife of Sir Richard Fettiplace, of Appleton Manor, Berkshire (now Oxfordshire), wrote a Book of Receipts in 1604. It was first published in 1986, the manuscript having been inherited by the husband of the editor, Hilary Spurling. The compilation gives an intimate view of Elizabethan era cookery and domestic life in an aristocratic country household.

== Memorials ==
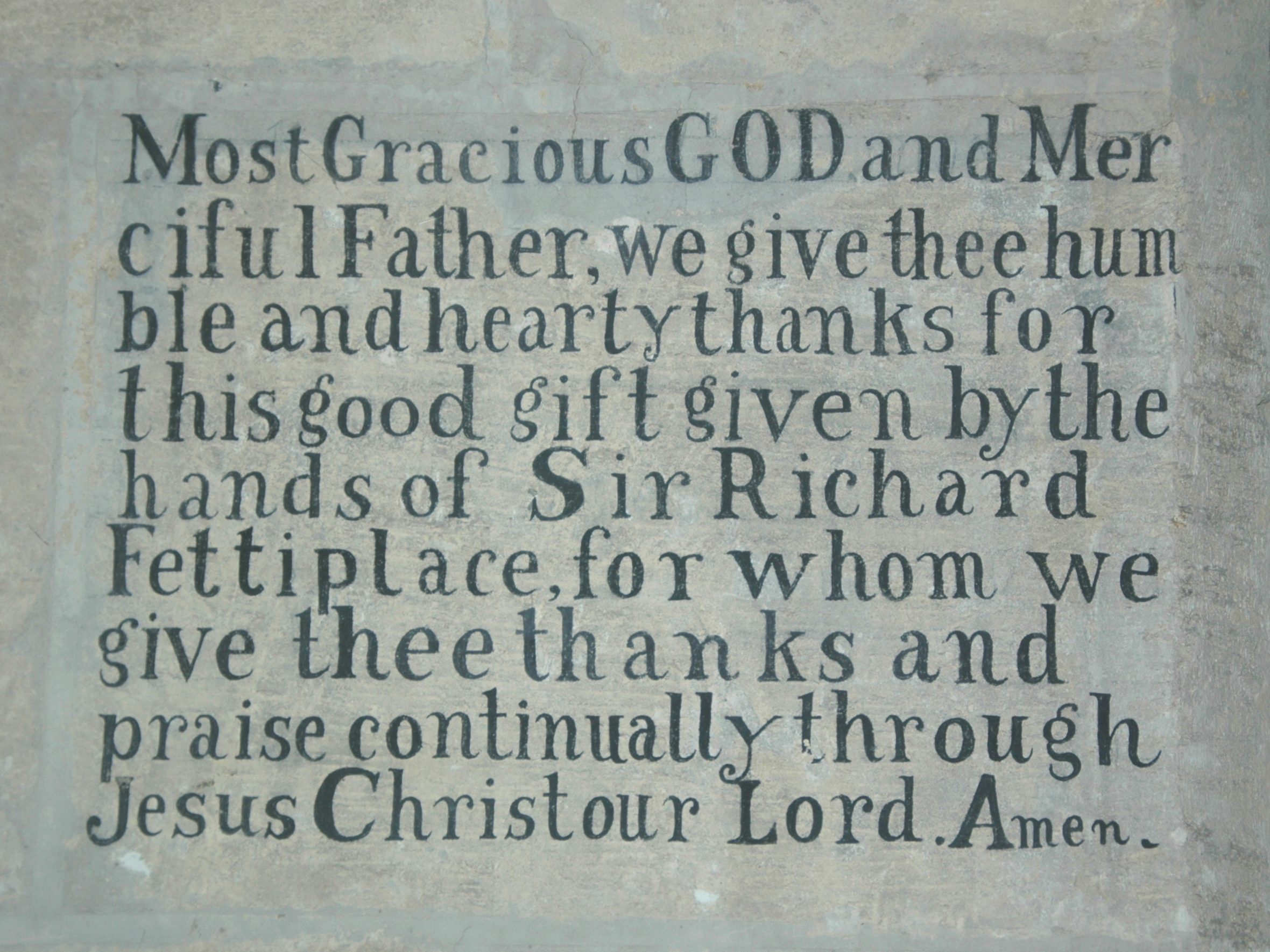
Inscription recording thanks to Sir Richard Fettiplace, Appleton church

The two triple family monuments at Swinbrook Church in Oxfordshire, with sets of effigies ranged on shelves above each other, are fine examples of English Renaissance and Baroque funerary art. There is a monument to John Fettiplace and an inscription thanking Richard Fettiplace at the parish church of St Laurence, Appleton, Oxfordshire.

Two Fettiplace monuments survive in St Thomas' Church, East Shefford. One is a mid-15th century altar tomb made of alabaster, featuring recumbent effigies of Sir Thomas Fettiplace and his Portuguese wife Beatrix. The second is a memorial brass for John Fettiplace (d. 1524) and his wife Dorothy Danvers, featuring family coats of arms, including those of Fettiplace impaling Danvers, and representations of a number of children.

== See also ==
- Robert Fettiplace, British neuroscientist
