= John Fettiplace (politician died 1658) =

English politician

John Fettiplace (1583–1658) was an English politician who sat in the House of Commons at various times between 1626 and 1644. He supported the Royalist cause in the English Civil War.

Fettiplace was the son of Sir Edmund Fettiplace of Childrey in Berkshire (now Oxfordshire) and Swinbrook in Oxfordshire and his wife, Anne, daughter of Richard Alford of Hitcham in Buckinghamshire. His father was 3rd cousin to John Fettiplace who was the MP for Berkshire in 1558. His mother had Thomas Vicars' translation of Bartholomew Keckermann's Latin 'Manuduction to Theology' dedicated to her.

Fettiplace was baptised at Childrey on 23 May 1583. In 1626, Fettiplace was elected Member of Parliament for Berkshire. He was re-elected in 1628 and sat until 1629 when King Charles decided to rule without parliament for eleven years. He was High Sheriff of Berkshire in 1630.

In April 1640, Fettiplace was re-elected MP for Berkshire for the Short Parliament, and was elected again for the Long Parliament in November 1640. He supported the King during the Civil War. He joined the King's parliament at Oxford and was disabled from sitting in parliament on 22 January 1644. He was later fined £1,943 for his delinquency. His nephew, also called John Fettiplace, was a colonel in the army of Prince Rupert and was made a baronet by Charles II after the Restoration.

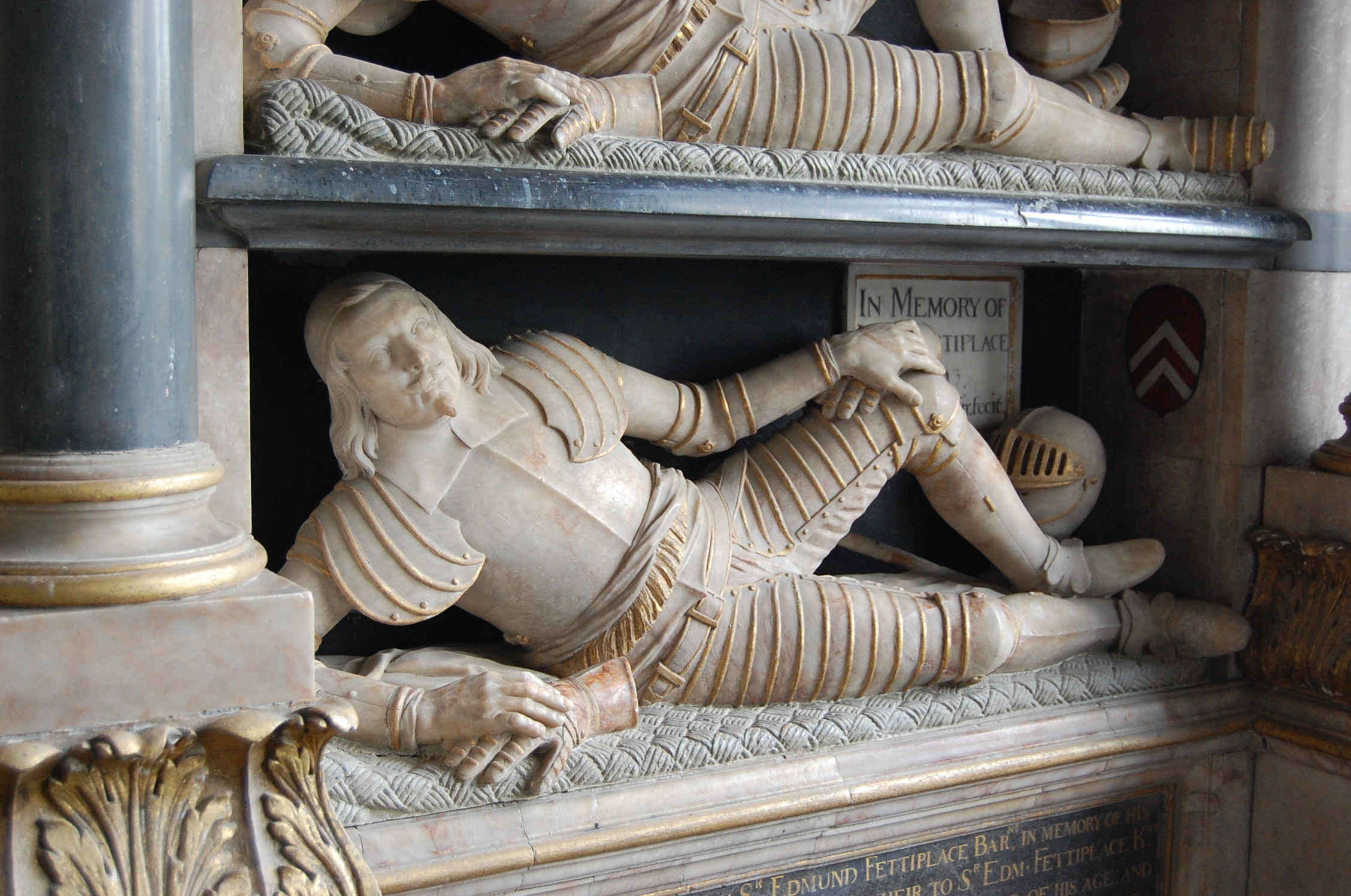
John Fettiplace memorial, St Mary's church, Swinbrook

He died unmarried on 21 March 1658 and is commemorated by one of the famous triple-decker effigial monuments in Swinbrook Church. His estate passed to his nephew, Sir John Fettiplace, 1st Baronet

Parliament of England
Preceded by Edmund Dunch; Sir Francis Knollys	Member of Parliament for Berkshire; 1626–1629; With: Edmund Dunch 1626; Sir Richard Harrison 1628–1629	Parliament suspended until 1640
Vacant Parliament suspended since 1629	Member of Parliament for Berkshire; 1640–1644; With: Henry Marten 1640–1643	Succeeded by Henry Marten; Sir Francis Pile, 2nd Baronet
