= Elinor Fettiplace =

English cookery book writer (born c. 1570)

Elinor Fettiplace (born Elinor Poole, later Elinor Rogers; c. 1570 – in or after 1647) was an English cookery book writer. Probably born in Pauntley, Gloucestershire, into an upper-class land-owning farming family, she married into the well-connected Fettiplace family and moved to a manor house, Appleton Manor, in the Vale of White Horse (then in Berkshire, now in Oxfordshire).

In common with many ladies of the Elizabethan era, Fettiplace wrote a manuscript book. It is now known under the title Elinor Fettiplace's Receipt Book, with details of recipes for dishes and meals, medical remedies and tips for running the household. She dated the work 1604, but it is possible that she began writing it several years earlier, when she was still living with her mother. The book was passed down through her family, initially to her niece, until it was handed to the husband of the twentieth-century writer Hilary Spurling. Spurling conducted research on Fettiplace's identity and the contents of the book, and published the work in 1986.

Fettiplace's husband died in 1615; she moved back to Gloucestershire and married a local man, Edward Rogers, who died in 1623. She lived until at least 1647.

== Life ==
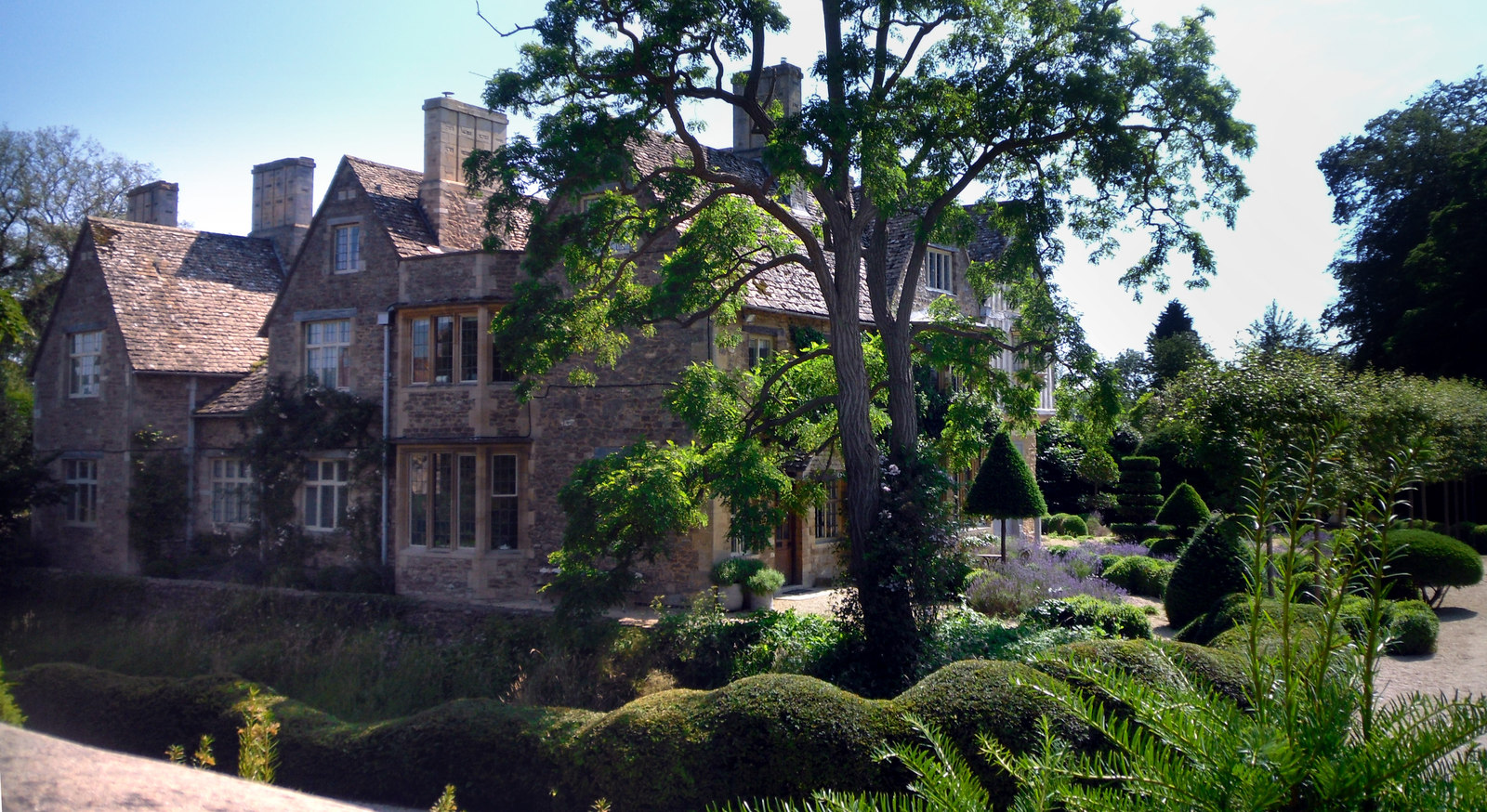
Appleton Manor in 2012

Elinor Poole was born around 1570, probably at Pauntley, Gloucestershire. (Note: Her first name also appears on contemporary documents as Elynor or Elianor, and the surname is given as variously as Fettyplace, Feteplace, Phetiplace, ffeteplace and Ffetiplact, among others.) Her parents were Henry Poole—later Sir Henry, Justice of the Peace, Member of Parliament and the High Sheriff of Gloucestershire—and Anne, née Wroughton, of Broad Hinton, Wiltshire. Elinor had two younger sisters, Frances and Dorothy, and three brothers, Giles, Devereux and Henry. Devereux, who was probably a year or so older than Elinor, was killed when he was 19, fighting alongside his father in France while under the command of Robert Devereux, 2nd Earl of Essex. The Poole family was a large landowner in the area, with farmland from Herefordshire through the Cotswolds, into Berkshire and down to Wiltshire. The family was well connected within the upper classes, and Elinor's living relatives included her cousins, the brothers Sir Carew and Sir Walter Raleigh. (Note: Fettiplace was also related on her grandmother's side to Richard Whittington (who left Pauntley to become the Lord Mayor of London and on whom the character Dick Whittington is based); one of her uncles (by marriage) was Sir John Thynne, the builder of Longleat.)

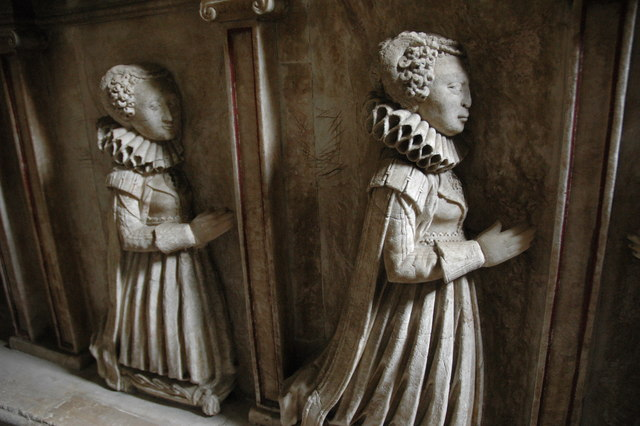
Fettiplace is depicted with her sisters, kneeling at their father's tomb at St Kenelm's Church, Sapperton.

In early 1589 Elinor Poole married Richard Fettiplace, of the Fettiplace family, in Berkshire. The marriage introduced Elinor to an ancient Norman family that owned large areas of heavily mortgaged land in the Vale of White Horse. She came to the marriage with a dowry of £400, a bequest of her grandfather, Sir Giles Poole. (Note: £400 in 1589 equates to approximately £133,000 in 2025, according to calculations based on the Consumer Price Index measure of inflation.) According to Hilary Spurling, Elinor's biographer, the dowry may have come with conditions that her new in-laws put their finances in order by selling some of the Fettiplace land. The couple had five children—three daughters and two sons—and lived in the manor house at Appleton, Oxfordshire, described as "relatively modest" by Spurling. (Note: What remains of Appleton Manor is described by the architectural historian Nikolaus Pevsner as "An amazing survival. Part of a manor-house of 1190 or 1200 with a doorway worthy of any major church." As at 2020 the manor house is Grade II* listed with Historic England, who note that it is "one of the oldest surviving inhabited manor houses in Britain".) (Note: There is no record that the children were baptised in the local parish of Appleton.) Two of their daughters died as infants and a third aged sixteen. It is possible, although uncertain, the couple had a fourth daughter. (Note: A memorial in Pauntley from 1630 from a husband to his dead wife reads "She was by birth a Fettiplace", although there is no confirmation that she was a daughter of Elinor and Richard.) Their son Henry was born around 1602, but nothing more is known about him. Their eldest child, John, was born in 1590. In 1606 he married his cousin Margaret, and the couple lived at Appleton; they were still resident there the following year when they had a son, Edmund. (Note: John Fettiplace died in 1619, leaving a wife and four children.)

On a normal day the manor would provide for between twenty and thirty people, which comprised both staff and the family, but during the seasonal feasts this number could double or triple, with fifty guests needing to be fed twice a day during the Twelve Days of Christmas. Fettiplace had a copy of the anatomist Charles Estienne's book Countrey Farme, which had been given to her by the nobleman Sir Henry Danvers; the book provided guidance on garden planning, and advice on growing herbs and vegetables. She spent time in the summer and autumn months preserving food for the winter, with the help of the estate's staff.

Fettiplace's husband died in 1615 and it appears she left Appleton Manor, giving advice to her daughter-in-law, Margaret, on how best to run it. When Fettiplace's father died in 1616, he left £500 in his will for her. He was buried in St Kenelm's Church, Sapperton. His ornate tomb shows his son kneeling next to him, and his three daughters, including Fettiplace, kneeling at the front. It is her only known likeness.

Fettiplace returned to within her own family's orbit at Sapperton, and married a man from Gloucester, Edward Rogers, who died in 1623. He was also buried at Sapperton church. Details of her death are unclear, but it was in or after 1647. There is no record of Fettiplace's death, and the last record of her is when she gave her receipt book to her niece; she dated the dedication 1647.

=== Personality ===
According to Spurling, the little that is known about Fettiplace's character suggests she was forceful, with a "firm view of her own importance". After her husband died, she continued to use the title of "Ladyship", although not entitled to; she continued the practice even after she married a commoner, Edward Rogers, and he had died. His memorial stone in St Kenelm's Church outlines his status from the view of her importance and ancestry.

Spurling concludes Fettiplace was an "efficient and practised manager" in the way she ran her household and, when her husband was absent, the family estate. She was interested in modern cookery and had a "cautious and considerate approach" to dispensing the medicines she prepared.

== Receipt Book ==
To make serop of tobaccho

Take a quart of water & three ounces of tobaccho, put the tobaccho in the water, & let it lie a night & a day close covered, then boile it to reduce it from a quart to a pinte, then straine it, & put to everie pinte a pound of sugar, then put in the whites of three or fowre eggs finelie beaten, then set it on the fire, & when it boiles scum it, then cover it close, & let it boile, till it bee serop.

— Sir Walter Raleigh's recipe, as recorded by Fettiplace

Ladies of the Elizabethan age would often keep manuscript books with details of "receipts" for dishes, meals, medical remedies and tips for running the household. (Note: The common name for a recipe was, at the time, "receipt".) Fettiplace's Receipt Book was bound in leather, written on good quality paper and with a fleur-de-lis of the Poole family crest stamped in gold on the cover; the work was signed by Fettiplace and dated 1604. Most of the work was written by the scribe Anthony Bridges, with the final part by a third party, possibly Bridges's assistant. Fettiplace's manuscript is one of the few such works to survive from that time. The food writer C. Anne Wilson considers it likely that the recipes were collected over several years: the social historian Janet Theophano suggests Fettiplace began writing it under her mother's direction.

In 1647 Fettiplace passed her Receipt Book to her niece and goddaughter, Anne Horner, (Note: Anne was the daughter of her younger brother Henry; her husband was Sir George Horner, the great-great grandson of Sir John Horner, who was the subject of the nursery rhyme "Little Jack Horner".) writing "Thes bock I geve to my deare nees and goddutar Mrs Anne Hornar desyring her to kepe it for my sake: 1647". The work was passed down through the generations until it was given to the husband of Hilary Spurling. She researched the background of the book and Fettiplace, and published the work in 1986. Reviewing the work, the historian A. L. Rowse described it as "a fascinating find" that deserved "to taste of the Victorian Mrs Beeton's success as a best seller".

Elinor Fettiplace's Receipt Book has been organised into twelve chapters by Spurling, each covering a month. Within the work are recipes for food, remedies for ailments and illnesses and tips for running the household. The Appleton estate was largely self-sufficient, and the Receipt Book describes how to make various household products, including perfume, ink, toothpaste, rat poison and weed killer. Fettiplace also describes the methods used to bleach linen or wash delicate fabrics such as gold weave and silks.

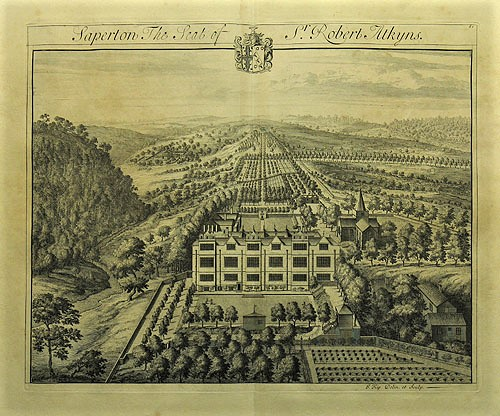
Sapperton, the home of the Poole family

Among her medical remedies, Fettiplace included treatments provided by friends. Sir Walter Raleigh provided a recipe for "Syrup of Tobacco", used to sooth lung trouble, or curing a long-held cough, and "Tobacco Water"; John Hall, a physician and the son-in-law of William Shakespeare, provided a method of stopping nosebleeds. (Note: The method was to use a pinch of the patient's dried blood as snuff and apply cloths soaked in plantain and tansy.) Among the other medicinal entries included in the book were eleven remedies for a bad back, seven for insomnia, thirty-six for wound dressing, forty-five for failing eyesight, sixteen for coughs and twenty-four for stomach ache. The book also included an entry for medicine for the plague: the disease was rampant in England the early years of the 1600s, including around Oxfordshire and Berkshire in 1604—the year Fettiplace marked in her book.

In an examination of the recipes in a historical context, Spurling concludes that the recipes were, for the time, modern, and that they embraced new tastes and styles, rather than the food of the medieval past, and contained elements of French and English styles of cooking that were still running strong 400 years later. Her book contains a recipe for meringues (which she called "White biskit bread"), which predates their first appearance in French recipe books, in François Massialot's 1692 work Nouvelle instruction pour les confitures.

Most of the recipes for food in the book would have been for produce from Appleton's estate, although there are some imported items for luxury goods. These include in the recipe for "Spanish Marmalad", among the ingredients for which are powdered pearls and gold:

Take five sponfulls of rose water and seaven sponfulls of suger finely beaten, make yt boyle you must have redy by you two handfulls of almondes blanched and finely grownd, with 15 or 16 dates ye stones and whights taken out, and yor dates cut smale and beaten in a morter, then mixe yor dates and almondes well together, then put yt in your Sirrope stirringe yt well together, then take on sponfull of pouder of sinamond, halfe a sponfull of ye pouder of pearles, three sheetes of Golde, stirr all theise well, but you must take yt first from the fire or else yt will bee to stiff that you can-not mingell yt, before yt bee through cold put yt upp into a marmalad boxe.

Elinor Fettiplace's Receipt Book is an important historical work showing what domestic life was like for part of society in Elizabethan England, and the work has been used as a source in several such published works. (Note: For example in Gillian Riley's, Renaissance Recipes, Denise Dersin's What Life Was Like in the Realm of Elizabeth, Jeffrey L. Singman's Daily Life in Elizabethan England and Alison Sim's The Tudor Housewife.) Few objects other than Fettiplace's manuscript have survived from the Pooles' manor at Sapperton.

== Notes, references and sources ==
=== Sources ===
==== Books ====
- Dersin, Denise, ed. (1998). What Life Was Like in the Realm of Elizabeth. Alexandria, Virginia: Time Life Books. ISBN 978-0-7835-5456-3.
- Dickson Wright, Clarissa (2011). A History of English Food. London: Random House. ISBN 978-1-4481-0745-2.
- Lehman, Gilly (2003). The British Housewife: Cooking and Society in 18th-century Britain (Kindle ed.). Totness, Devon: Prospect Books. ISBN 978-1-909248-00-7.
- Pevsner, Nikolaus (2002). Berkshire. The Buildings of England series. New Haven, Connecticut: Yale University Press. ISBN 978-0-300-09582-1.
- Riley, Gillian (1993). Renaissance Recipes. San Francisco, California: Pomegranate Artbooks. ISBN 978-1-5664-0577-5.
- Shrewsbury, J. F. D. (2005). A History of Bubonic Plague in the British Isles. Cambridge, Cambridgeshire: Cambridge University Press. ISBN 978-0-521-02247-7.
- Sim, Alison (1996). The Tudor Housewife. Montreal, Quebec and Kingston, Ontario: McGill–Queen's University Press. ISBN 978-0-7509-1143-6.
- Singman, Jeffrey L. (1995). Daily Life in Elizabethan England. Westport, Connecticut: Greenwood Press. ISBN 978-0-3132-9335-1.
- Spurling, Hilary (1987). Elinor Fettiplace's Receipt Book. Harmondsworth, Middlesex: Penguin. ISBN 978-0-1400-8828-1.
- Theophano, Janet (2002). Eat My Words: Reading Women's Lives Through the Cookbooks They Wrote. New York: Palgrave. ISBN 978-0-312-23378-5.
- Wall, Wendy (2015). Recipes for Thought: Knowledge and Taste in the Early Modern English Kitchen. Philadelphia, Pennsylvania: University of Pennsylvania Press. ISBN 978-0-8122-9195-7.

==== Journals ====
- Wilson, C. Anne (1987). "A Cookery-Book and Its Context: Elizabeth Cookery and Lady Fettiplace". Petits Propos Culinaires. 25: 8–12.

==== News ====
- Deitz, Paula (24 June 1987). "Home Economics, Elizabethan Style". The New York Times.
- Glendinning, Victoria (18 December 1986). "Bacon Cuisine". The Times. p. 15.

==== Websites ====
- "Appleton Manor, Appleton-with-Eaton – 1198061". Historic England.
- Clark, Gregory (2023). "The Annual RPI and Average Earnings for Britain, 1209 to Present (New Series)". MeasuringWorth. Archived from the original on 1 April 2023.
- "Receipt and recipe". British Library. Archived from the original on 19 February 2020.
- Spurling, Hilary (2004). "Fettiplace [née Poole; other married name Rogers], Elinor, Lady Fettiplace (b. c. 1570, d. in or after 1647)". Oxford Dictionary of National Biography (online ed.). Oxford University Press. doi:10.1093/ref:odnb/50673. (Subscription, Wikipedia Library access or UK public library membership required.)
