= Besselsleigh =

Village in Oxfordshire, England

Coordinates: 51.71°N 1.35°W

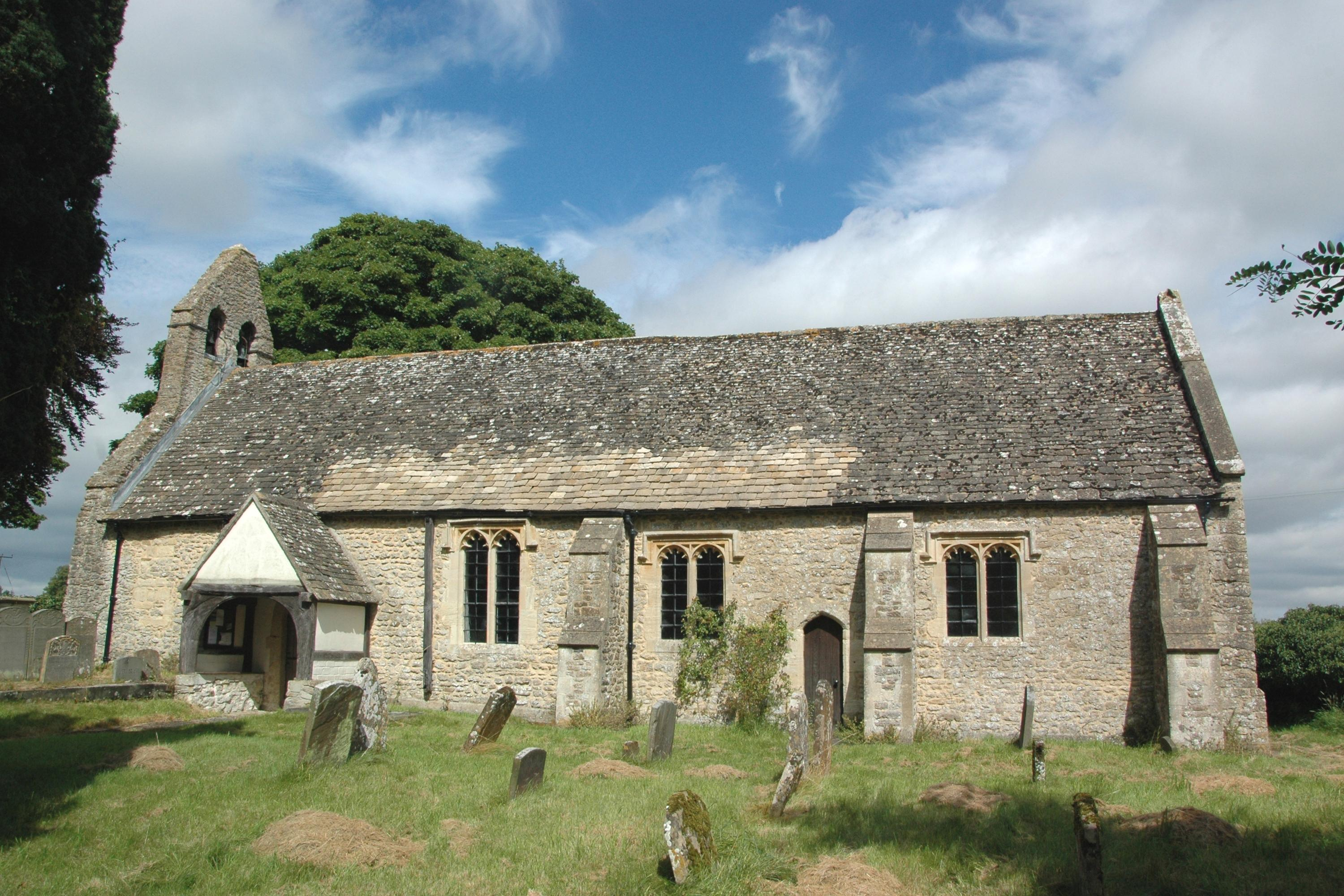
- St Lawrence's parish church

- Location within Oxfordshire
- Area: 3.67 km^{2} (1.42 sq mi)
- Population: 87 (2001 Census)
  - Density: 24/km^{2} (62/sq mi)
- OS grid reference: SP4501
- Civil parish: Besselsleigh
- District: Vale of White Horse
- Shire county: Oxfordshire
- Region: South East
- Country: England
- Sovereign state: United Kingdom
- Post town: Abingdon
- Postcode district: OX13
- Dialling code: 01865
- Police: Thames Valley
- Fire: Oxfordshire
- Ambulance: South Central
- UK Parliament: Witney

Besselsleigh or Bessels Leigh is an English village and civil parish about 4 1/2 miles (7 km) southwest of Oxford. Besselsleigh was part of Berkshire until the 1974 boundary changes transferred it to Oxfordshire. The village is just off the A420 road between Oxford and Swindon.

== Manor ==
=== Domesday Book ===
Besselsleigh is almost certainly the "Lea" or "Leigh" owned by a Saxon named Earmund in the 7th century. At the time of the Domesday Book in 1086 it was recorded (as "Leie") as having been held before the Norman Conquest by Northmann of Mereworth of Abingdon Abbey and to have passed under the same overall ownership to the minor feudal lord William the Chamberlain.

=== Bessels ===
The manor of Leigh was acquired by the family of Bessels (or Besils, Bessiles, etc.) in the mid-14th century, possibly by Thomas Bessels, and by the next century had become known as "Bessels Leigh" to distinguish it from the many other places in England called "Leigh". According to the antiquary John Leland, the Bessels family had been settled at Besil's Leigh in Berkshire since the reign of Edward I, but originated in Provence in France and were "men of activitye in feates of arms as it appearith in monuments at Legh; how he faught in listes with a straunge knyghte that challengyd hym, at the whitche deade the kynge and quene at that time of England were present."

=== Fettiplace ===
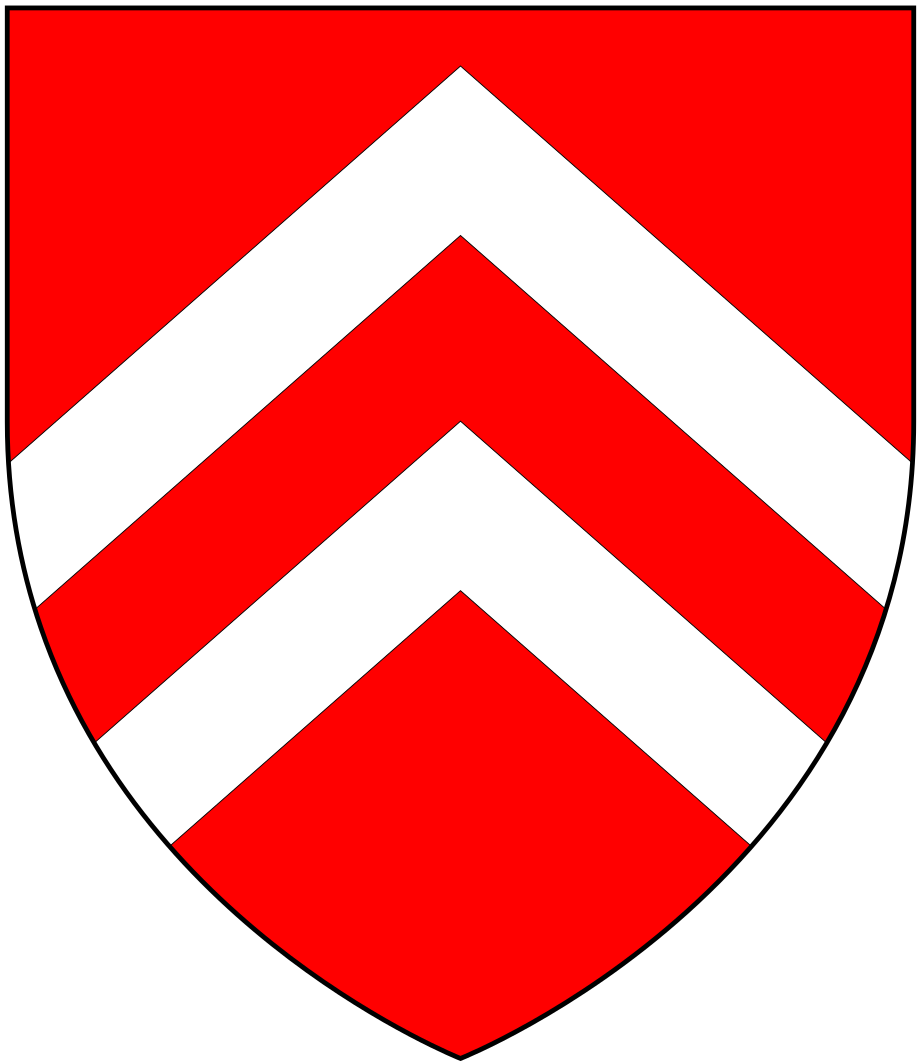
Arms of Fettiplace: Gules, two chevrons argent

Richard Fettiplace (c.1456–1511) married Elizabeth Besil, the only daughter and heiress of William Besil of Besil's-Leigh, which he made his chief seat. Richard was buried in the chancel of Poughley Priory Church, near Great Shefford in Berkshire, and bequeathed property to that church and a 99-year lease lands to a chantry chapel within the parish church of East Shifford "to keep an obiit there for my soul and to yearly keep in order the said parish church and to maintain lights there." In January 1527, Edward Fettiplace, Treasurer to the Charles Brandon, 1st Duke of Suffolk, wrote to Thomas Cromwell, upbraiding him with breaking his word as to granting him the site of the dissolved Poughley Priory, on the faith of which he had given Cromwell 40 shillings at the time of its dissolution, but the lease had been granted to another man. Fettiplace complains that he had bought of Cromwell certain implements belonging to the Priory, of which he left there the well bucket and rope, and a brass pan set in the wall to brew with, which said implements the scholars of the Cardinal's College "have perused and worn in the time of their lying there," but the bursar refuses to pay for them.

In February 1529, Edward Fettiplace wrote again to Cromwell desiring his interest that he might be assured of more years in the farm of Poughley. From this letter it is evident that Cromwell had been recently visiting the dismantled priory, as Fettiplace records a visit to Poughley, on "the Thursday after our departing," of one John Edden who came with a cart to carry off such stuff as was appointed to go to Wolsey's College at Oxford; the bedding was in Fettiplace's chamber, which was locked, but Edden "with great oaths and with levers brak up the doors." The great-grandson of Richard Fettiplace (d.1511) and Elizabeth Besil was Besil Fettiplace, Sheriff of Berkshire in 1583. John Fettiplace of Childrey was created a baronet in 1661. John Fettiplace (1527–1580) of Besselsleigh served as a Member of Parliament for Berkshire in 1558 and twice served as Sheriff of Berkshire, in 1568 and 1577. He was buried in Appleton Church in Oxfordshire, where survives his fine mural monument with recumbent effigy.

=== Lenthall ===
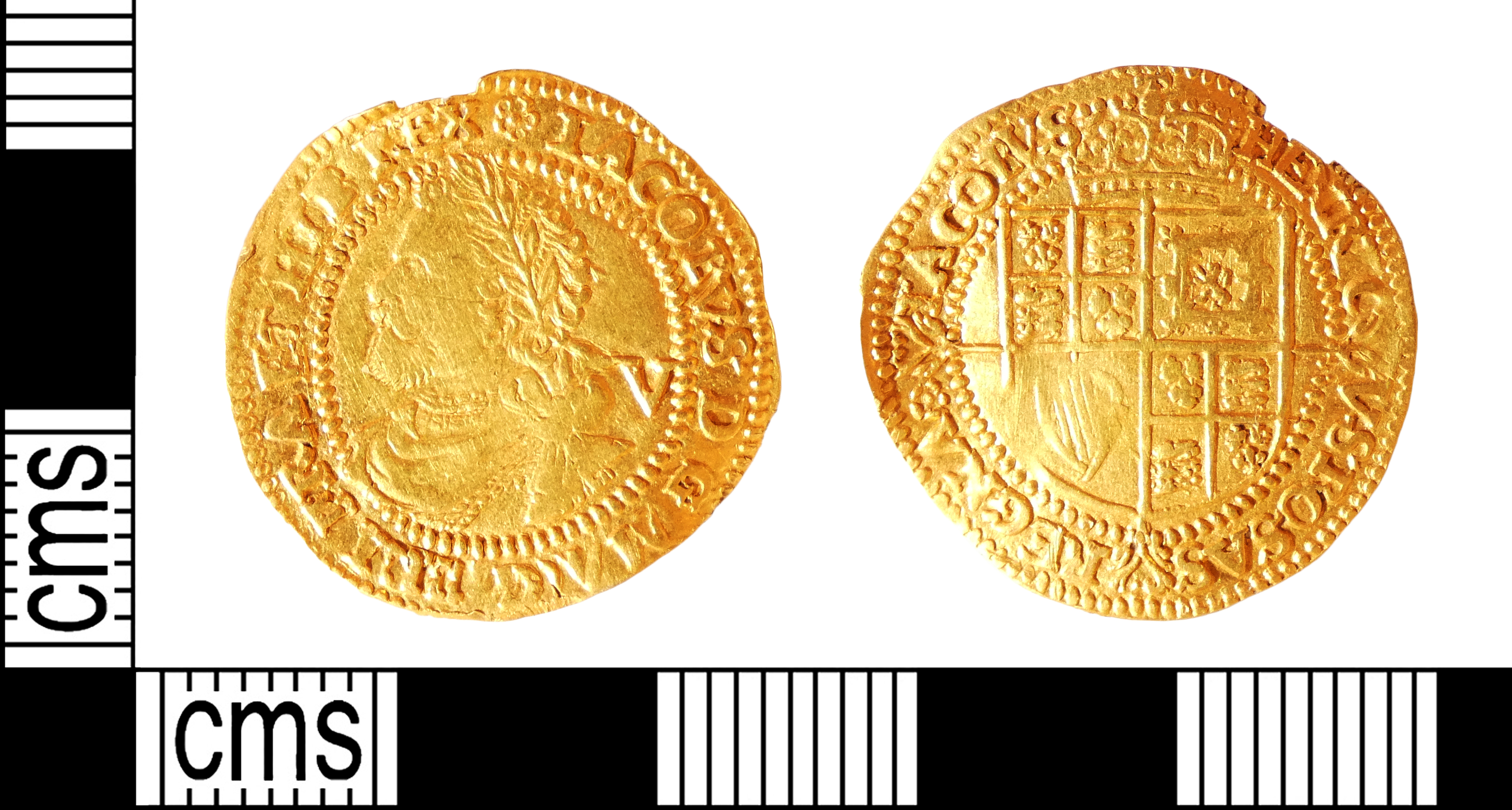
A gold quarter laurel coin, minted c. 1620 – c. 1621 during the reign of James I, found in Besselsleigh

The estate of Besils Leigh was sold, early in the 17th century, by the Fettiplace family to William Lenthall (1591–1662), Speaker of the House of Commons. "The old manor house, surrounding a quadrangular court, and containing a place of concealment, access to which was obtained in a most difficult and unusual manner, was a magnificent structure where it is said, Cromwell and other leading men of his day were frequently entertained". The house is now demolished.

== Parish church ==
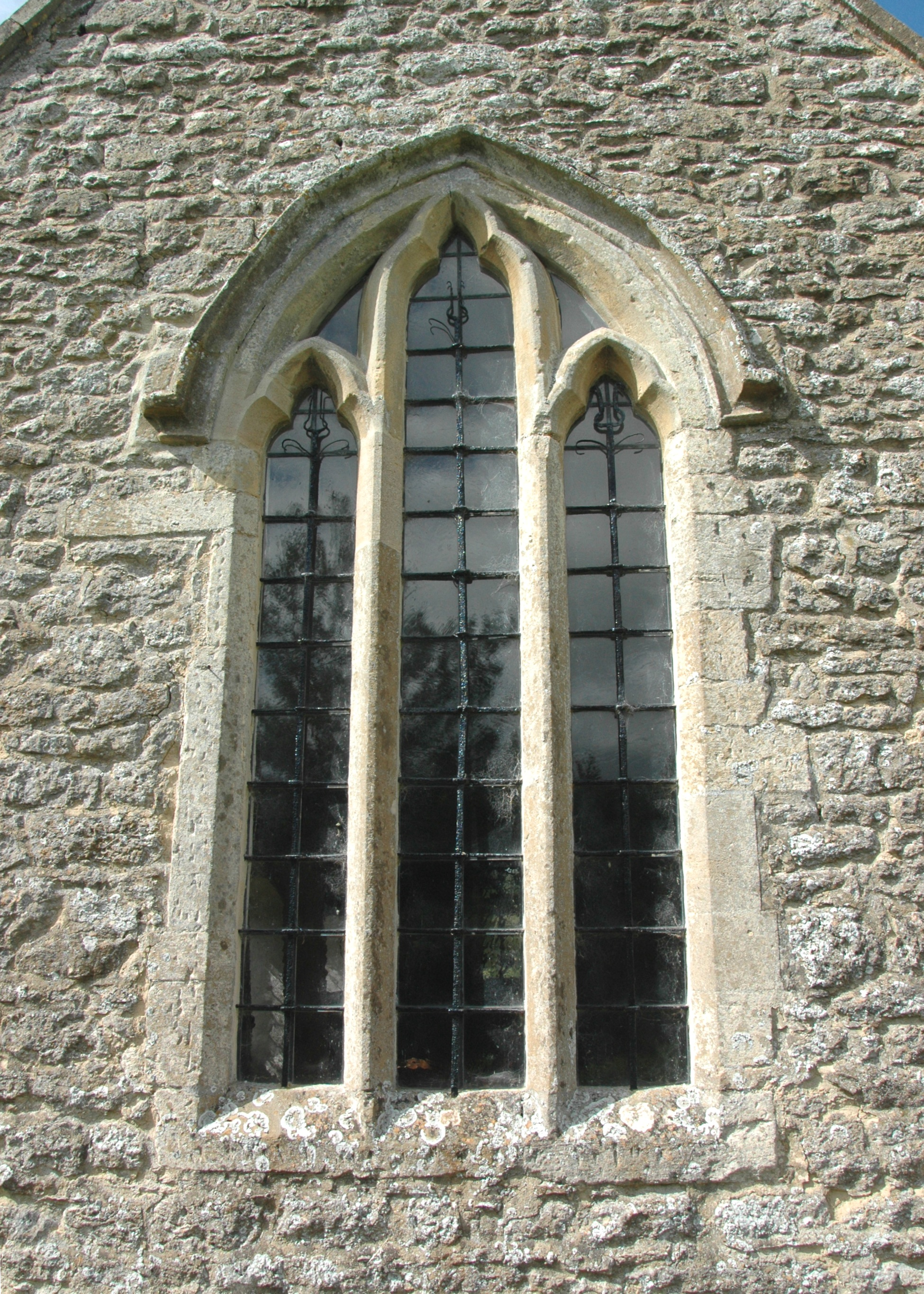
St Lawrence's parish church: 13th-century east window of chancel

The Church of England parish church of Saint Lawrence existed by the 12th century, and the west wall, Norman south door and possibly some other parts survive from this time. The church was rebuilt in the latter part of the 13th century, which is the date of the Decorated Gothic west window of the nave and east window of the chancel. Most of the other windows are Perpendicular Gothic: that in the north wall of the chancel from the 14th century and others in the church from the 15th century. In 1632 William Lenthall paid for St Lawrence's to be "beautified and repaired" and in 1788 William John Lenthall paid for further works on the church. The font is 17th-century and the pulpit is 18th-century. St Lawrence's is a Grade II* listed building. Since 2015 the church has not been in regular use, and is not normally open for visitors.

== World War II air crash ==
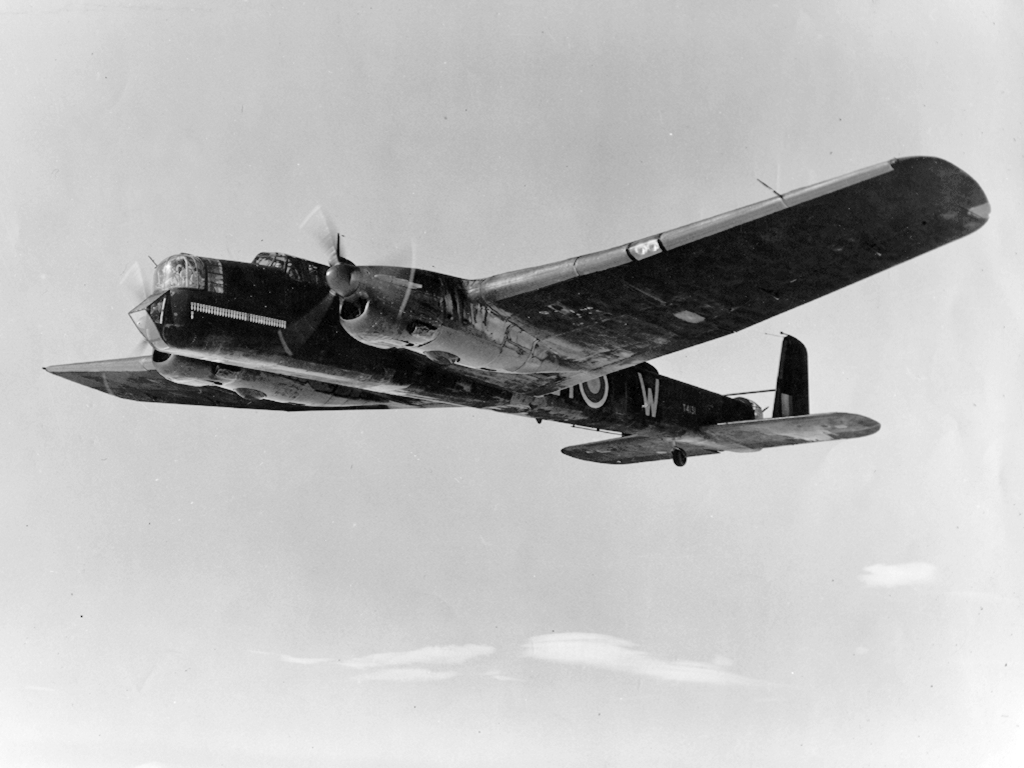
Armstrong Whitworth Whitley V aircraft similar to T4337 which crashed at Great Park Farm

On 14 March 1944 an Armstrong Whitworth Whitley V bomber aircraft, T4337 from No. 10 Operational Training Unit RAF at Abingdon, was on circuits and landings practice when its pilot lost control while changing from flare path to instruments. The aircraft crashed onto what was then a military firing range at Great Park Farm, Besselsleigh, and almost immediately burst into flames.

At the time United States Army soldiers were billeted at Besselsleigh Park. A local man, Ronald Amey, and three soldiers attempted to rescue the crew. The pilot, Sgt Douglas C Adamson (RCAF) and the navigator Flying Officer Allan G Lillico (RCAF) were killed in the crash. Air Gunner Sgt Richard T Bunt (RCAF) who was the rear gunner, after several attempts, freed wireless operator Sgt O'Brien from the burning aircraft. O'Brien died six days later in the John Radcliffe Infirmary, Oxford. For his bravery, Sgt Bunt was awarded the British Empire Medal (Military Division). He died in his home country Canada in 1983.

The pilot, Sgt Douglas C Adamson and the navigator Flying Officer Allan G Lillico are buried in the Commonwealth War Graves Commission section of Botley Cemetery, on the outskirts of Oxford. Wireless Operator Sgt Jeremiah O'Brien (RAF) is buried in Alperton Cemetery, North London.

The citation for Sgt Bunt's BEM for gallantry reads as follows:

'Sergeant Bunt was the tail gunner in an aircraft which crashed and burst into flames during practice flying one night in March, 1944. He was thrown clear and stunned but did not suffer any serious injury or burns. On hearing cries from the wireless operator, who was trapped in the blazing wreckage, Sergeant Blunt attempted to reach him, approaching the aircraft from the side furthest from the most intense part of the fire and the fuel tanks. Even so heat compelled him to retire but he again attempted an approach, this time passing near to the blazing fuel tanks. He eventually succeeded in dragging the wireless operator, whose clothes were on fire, to safety and remained with him until help arrived. This was achieved just before the petrol tanks exploded. In rescuing his companion Sergeant Bunt sustained burns to his face and wrists and it was subsequently found that he had sustained a fractured humerus. This airman displayed great bravery under harassing circumstances.'

Ron Amey went on to succeed his father William Amey as head of the Amey quarrying and construction company.

== Economy and amenities ==
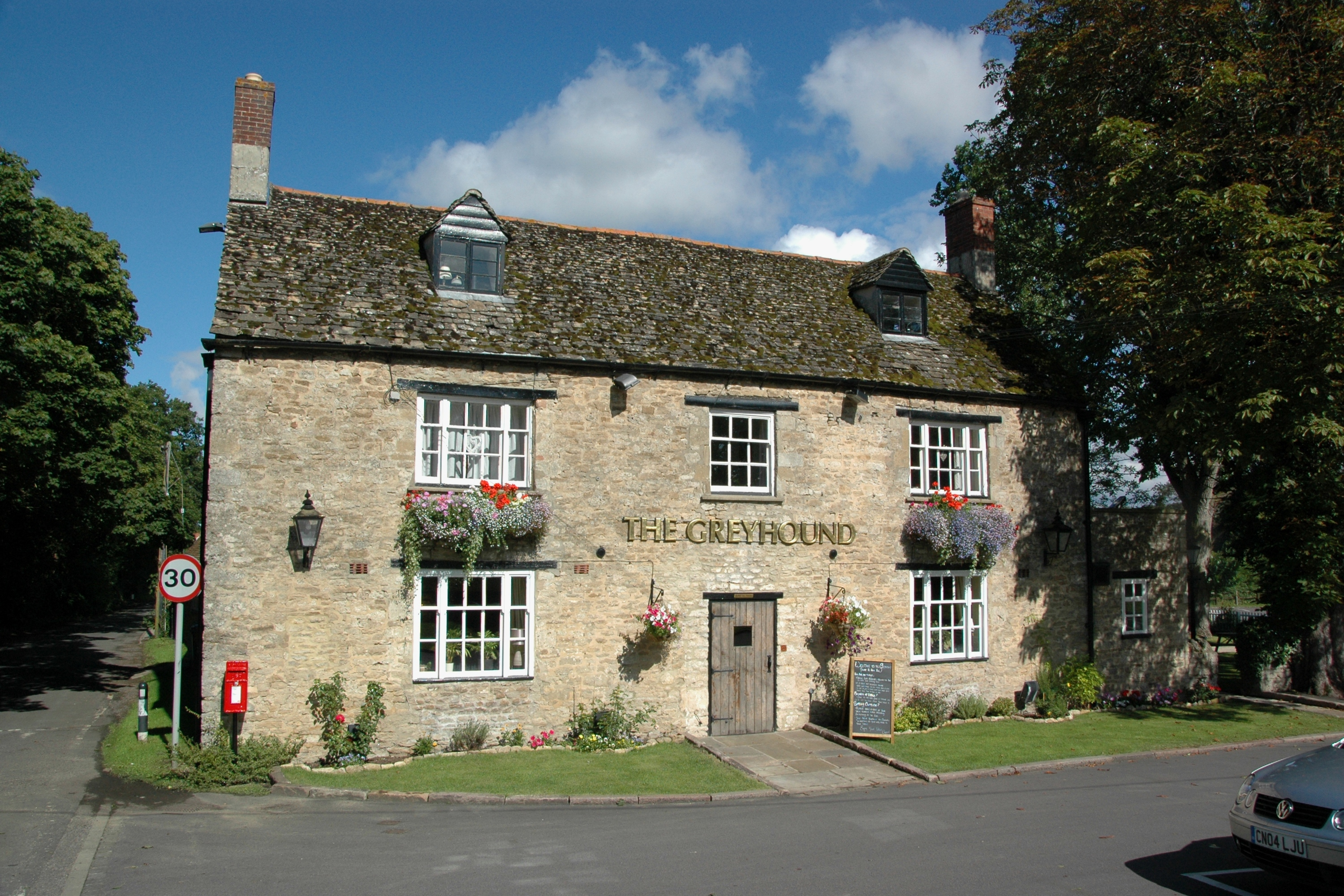
The Greyhound public house

Besselsleigh has a public house, the Greyhound. The Greyhound is in the coat of arms of the Lenthall family who used to own Besselsleigh Hall. Parklands Campus (formerly Bessels Leigh School and Spires School) at the edge of the village is an independent special school for boys and girls aged 11 to 16, run by the charity Action for Children.

== See also ==
- Marcham, where an RAF Armstrong Whitworth Whitley aircraft crashed on a training flight in 1942

== Sources ==
- Page, WH; Ditchfield, PH, eds. (1924). A History of the County of Berkshire. Victoria County History. Vol. 4. assisted by John Hautenville Cope. London: The St Katherine Press. pp. 393–398.
- Pevsner, Nikolaus (1966). Berkshire. The Buildings of England. Harmondsworth: Penguin Books. p. 86.

Media related to Besselsleigh at Wikimedia Commons
