= Pile baronets =

Set index for Pile baronets

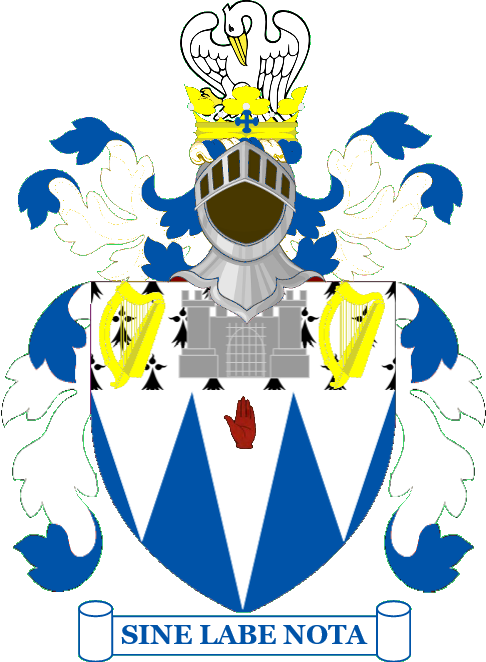
The armorial achievement of the Pile baronets of Kenilworth House

There have been two Baronetcies created for persons with the surname Pile, one in the Baronetage of England and one in the Baronetage of the United Kingdom. As of 2026 the latter is extant.

- Pile baronets of Compton-Beauchamp (1628)
- Pile baronets of Kenilworth House (1900)
