= Francis Pile =

English politician

Sir Francis Pile, 2nd Baronet (c. 1617 – 1649) was an English politician who sat in the House of Commons between 1645 and 1649.

Pile was the son of Sir Francis Pile, 1st Baronet of Compton-Beauchamp and his wife Elizabeth Popham, daughter of Sir Francis Popham. He inherited the baronetcy on the death of his father in 1635.

In 1645, Pile was elected Member of Parliament for Berkshire in the Long Parliament. He sat until his death before February 1649.

Pile married firstly Mary Dunch, daughter of Samuel Dunch of Pusey, Berkshire, and secondly on 18 July 1639 Jane daughter of Rt Rev. John Still, Bishop of Bath and Wells. His son died young and with daughters remaining the baronetcy passed to his brother Seymour.

Parliament of England
Preceded by John Fettiplace; Henry Marten	Member of Parliament for Berkshire; 1645–1649; With: Henry Marten	Succeeded by Henry Marten; Philip Earl of Pembroke
Baronetage of England
Preceded by Francis Pile	Baronet (of Compton); 1635–1649	Succeeded by Seymour Pile
