= Pile baronets of Compton-Beauchamp (1628) =

Pile baronets
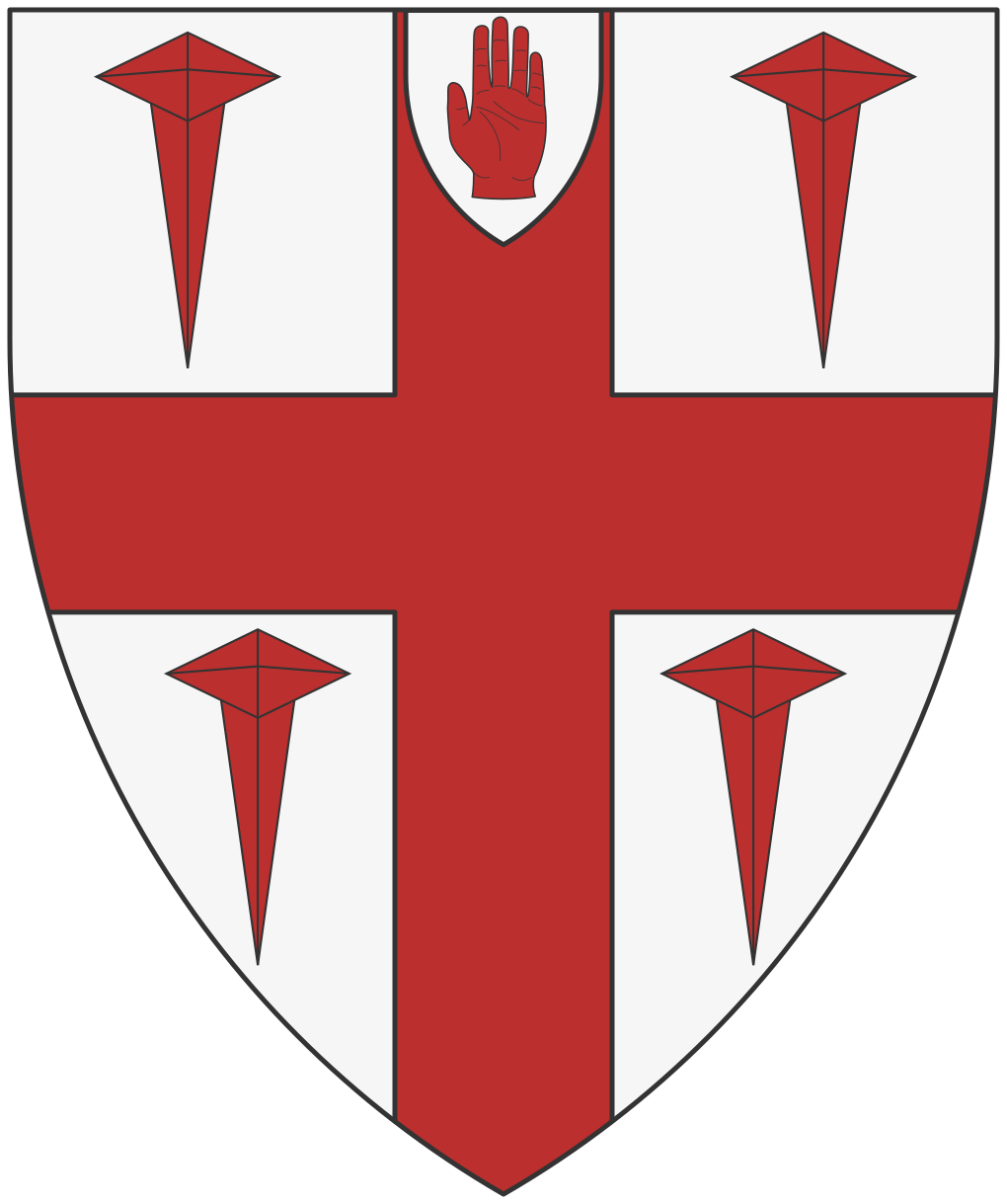
- Escutcheon of the Pile baronets of Compton-Beauchamp
- Creation date: 1628
- Status: extinct
- Extinction date: 1761
- Arms: Argent, a cross between four nails gules

The Pile baronetcy, of Compton in the County of Berkshire, was created in the Baronetage of England on 12 September 1628 for Francis Pile, a wealthy landowner in Wiltshire, for services to the Crown.

The 2nd Baronet represented Berkshire in the Long Parliament, by recruiter election. The title became extinct on the death of the 6th Baronet in 1761.

== Pile baronets, of Compton-Beauchamp (1628) ==
- Sir Francis Pile, 1st Baronet (1589–1635)
- Sir Francis Pile, 2nd Baronet (c. 1617–1649)
- Sir Seymour Pile, 3rd Baronet (c. 1618–c. 1670)
- Sir Francis Pile, 4th Baronet (died c. 1689)
- Sir Seymour Pile, 5th Baronet (died c. 1730)
- Sir Francis Pile, 6th Baronet (died 1761), left no male heir.
