= Appleton Manor =

Listed manor house in Oxfordshire, England

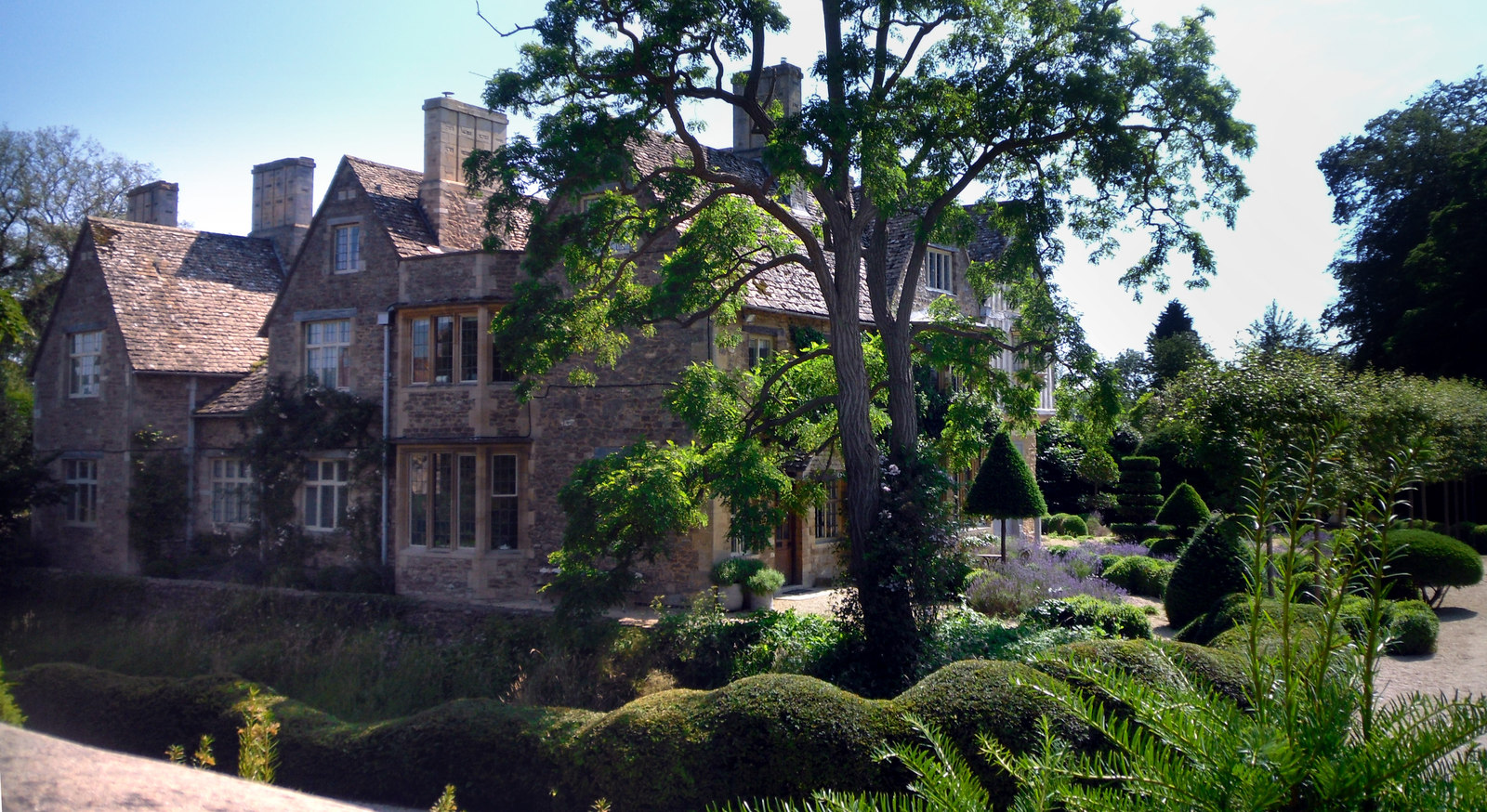

- Location within Oxfordshire

General information
- Type: Manor house
- Architectural style: Vernacular / Arts & Crafts
- Location: Appleton, Oxfordshire, England
- Coordinates: 51.7106°N 1.3594°W
- Construction started: c. 1200
- Governing body: Privately owned

Listed Building – Grade II*
- Official name: Appleton Manor
- Designated: 6 August 1952
- Reference no.: 1198061

Listed Building – Grade II
- Official name: Manor Barn with gatehouse and attached walls north-west of Appleton Manor
- Designated: 6 August 1952
- Reference no.: 1048428

Appleton Manor is a manor house in Appleton, Oxfordshire, England. Dating from around 1200, it is among the oldest inhabited manor houses in England, described by Sir Nikolaus Pevsner as "an amazing survival". It is a Grade II* listed building.

== History ==
Appleton Manor dates from 1190 to 1200. It was originally moated and elements of the, now dry, moat remain. Its earliest recorded owner was a Miles Crispin, who held the manor in 1086. At the time of Domesday, the site was held by a Richard fitz Reinfrid. The construction of the present manor house was likely undertaken by his grandson, Richard de Appleton, or by his great-grandson, Thomas. In the 16th century it came into the possession of the Fettiplace family. During this period, the manor's most notable occupant, Elinor Fettiplace (c. 1570 – in or after 1647), lived at the house. Coming to the manor from Gloucestershire, on her marriage to Richard Fettiplace in 1589, Elinor kept a recipe book in which she recorded details of the meals prepared for the household.

In 1634 the estate was bought by William Lenthall who served as Speaker of the House of Commons throughout the English Civil War. In the 20th century, the manor was owned by Katherine Timpson, a wealthy American expatriate and daughter of a lawyer, John Henry Livingston. Timpson engaged the architects Detmar Blow and Ferdinand Billerey to undertake remodelling and renovation. The house remains privately owned and is not open to the public.

== Architecture and description ==
The manor house stands immediately adjacent to the parish church of St Laurence in the centre of the village. It is of two storeys with attics. The construction materials are limestone rubble with ashlar dressings. The roof is of slate. The original medieval floor plan is uncertain; Blow and Billerey remodelled the house on an L-plan. The house contains some important and rare examples of secular medieval and Tudor stone carving. The gardens were redesigned by Arne Maynard in the 21st century and a modernist pool house was constructed by Stephen Marshall, architects.

Appleton is among the oldest inhabited manor houses in England. On his visit in 1966, when undertaking research for the Berkshire volume in the Buildings of England series, Nikolaus Pevsner termed it, "an amazing survival". (Note: Appleton, in the Vale of the White Horse, was part of the county of Berkshire until the implementation of the Local Government Act 1972 in 1974, when it passed to Oxfordshire. The Pevsner Architectural Guides continued to respect the historic county boundaries on revision, placing Appleton in the Berkshire, rather than in the Oxfordshire, volume.) In their revised edition of the volume, published in 2010, Geoffrey Tyack and Simon Bradley note the "restrained and accomplished Arts & Crafts" remodelling undertaken by Blow and Billerey. The manor is a Grade II* listed building while its associated barn has a Grade II listing.

== See also ==
- Grade II* listed buildings in Oxfordshire
- Elinor Fettiplace's Receipt Book

== Sources ==
- Bond, James; Clark, David; Harrison, Jane; Rowley, Trevor (2017). "Appleton Manor: A "Most Remarkable Mansion"" (PDF). Oxoniensia. Oxford: Oxfordshire Architectural and Historical Society.
- Dickson Wright, Clarissa (2011). A History of English Food. London: Random House. ISBN 978-1-448-10745-2.
- HMSO (1974). Local government in England and Wales: A Guide to the New System. London: HMSO. ISBN 0-11-750847-0.
- Pevsner, Nikolaus (2002) [1966]. Berkshire. The Buildings Of England. New Haven, US and London: Yale University Press. ISBN 978-0-300-09582-1.
- Tyack, Geoffrey; Bradley, Simon; Pevsner, Nikolaus (2010). Berkshire. The Buildings Of England. New Haven, US and London: Yale University Press. ISBN 978-0-300-12662-4.
