= Parklands Campus =

Special school in Oxfordshire, England

Coordinates: 51.7063°N 1.3461°W

Parklands Campus was an independent non-maintained residential special school for boys and girls aged 11 to 19, near Abingdon, Oxfordshire, England. It closed in 2016, and has since this date been vacant. In 2018, Millgate Homes proposed a new development for the land, which is now completed.

It was run by the children's charity Action for Children.

Formerly Bessels Leigh School, it was taken over by children's charity Action for Children and relaunched as Spires School during the summer of 2009. In 2011, it was rebranded as Parklands Campus. It specialised in educating children with autism and related emotional and behavioural difficulties.
