= Elinor Fettiplace's Receipt Book =

1986 book compiling recipes from 1604 volume

Elinor Fettiplace's receipt book: Elizabethan country house cooking
- Cover of first edition
- Editor: Hilary Spurling
- Author: Hilary Spurling, Elinor Fettiplace
- Subject: Elizabethan era English cuisine
- Genre: family cookbook
- Publisher: The Salamander Press in association with Penguin Books
- Publication date: 1986
- Publication place: England

Elinor Fettiplace's Receipt Book is a 1986 book by Hilary Spurling containing and describing the recipes in a family cookbook inscribed by Elinor Fettiplace with the date 1604 and compiled in her lifetime: the manuscript contains additions and marginal notes in several hands. Spurling is the wife of a descendant of Fettiplace who had inherited the manuscript. The book provides a direct view of Elizabethan era cookery in an aristocratic country house, with Fettiplace's notes on household management.

The book was well received by critics as revealing previously unknown aspects of Elizabethan household life. Spurling was praised for testing the recipes, a challenging task. The historian Elaine Leong cautioned that the homely title could obscure the complex history of the text's authorship and ownership.

== Context ==
The Fettiplaces were an aristocratic English family of Norman descent, who lived in Berkshire and Oxfordshire. Elinor (née Poole) was the wife of Sir Richard Fettiplace, who lived at Appleton Manor at Appleton in what is now Oxfordshire (formerly in Berkshire). Born in around 1570 in Gloucestershire, she married Sir Richard in 1589 at the age of 19, and became part of an ancient land owning family that had acquired large debts and mortgages, having originally become wealthy from wool. The 'Book of Receipts', dated 1604, contained a relatively small collection of recipes that she had collected and annotated over the years. Her choice of subjects illustrates both her interests and needs, such as to preserve fruit, and her relationships with other women of her standing. Some of the recipes show the influence of Jean Liébault's La Maison Rustique, which was translated into English in 1616.

Fettiplace's manuscript is written in "fine, clear, cranky Shakespearean English". Many corrections are visible in the manuscript, from simple proof-reading to the addition of ingredients, changes to quantities and preparation times, and alternative methods. The tone is practical and down-to-earth. Apart from Elinor's recipes, the book contains marginal notes, and additional recipes by up to eight different hands, indicating that it grew over more than one lifetime. Its plain appearance without decoration is typical of private works of the period, and is in marked contrast to professionally-produced books. Such books functioned as receptacles "for personal creativity and ingenuity... ...and a legacy for female inheritance".

In 1647 Elinor left the manuscript to her niece, Anne Horner, "desyring her to kepe it for my sake". More recipes were added later in that century. The book then passed down in the family until it reached Hilary Spurling's husband.

The manuscript was not published in Fettiplace's time. It remained a private working document, not intended for readers outside her family. The book was passed on to other women in the family, who would have copied it for their own use, and added other recipes that they liked, as was customary. Such personal preference leads to what Spurling calls "curious omissions": no pork, ham, or bacon dishes except broth for a person with consumption; no duck, goose, or venison; no carrot or parsnip, "and only one mention of onion", for stewed oysters. The manuscript was originally copied out from Fettiplace's notes by Anthony Bridges. The recipes, by Fettiplace and others, were in no special order until Spurling arranged them for publication. The manuscript was not illustrated. However it was made to look elegant, being copied out in a careful handwriting on high-quality paper and bound in leather covers. The front cover is embossed in gold with the Poole family's coat of arms. The endpapers are made from fragments of medieval manuscripts written by monks. The social historian Janet Theophano suggests that Fettiplace began the collection at her mother's request, writing that she "most probably began recording recipes for sweetmeats and preserves under her mother's supervision. At the time of her marriage and her move to Appleton Manor… she brought with her some sort of receipt book."

== Editing and commentary ==
The introduction in the book includes an historical account of the Poole family, the Fettiplace family and Elizabethan life and times. The main text of the book is structured into 12 chapters, each one devoted to a month of the year. In all, the book contains over 200 recipes, largely as originally written, and commented and interpreted in detail by Hilary Spurling.

Each recipe is presented first in Fettiplace's text, under its original heading. This is immediately followed by an account of the recipe by Spurling, with quantities mentioned as the need for them arises, rather than being listed separately. She then discusses the recipe, sometimes comparing suggestions made by contemporary cooks like Gervase Markham (author of The English Huswife), indicating similar dishes, and situating the recipe in the tradition of English cuisine.

Spurling describes the text as being clear and simple: to preserve the Elizabethan feeling of the recipes, she limits her interventions to making the minimum of corrections necessary to avoid confusion. She notes that some terms in Elizabethan usage do not have their modern meanings; the term boyle means to simmer (gently) rather to boil vigorously. She leaves the spellings almost entirely in their original form, testing and annotating the recipes to enable readers to understand and cook from them.

== Publication ==
The book was published in 1986 by The Salamander Press in association with Penguin Books. It was then published in paperback by Penguin in 1987. The book includes an image of one page of the manuscript. The compilation gives a detailed view of Elizabethan era cookery and domestic life in an aristocratic country household. Editions include:

- Elisabeth Sifton Books, Viking, London and New York, 1986.
- Penguin Books, Harmondsworth, 1987.
- Faber and Faber, London, 2008.

== Recipes ==
Elinor Fettiplace provides recipes for various forms of bread, such as buttered loaves; for apple fritters; preserves and pickles; and a celebration cake for 100 people. New ingredients such as the sweet potato, which had arrived from the New World, feature in the book. The following recipe for dressing a shoulder of mutton calls for the use of the newly-available citrus fruits: it also illustrates the nature of Fettiplace's spellings and her individual style of writing:

Take a showlder of mutton and being halfe Roasted, Cut it in great slices and save the gravie then take Clarret wine and sinamond & sugar with a little Cloves and mace beatne and the peel of an oringe Cut thin and minced very smale. Put the mutton the gravie and these thinges together and boyle yt between two dishes, wringe the juice of an oringe into yt as yt boyleth, when yt is boyled enough lay the bone of the mutton beinge first Broyled in the dish with it then Cut slices of limonds and lay on the mutton and so serve yt in.

Fettiplace included a recipe for "White Bisket Bread", nowadays called meringue, using one and a half pounds of sugar, a handful of flour, and twelve beaten eggwhites. The recipe is older than François Massialot's 1692 work Nouvelle instruction pour les confitures where meringues first appear in French cuisine.

== Critical reception ==
Paula Deitz, writing in The New York Times, quotes Spurling's claim that the book describes "many aspects of Elizabethan household life about which historians had no knowledge". The Oxford historian A. L. Rowse described the book as "a fascinating find", and wrote that it deserved "to taste of the Victorian Mrs. Beeton's success as a best seller".

The novelist Lawrence Norfolk, writing in The Guardian, described the book as containing "recipes, remedies and preserving methods ... gathered over many years, almost like annotations in a family Bible". He praises Hilary Spurling for testing the recipes, "a heroic undertaking in a modern kitchen", only baulking at testing Sir Walter Raleigh's "Syrup of Tobacco" which was then widely grown in the West of England. He mentions especially "delicate cat's tongue biscuits", light sauces, and "liaisons whisked up" and describes Fettiplace's recipes as "a sophisticated cuisine but presented as typical of the time."

The historian Elaine Leong describes the effect of the modern title of this and similar books (Note: Elaine Leong lists these in her introduction "Receipt Books, c.1575-1800, from The Folger Shakespeare Library".) such as "Lady Sedley's Receipt Book" and "Ladie Borlase's Receiptes Booke" as "conjuring up a homey picture of the lady of the manor collecting all sorts of household information as part of her housewifely duties". Leong cautions that while the modern editors of these books "no doubt based their titles on ownership notes inscribed in the manuscripts ... these titles obscure the rich and complex stories of authorship and ownership connected with the texts."

== Sources ==
- Dickson Wright, Clarissa (2011). A History of English Food. Random House. pp. 149–169. ISBN 978-1-448107-45-2.
- Fettiplace, Elinor (1986). Spurling, Hilary (ed.). Elinor Fettiplace's Receipt Book: Elizabethan Country House Cooking. Viking. ISBN 9780140088281.
- Harris, Scarlett O. (2014). The Good Housewife's Receipt Book: Gender In The Early-Modern English Kitchen (PDF). California State University, Chico (MA Thesis).
- Lehman, Gilly (2003). The British Housewife: Cooking and Society in 18th-century Britain. Prospect Books. ISBN 978-1-909248-00-7.
