= Appleton, Oxfordshire =

Village in Oxfordshire, England

Coordinates: 51.710°N 1.361°W

Appleton
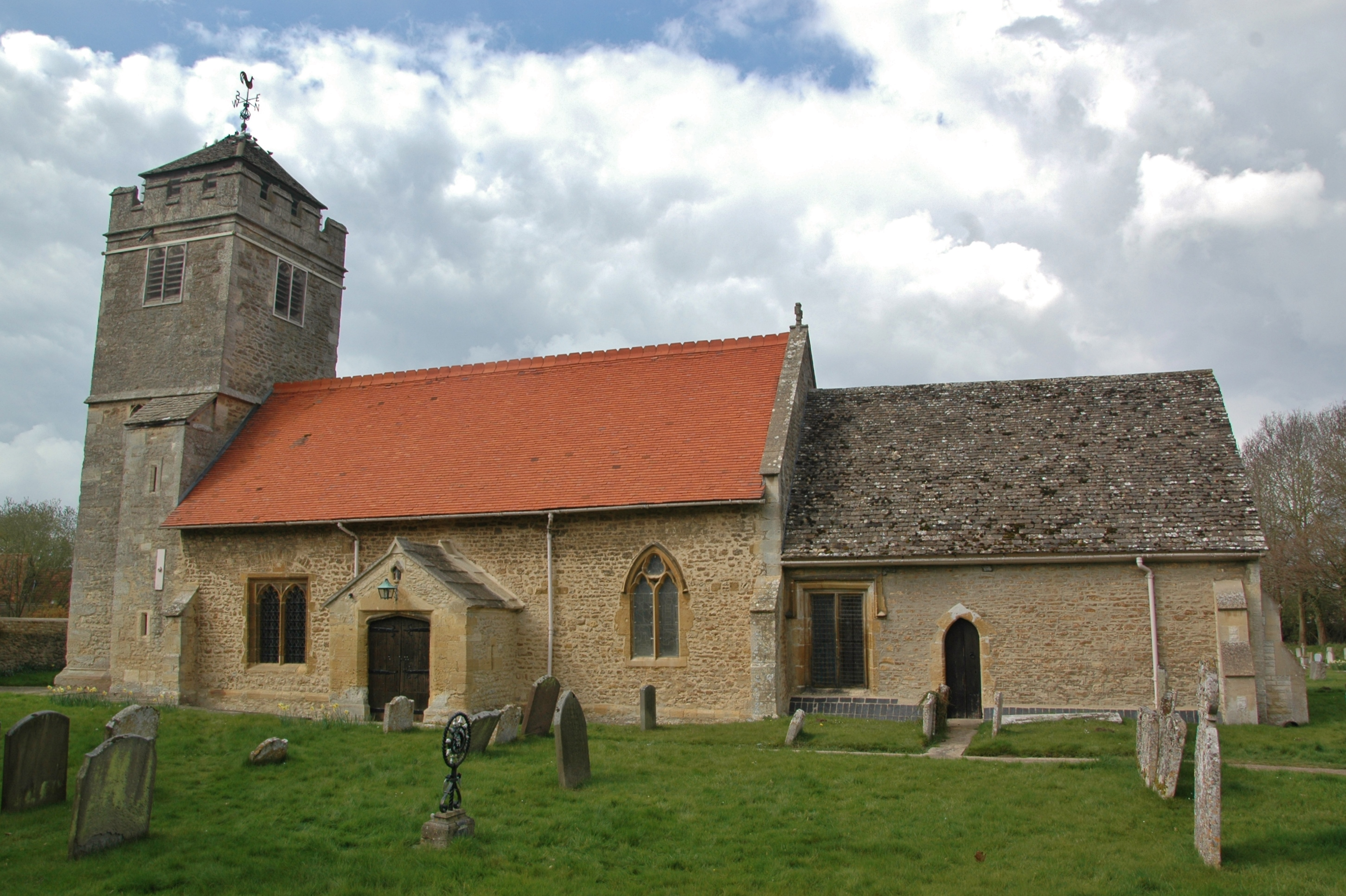
- St Laurence's parish church

- Location within Oxfordshire
- Population: 915 (parish, with Eaton) (2011 Census)
- OS grid reference: SP4401
- Civil parish: Appleton-with-Eaton
- District: Vale of White Horse
- Shire county: Oxfordshire
- Region: South East
- Country: England
- Sovereign state: United Kingdom
- Post town: Abingdon
- Postcode district: OX13
- Dialling code: 01865
- Police: Thames Valley
- Fire: Oxfordshire
- Ambulance: South Central
- UK Parliament: Oxford West and Abingdon
- Website: Appleton with Eaton

Appleton is a village in the civil parish of Appleton-with-Eaton, about 4 miles (6.4 km) northwest of Abingdon. Appleton was part of Berkshire until the 1974 boundary changes transferred it to Oxfordshire. The 2011 Census recorded Appleton-with-Eaton's parish population as 915.

== Toponymy ==
Appleton's toponym means "an orchard". In the 10th century it was Æppeltune or Appeltun, from then until the 17th century it evolved as Apletone, Apletune and Appelton, and in 1316 it was recorded as Aspelton. In the 10th century the village had the alternative name of Earmundeslæh, Earmundesleah, Earmundeslee or Earmundeslei, referring to King Edmund I, who in 942 granted it to Athelstan, one of his thegns, who may have restored it to Abingdon Abbey.

== Manor ==
Appleton Manor is a manor house which dates from about 1200 and has an ornate doorway. The Grade-II*-listed house has a porch and fireplace that were added in the Tudor era.

In the 9th century Abingdon Abbey held the manor of Appleton. The Danes sacked the abbey during the reign of King Alfred who later sequestered its estates, presumably including Appleton, because the monks had not made him a sufficient requital for vanquishing their enemies. .

The Domesday Book of 1086 records that Miles Crispin was the manorial overlord of Appleton and Eaton. There was also a second landholding at Appleton of which the overlord was Odo, Bishop of Bayeux, who was William of Normandy's half-brother. The Domesday Book records that Appleton had the most valuable fishery in Berkshire, valued at £1.4s.2d.

From then on the history is largely a record of grants and reversions, the best-known names to appear in the list of grantors or tenants being William de Merton, perhaps a kinsman of the founder of Merton College, Oxford, Sir William de Shareshull, Lord Chief Justice in the reign of Edward III, and William Lenthall, Speaker of the Long Parliament (this at a time when the Lordship of the Manor descended with that of Besselsleigh) and, of more local note, the Fettiplace and the Southby families.

== Parish church ==
The oldest parts of the Church of England parish church of Saint Laurence are 12th-century Norman. The north aisle was added late in that century, linked with the nave by a four-bay arcade of pointed arches. In the 13th century a new window and doorway were inserted in the south wall of the nave, as was the priest's doorway on the south side of the chancel. The east window of the chancel is 14th-century in style. In the 15th century the Perpendicular Gothic bell tower was added, a window inserted on the south side of the nave and the nave was re-roofed. The south porch was added early in the 16th century, the north aisle was rebuilt in the 17th century and the north porch was built in about 1700. The Gothic Revival architect CC Rolfe restored the nave in 1882–84. The church is a Grade II* listed building.

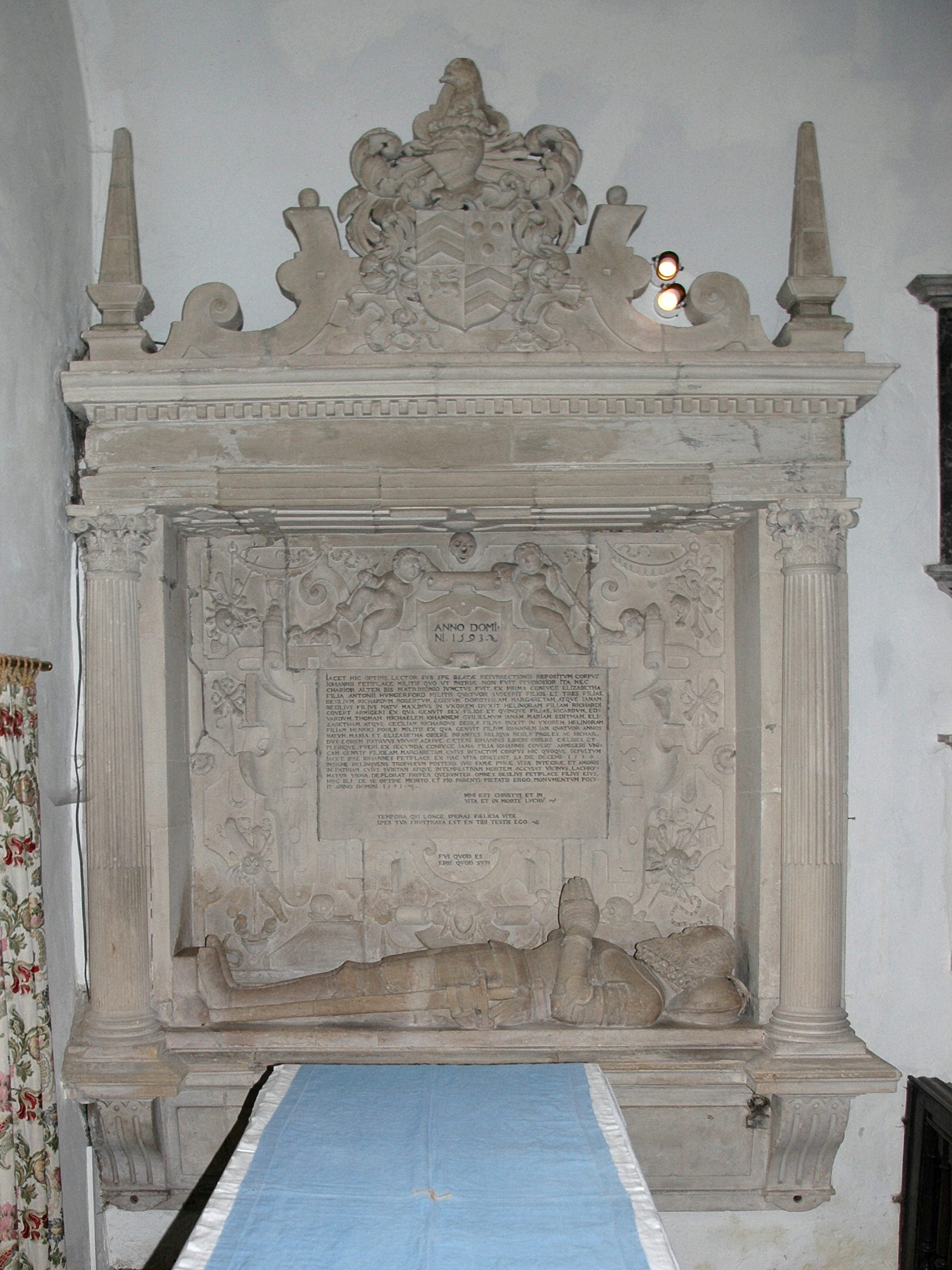
Monument erected in 1593 in memory of Sir John Fettiplace (died 1580)

Monuments in the church include a brass of two shrouded corpses in memory of John Goudrington, who died in 1518, and his wife. In the chancel is a Renaissance stone monument erected in 1593 in memory of Sir John Fettiplace, who died in 1580. It includes a life-size effigy of Sir John in 16th-century armour, a pair of Corinthian columns supporting a canopy surmounted by a pair of obelisks, and a long Latin inscription surrounded by extensive strapwork and a number of skulls.

The tower has a ring of ten bells, all cast by the Whitechapel Bell Foundry. Thomas II Mears cast the seventh bell in 1817. George Mears cast the second and third bells in 1859 and the ninth and tenor bells in 1861. Mears and Stainbank recast the eighth bell in 1874 and cast the treble, fourth and fifth bells in 1875. The sixth bell was recast, and the fittings for all bells replaced, and a new frame installed in 1977. The work was carried out by White's of Appleton, in the same village.

== White's of Appleton ==
In 1824 Alfred White founded White's of Appleton, a contractor for hanging church bells. The company is still based in Appleton and is now the oldest bellhanging company still trading in the United Kingdom.

== Amenities ==
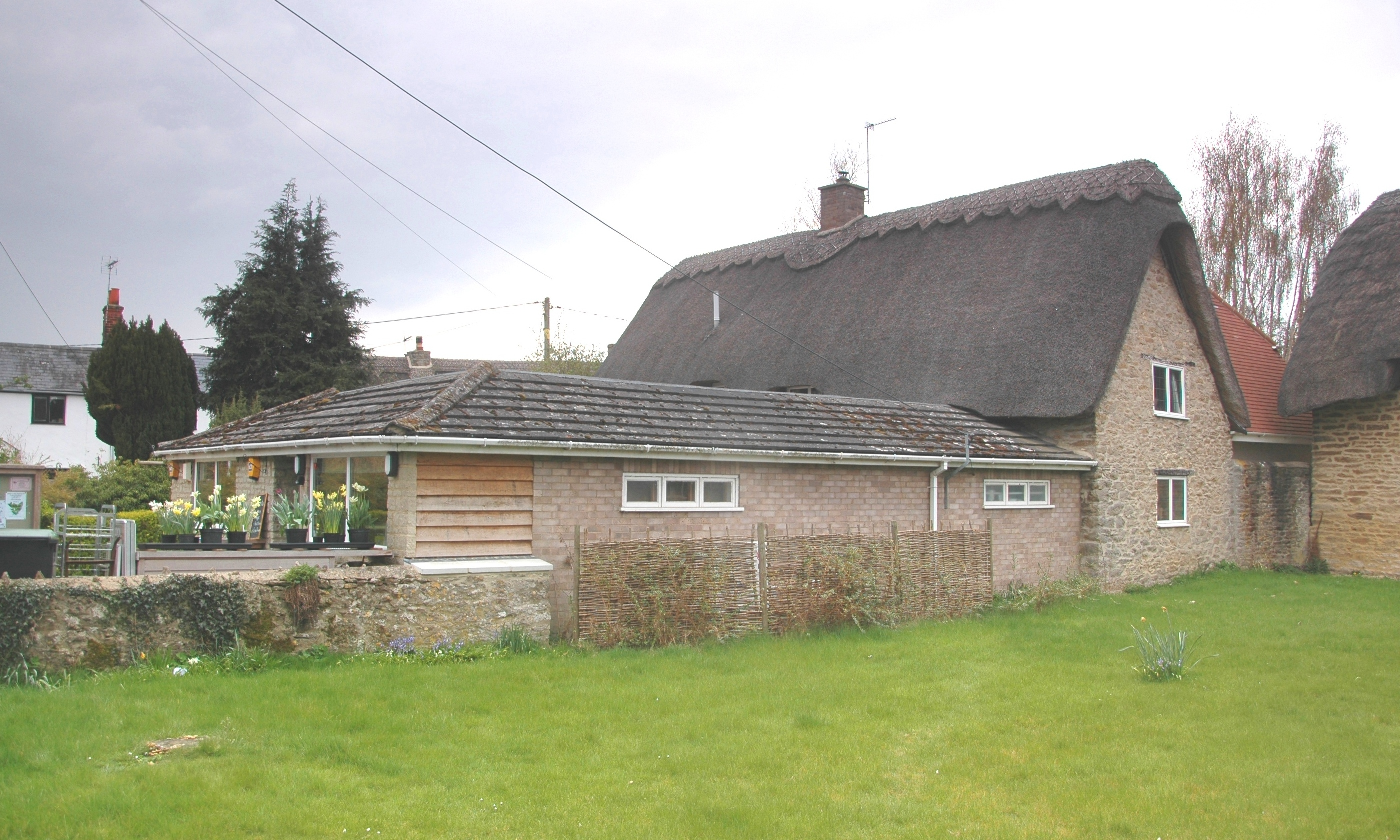
Appleton community shop and Post Office in Eaton Road

Appleton has a Church of England primary school, a Women's Institute, and a community shop. The community shop was opened in 2000 and is supported by up to 90 volunteers who help to run it.

The Plough Inn is a public house that is located in a 17th century farmhouse. Another two public houses, the Thatched Tavern and the Three Horseshoes, have since closed and been converted into private houses, but retain their names.

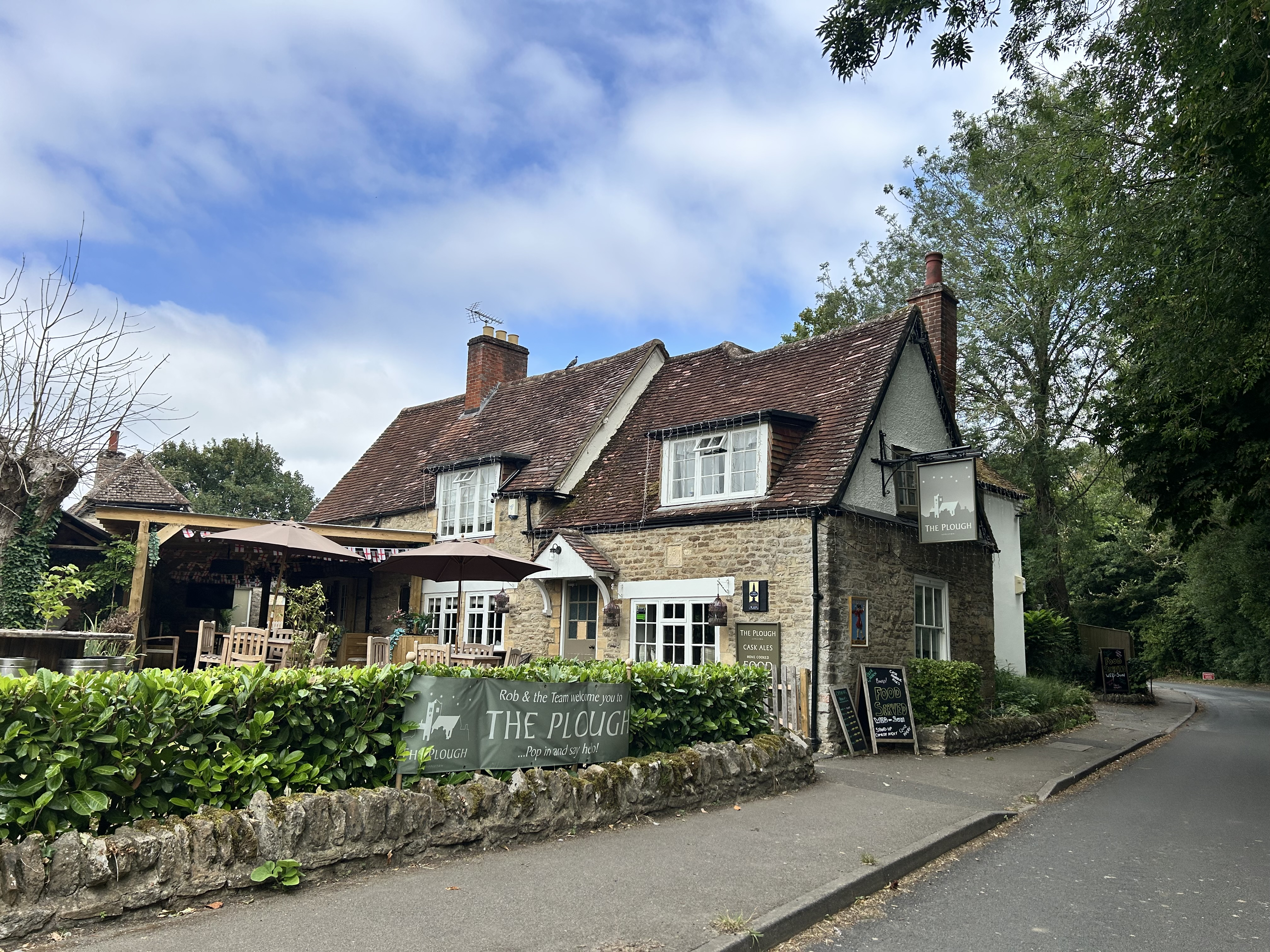
The Plough Inn

== Recreation ==
Jubilee Park is a sports ground and play area which was opened in 2012 to commemorate the Queen's Diamond Jubilee. The Appleton with Eaton Tennis Club has its grounds next to the park.

Appleton Sportsfield is a five acre sports ground located along Netherton Road, it is used by Appleton Cricket Club. Appleton All Stars Football Club was the local football team and was a member of the North Berks Football League. However, the club was dissolved in 2014.

== Public transport ==
Oxfordshire County Council subsidised bus route 63 between Oxford and Southmoor serves Appleton five times a day in each direction from Monday to Friday. There is no service on Saturday, Sunday, or Bank Holidays. The current contractor operating the route is Thames Travel.

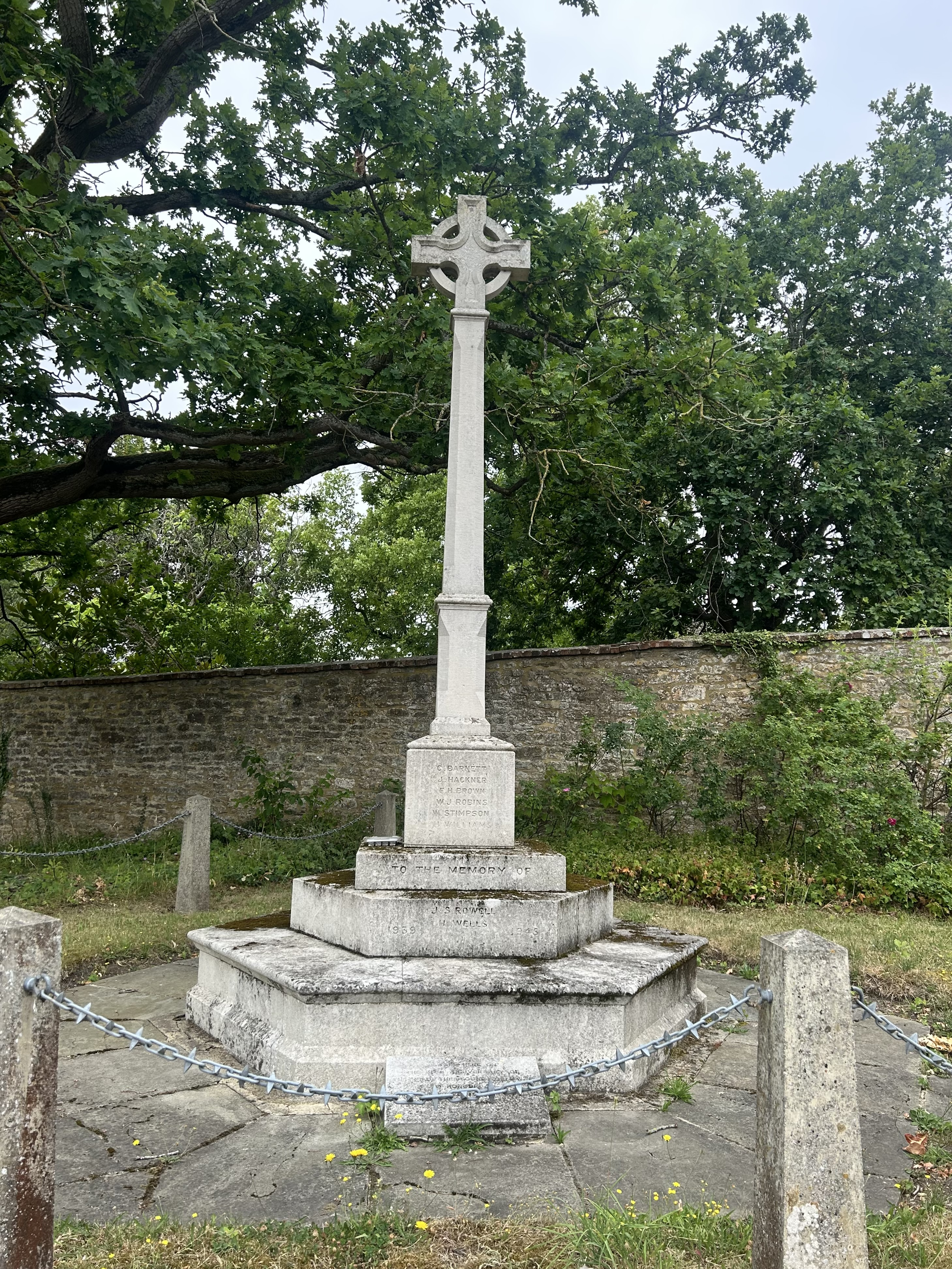
War Memorial, Appleton, Oxfordshire

== Notable people ==
Elinor Fettiplace lived at Appleton Manor and is known for her Receipt Book which is a collection of recipes written down by her in around 1604 but which were not published until 1986.

== Sources ==
- Page, William; Ditchfield, PH, eds. (1924). A History of the County of Berkshire. Victoria County History. Vol. IV. assisted by John Hautenville Cope. London: The St Katherine Press. pp. 335–341.
- Pevsner, Nikolaus (1966). Berkshire. The Buildings of England. Harmondsworth: Penguin Books. pp. 65–66.
- Saint, Andrew (1970). "Three Oxford Architects". Oxoniensia. XXXV. Oxfordshire Architectural and Historical Society: 53ff. Archived from the original on 28 September 2007.
