= Hilary Spurling =

British writer (born 1940)

Hilary Spurling CBE FRSL
- Born: Susan Hilary Forrest; 25 December 1940 (age 85); Stockport, Cheshire, England
- Education: Somerville College, Oxford
- Occupation: Writer
- Spouse: John Spurling (m. 1961)
- Awards: Rose Mary Crawshay Prize; Duff Cooper Prize; Whitbread Prize; James Tait Black Memorial Prize

Susan Hilary Spurling CBE FRSL(née Forrest; born 25 December 1940) is an English journalist and biographer. She is the recipient of a number of accolades.

== Early life and education ==
Born in Stockport, Cheshire, to circuit judge Gilbert Alexander Forrest (1912–1977) and teacher Emily Maureen, daughter of Joseph Armstrong, of Fivemiletown, County Tyrone, Spurling was educated at Clifton High School, an independent school in Bristol, South-West England, and then at Somerville College, Oxford.

== Career ==
Spurling won the Whitbread Prize for the second volume of her biography of Henri Matisse in January 2006. Burying The Bones: Pearl Buck in China was published in March 2010.

== Personal life ==
In 1961, she married playwright John Spurling. The couple have three children (Amy, Nathaniel, and Gilbert).

== Works ==
- Ivy When Young: The Early Life of Ivy Compton-Burnett 1884–1919 (1974)
- Mervyn Peake: Drawings (1974), editor
- Invitation to the Dance: A Handbook to Anthony Powell's A Dance to the Music of Time (1977)
- Secrets of a Woman's Heart: The Later Life of Ivy Compton-Burnett 1920–1969 (1984)
- Elinor Fettiplace's Receipt Book: Elizabethan Country House Cooking (1986)
- Paul Scott: A Life (1990)
- Paper Spirits. Collage Portraits by Vladimir Sulyagin (1992), introduction
- Ivy: The Life of I. Compton-Burnett (1995; combines two volumes originally published separately in 1974 and 1984)
- The Unknown Matisse: Volume 1 – A Life of Henri Matisse 1869–1908 (1998)
- La Grande Thérèse: The Greatest Swindle of the Century (1999) on Thérèse Humbert
- The Girl from the Fiction Department: A Portrait of Sonia Orwell (2002)
- Matisse the Master: The Conquest of Colour 1909–1954 (2005)
- Ann Stokes: Artists' Potter (contributor) (2009)
- Matisse: The Life (abridged version of two earlier works) (2009)
- Burying the Bones: Pearl Buck in China (2010)
- Anthony Powell: Dancing to the Music of Time (2017)

== Awards ==
- 1976, Rose Mary Crawshay Prize for Ivy When Young: The Early Life of Ivy Compton-Burnett 1884–1919
- 1984, Duff Cooper Prize for Ivy When Young: The Early Life of Ivy Compton-Burnett 1884–1919
- 2005, Whitbread Book of the Year award for Matisse the Master: The Conquest of Colour 1909–1954
- 2005, elected Fellow of the Royal Society of Literature
- 2010, James Tait Black Memorial Prize for biography, for Burying the Bones: Pearl Buck in China

Awards and achievements
| Preceded by Winifred Gérin | Rose Mary Crawshay Prize; 1967 | Succeeded by Christine Alexander; Gillian Beer |
