= Fettiplace baronets =

Extinct baronetcy in the Baronetage of England

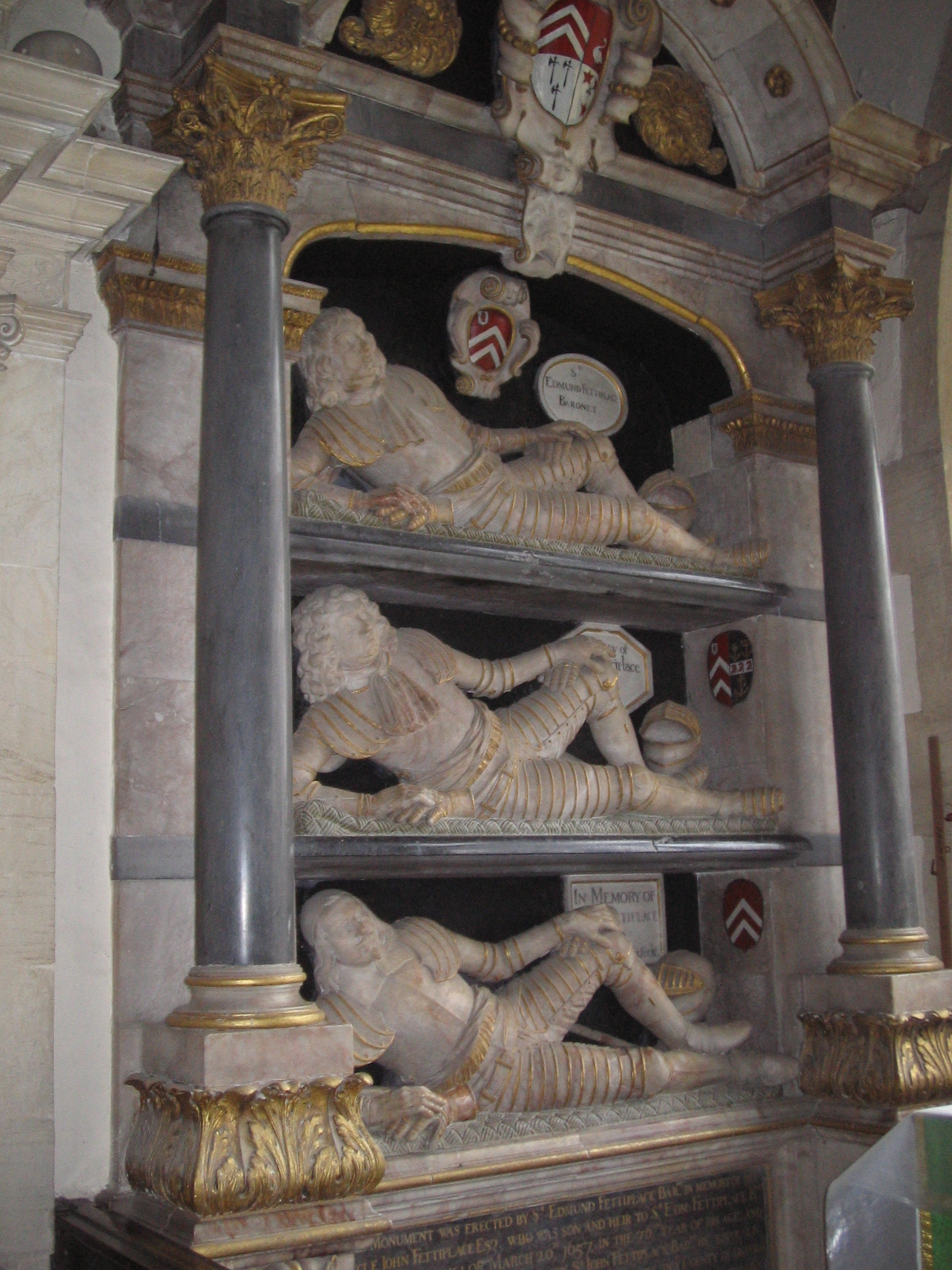
One of the Fettiplace monuments in St Mary the Virgin parish church in Swinbrook

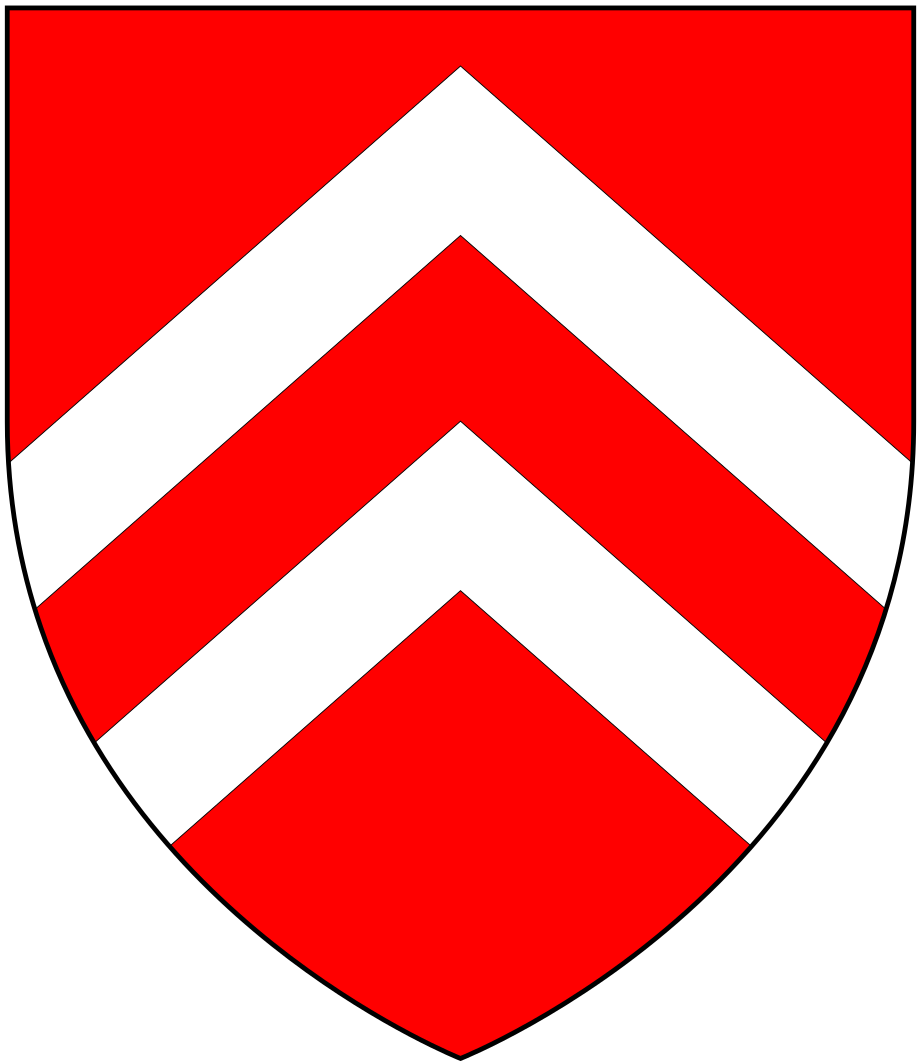
Arms of Fettiplace: Gules, two chevrons argent

The Fettiplace Baronetcy, of Childrey in the County of Berkshire (now Oxfordshire), was a title in the Baronetage of England. It was created on 30 March 1661 for John Fettiplace as a reward for the support given by members of the family, particularly John's uncles John and Edmund, to the Royalist cause in the English Civil War. The title became extinct on the death of the fifth Baronet in 1743.

Their highly unusual tomb in Swinbrook Parish Church was carved by William Bird of Oxford in 1686.

== Fettiplace baronets, of Childrey (1661) ==
- Sir John Fettiplace, 1st Baronet (died 1672)
- Sir Edmund Fettiplace, 2nd Baronet (c. 1654–1707)
- Sir Charles Fettiplace, 3rd Baronet (died 1713)
- Sir Lorenzo Fettiplace, 4th Baronet (c. 1662–1725)
- Sir George Fettiplace, 5th Baronet (1668–1743)
