= Asthall barrow =

Archaeological site in Oxfordshire, England

Coordinates: 51°47′20″N 01°34′52″W

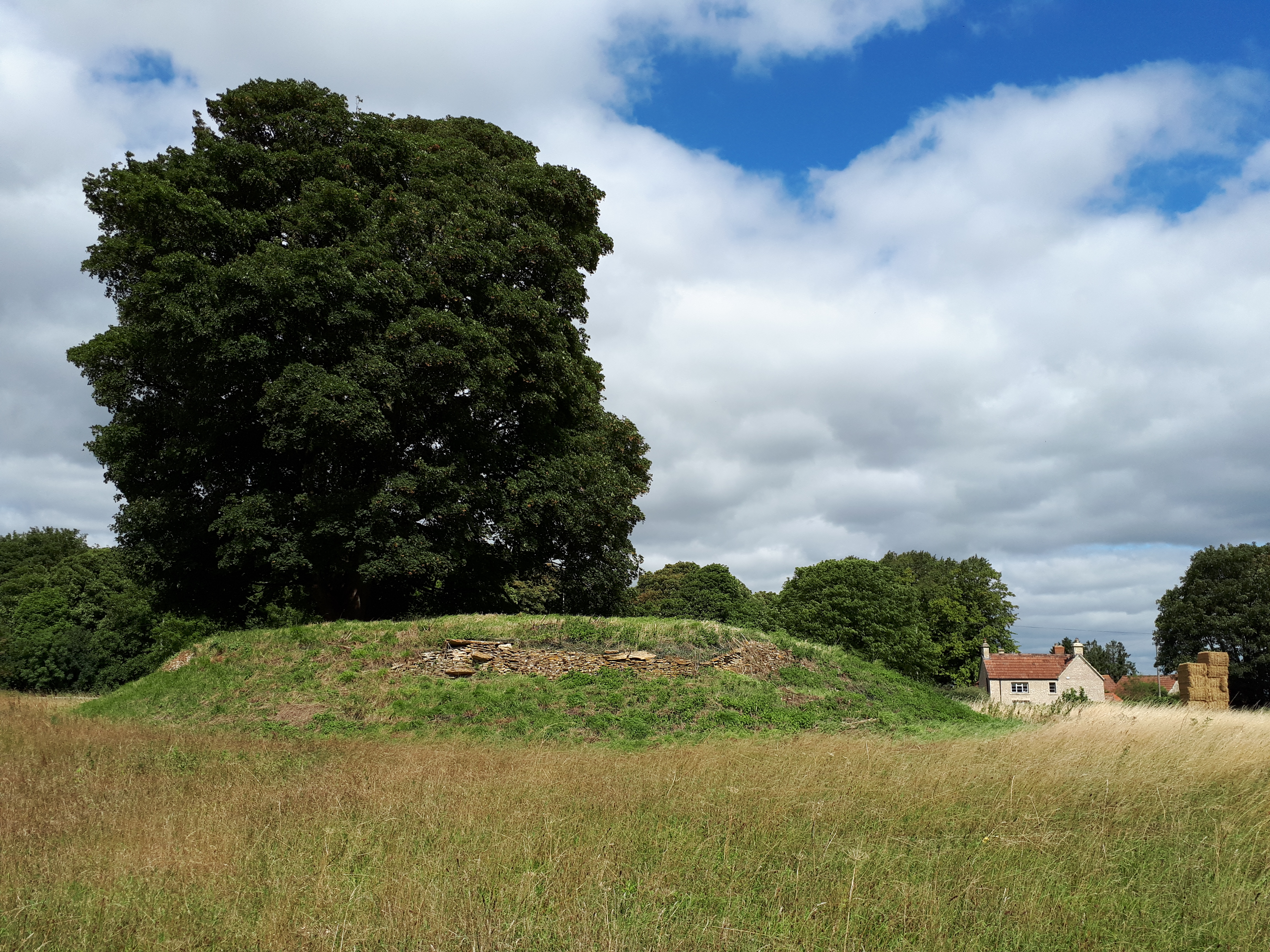
Asthall barrow

Asthall barrow is a high-status Anglo-Saxon burial mound from the seventh century AD. It is located in Asthall, Oxfordshire, and was excavated in 1923 and 1924.

== Location ==
Asthall barrow is located along the strip of the A40 connecting the towns of Witney and Burford; it is immediately north of the A40 where it connects to Burford road, and just south of the byroad leading off Burford to Asthall and Swinbrook. The barrow is prominently located. It sits by Akeman Street where the Roman road crossed the River Windrush, the site of a one-time Roman settlement. It has expansive views, and overlooks the Thames Valley from Lechlade to Wytham Hill. To the north it looks out at Leafield barrow; to the south appears Faringdon Hill and beyond it the Berkshire Downs at White Horse Hill, while to the southeast Sinodun Hill near Dorchester appears, with the Chilterns in the distance. The barrow gives its name to surrounding structures, such as Barrow Plantation, Barrow Farmhouse, and Asthall Barrow Roundabout.

== Architecture ==
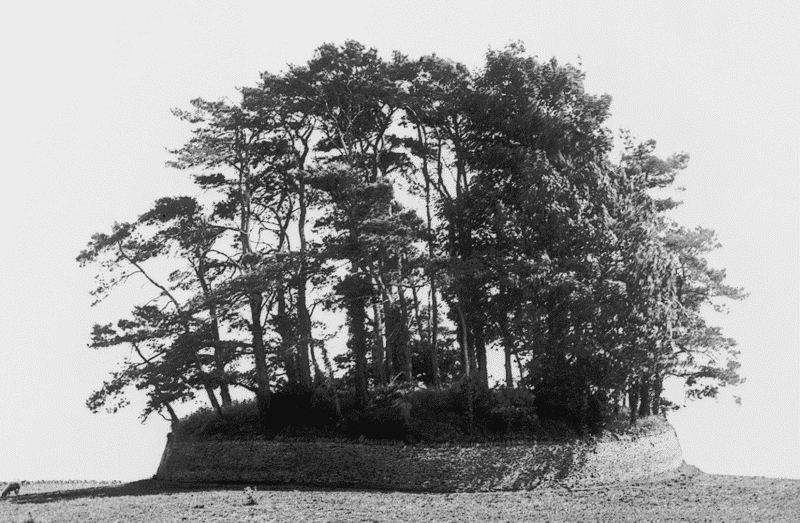
The barrow in 1895, photographed by Henry Taunt

The barrow stands 2.4 m (7 ft 10 in) high, and is about 55 ft (17 m) in diameter. It was recorded as 8 ft 6 in (2.6 m) high around 1907, but, in 1923, as 12 ft (3.7 m) high. It is surrounded by a 4 ft 6 in (1.37 m) high dry stone retaining wall. Once covered in trees including beeches and firs, likely planted in the nineteenth century, the barrow is now topped by a single, prominent sycamore; the remaining growth was removed during conservation work in 2017 or 2018. The presence of Romano–British grey wares in the barrow's soil, like the downward sloping surrounding land, suggests that the barrow may have been constructed by scraping up the surrounding topsoil. The land around the barrow is cultivated up to its edges, and in 1992 was planted with barley crops.

Originally the barrow probably stood larger; in 1923 an elliptical section surrounding the southwest circumference was recorded as approximately 4 in (10 cm) higher than the field, suggesting that it was once a part of the barrow. That the barrow's finds were not in the centre of its present dimensions also suggests that its original dimensions were somewhat different. Slippage of the barrow's soil may also help explain the changed dimensions, and the recorded reduction in height over time.

== Excavation ==
Diagram of Asthall barrow

The barrow was excavated in August 1923, and again in 1924, by George Bowles, the brother-in-law of the second Baron Redesdale, who owned the land. Permission to excavate had been unsuccessfully sought in 1872, on behalf of George Rolleston. The 1923 excavation was overseen by Bowles, although actually carried out by Tom Arnold and five helpers. Bowles was also aided by Edward Thurlow Leeds, then assistant keeper at the University of Oxford's Ashmolean Museum; Leeds offered suggestions, visited the site, and published the main discoveries. He published the 1923 excavation along with an excavation plot by Bowles in The Antiquaries Journal in April 1924, and briefly discussed the 1924 excavation 15 years later in a chapter of A History of Oxfordshire. Both excavations are also plotted, probably by Leeds, on a piece of blue linen held by the Ashmolean.

Bowles dug an irregular, seven-cornered polygonal trench in 1923, and in 1924 added a rectangular trench to its side, along with four 18-inch-square trenches in the area of the raised surrounding soil. He began by sinking a shaft 12 feet square and 12 feet deep; to this he added several extensions, each to the level of the field or below. He labeled the corners A–H on his plot, omitting the F. Bowles determined the barrow to be undisturbed and to consist of earth mixed with stones, along with the occasional sherd of Romano–British pottery. (Note: Bowles, whose daughter described him as a "gentleman amateur", may not be an authoritative voice for the idea that the barrow was hitherto intact. Likewise, one of several explanations for the wide and seemingly random distribution of objects within is that the barrow had previously been opened. Absent a re-excavation, Bowles's claim is thus uncertain.) The surface level was coated in yellowish clay, perhaps brought up from the River Windrush nearby. This faded away toward corner B, Bowles noted, but was prevalent around corner G, the southern limit of the excavation. Atop the clay Bowles found an abundance of charcoal and ashes, six inches thick in places (such as at point V on his plot), and forming only a thin covering elsewhere. Bowles also recorded a large charred timber, between points G and H.

== Grave goods ==
The barrow contained a large assemblage of items, of a quality indicating the high-status nature of the burial. There were at least seven vessels: three of pottery (a Merovingian wheel-made bottle and two hand-made jars), a small silver bowl or cup, a cast copper-alloy Byzantine bowl, a copper-alloy vessel identified primarily by a single fragment, and various copper-alloy fragments that suggest at least one other vessel. Fragments of foil, five of which were stamped with zoomorphic interlace patterns, suggest the burial of a decorated drinking horn, and a pear-shaped mount was both patterned and gilded. Other items appear to have been made of bone, and were likely pieces from a gaming set. The finds were donated to the Ashmolean, where they were given the accession numbers 1923.769–782, and 1949.297.

Accession	Image	Category	Description	Material	Dimensions	Notes	References
1923.769	Black and white photograph of a reconstructed bottle	Vessel	Merovingian wheel-made bottle	Pottery	247mm (h); 168mm (d)		
1923.770	Black and white line drawing of a hand-made pot	Vessel	Hand-made pot		125mm (h); 110mm (d)		
1923.771	Black and white line drawing of a hand-made pot	Vessel	Hand-made pot		115mm (h); 127mm (d)		
1923.778	Two small metal fragments	Vessel	Bowl or cup	Silver		13+ heavily oxidised fragments, including rim and body pieces	
1923.776	Black and white photograph of a hinge-loop from a Byzantine bowl	Vessel	Byzantine bowl	Cast copper alloy		4+ fragments, including rim, hinge-loop, and foot-ring	
1923.779	Black and white photograph of a body fragment from a bowl or cauldron	Vessel	Bowl or cauldron	Copper alloy		Unburnt sheet-metal body fragment; rim fragment from same or similar vessel	
1923.779		Vessel	Fittings for drinking horn(s), bottle(s), or cup(s)	Copper alloy		Sheet metal including repoussé foils decorated in Salin Style II and/or with billeted border, fluted binding strips with dome-headed rivets and U-sectioned rim-edge bindings	
1923.779		Vessel	Vessel	Copper alloy	3–3.5mm (d)	Several fragments of sheet metal with one edge rolled into a narrow tube	
1923.774	Black and white photograph of a strap end	Strap fittings	Strap end	Cast copper alloy	41mm (l); 19mm (w)	Mineralized textile on back. Conserved in 1972.	
1923.775		Strap fittings	Looped strap tab	Cast copper alloy	35mm (l); 11mm (w); 13mm (d)	Discovered during conservation work in 1966	
1923.777	Black and white photograph of a hinged strap attachment	Strap fittings	Hinged strap attachment	Cast copper alloy	22mm (l); 14.5mm (w)	Includes iron hinge-pin	
1923.779		Strap fittings	Looped strap mount	Cast copper alloy	12.5mm (l); 13mm (w)		
1923.775	Black and white photograph of an openwork swivel suspension fitting	Strap fittings	Openwork swivel suspension fitting	Cast copper alloy	Openwork cuboid, 12.5mm (l), 9mm (w); swivel loop, 20mm (l); looped strap tab, 19.5mm (l), 6mm (w)	Conserved in 1967.	
1923.779		Strap fittings	Disc-headed rivets		8mm (d); 5mm (l)	3 fragments. Heads decorated with concentric rings	
1923.773	Black and white photograph of a pear-shaped mount	Strap fittings	Pear-shaped mount	Cast copper alloy; gilt	47mm (l) (reconstructed)	Salin Style II on front; two cast-in-one disc-ended rivets on back	
1923.782	Black and white photograph of fragmentary game counters	Gaming set	Counters	Bone	30mm (d); 4mm (h)	26 fragments, plano-convex	
1949.297		Gaming set	Die	Antler	14mm cube		
1923.779		Unassignable items	Rectangular-headed rivet	Silver	Head, 6.7mm (l), 5mm (w); shank, 7mm (l)		
1923.779		Unassignable items	Disc	Lead	17mm (d); 4.3mm (th)	Bevelled edge	
1923.779	Black and white photograph of a strap mount	Unassignable items	"Silver" strap mount	Copper alloy	19mm (l) (extant); 6mm (w)	Cast. Two rivets on back corroded green; front gray.	
1923.779	Black and white photograph of a crescentic stud	Unassignable items	Two crescentic studs	Copper alloy	15mm (d)	Decorated with punched triangles. Rivet on back.	
1923.779	Black and white photograph of a sunken-field stud	Unassignable items	Sunken-field stud	Copper alloy	10.5mm (d); 2.5mm (h); shank 8mm (l)	Cast. Dome-headed rivet passes through centre of sunken field and bent flat on underside.	
1923.779		Unassignable items	Disc-headed rivet	Copper alloy	6.5mm (d); shank 5.5mm (l) (extant)	Plain	
1923.779		Unassignable items	Dome-headed rivet pin	Copper alloy	3.3mm (d); 9.5mm (l); shank 8.5mm (l)		
1923.779		Unassignable items	Relief-decorated disc or ring	Copper alloy	15mm (l); 14mm (w)	Cast. Fragment with thickened edge and hint of curvature. Notched ridge border and Salin Style I zoomorphic field.	
1923.779		Unassignable items	Plain disc	Copper alloy	23mm (d)	Irregular surface	
1923.779		Unassignable items	Unidentified fragments	Copper alloy		Constitutes the majority of the material catalogued under 1923.779. Includes sandwiched foil fragments, pieces covered with/incorporating corrosion products, charcoal and soil, generally thicker than the foils, and globules of melted metal. May come from the copper-alloy vessels or unassignable items.	
1923.779		Unassignable items	"Nails"	Iron	11.5–22mm (l)	4 fragments	
1923.780	Black and white photograph of fragmentary pieces of bone	Unassignable items	Inlays?	Bone	4–5mm, 15mm (w)	55 fragments with flat rectangular or slightly plano-convex section, most with plain outer surface and grooved or cross-grooved inner surface, some also with grooved outer surface, and two with cross-hatched edges	
1923.781	Black and white photograph of fragmentary rod-like items	Unassignable items	"Rods"	Bone	46mm (l) (max); 6.5mm (d) (max)	11 fragments, slightly curved and tapered	
n/a		Cremated bone	Four finger bones; fragments of jaw; roots of canine and lower molar	Human bone			
n/a		Cremated bone	Left tibia; right lateral cuneiform; sesamoid; likely metatarsal	horse bone			
n/a		Cremated bone	Astragalus; possible tail vertebrae; skull fragments	sheep bone			
1923.772		From barrow make-up	Romano–British pottery sherds			Worn residual material	

== Conservation ==
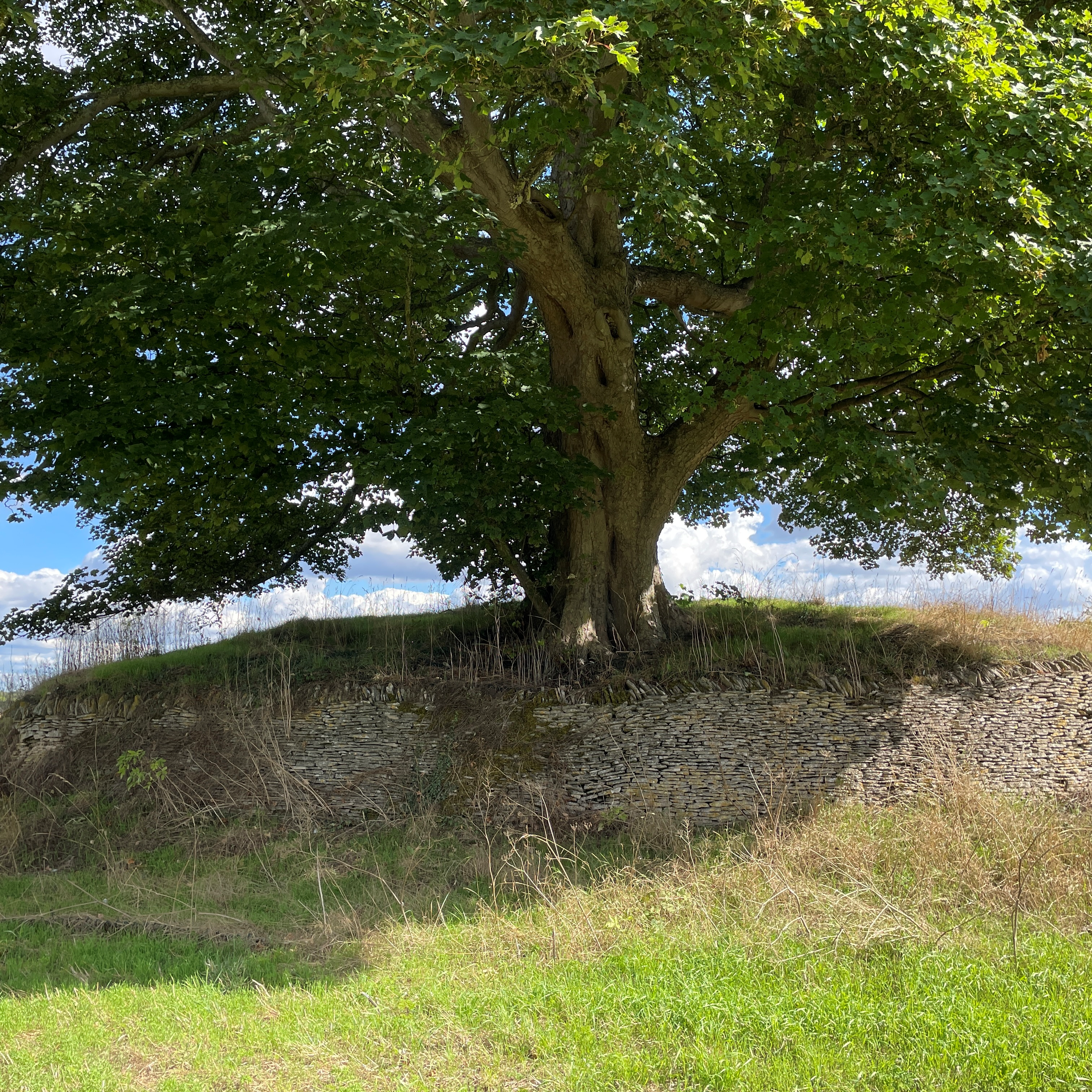
The stone wall surrounding the barrow

The Asthall barrow was designated a scheduled monument on 16 May 1934. Historic England, which maintains the list of such monuments, noted that the barrow "is one of the best preserved examples of a type of burial mound of which there are about ten examples in West Oxfordshire", and that "[d]espite partial excavation and recent animal burrowing it will contain archaeological and environmental evidence relating to its construction and the landscape in which it was built." Historic England added that the "survival of part of its original drystone retaining wall is an unusual feature", but that regardless, "[a]s a rare monument class all positively identified examples are considered worthy of preservation."

In 2009, the barrow was added to Historic England's "Heritage At Risk Register", a project intended to identify and protect historic sites threatened by neglect, decay, or development. The 2009 list was the first to include scheduled monuments that are archaeological sites; previous iterations had included only listed buildings, structural scheduled monuments, registered battlefields, and protected wreck sites. The barrow remained on the at-risk register through 2017. From 2009 to 2014, its condition was described as "declining" and "generally unsatisfactory with major localised problems," and its principal vulnerability was given as scrub and tree growth. Its principal vulnerability was changed to collapse by 2015, although by 2016 its condition was upgraded to "improving." In 2017, the barrow's final year on the register, its principal vulnerability was given as extensive rabbit burrowing. The barrow was listed as "saved" and removed from the register the following year, following removal of trees and scrub, and work to exclude rabbits; the large sycamore tree atop the barrow was left in place. The work was done in partnership with the owners, and voluntary wardens from the Cotswolds Area of Outstanding Natural Beauty.

== Bibliography ==
- "Asthall". History, Gazetteer, and Directory of Berkshire and Oxfordshire, with an Excellent Map of Each County. London: Edward Cassey and Co. 1868. pp. 14–15.
- "Asthall Barrow - an Anglo-Saxon Burial". Ashmolean Museum. Archived from the original on 18 July 2017.
- Brown, David (1990). "Dice, a games-board, and playing pieces". In Biddle, Martin (ed.). Object and Economy in Medieval Winchester. Winchester Studies. Vol. 7.ii. Oxford: Oxford University Press. pp. 692–706. ISBN 0-19-813175-5.
- Bruce-Mitford, Rupert (1978). The Sutton Hoo Ship-Burial, Volume 2: Arms, Armour and Regalia. London: British Museum Publications. ISBN 0-7141-1335-2.
- Bruce-Mitford, Rupert (1983). The Sutton Hoo Ship-Burial, Volume 3: Late Roman and Byzantine Silver, Hanging-Bowls, Drinking Vessels, Cauldrons and Other Containers, Textiles, the Lyre, Pottery Bottle and Other Items. Vol. II. London: British Museum Publications Limited. ISBN 0-7141-0530-9.
- Colvin, Christina; Cragoe, Carol; Ortenberg, Veronica; Peberdy, Robert B.; Selwyn, Nesta & Williamson, Elizabeth (2006). "Asthall: Introduction". In Townley, Simon (ed.). A History of Oxfordshire. The Victoria History of the Counties of England. Vol. XV. London: Institute of Historical Research. pp. 37–48. Archived from the original on 26 January 2026.
- Colvin, Christina; Cragoe, Carol; Ortenberg, Veronica; Peberdy, Robert B.; Selwyn, Nesta & Williamson, Elizabeth (2006). "Asthall: Economic History". In Townley, Simon (ed.). A History of Oxfordshire. The Victoria History of the Counties of England. Vol. XV. London: Institute of Historical Research. pp. 55–64. Archived from the original on 26 January 2026.
- Davies, Wendy & Vierck, Hayo (December 1974). "The Contexts of Tribal Hidage: Social Aggregates and Settlement Patterns". Frühmittelalterliche Studien. 2: 223–302. doi:10.1515/9783110242072.223. S2CID 201729051.
- Dickinson, Tania M. (October 1976). The Anglo-Saxon Burial Sites of the Upper Thames Region, and their Bearing on the History of Wessex, Circa AD 400–700 (Ph.D.). Vol. I. University of Oxford.
- Dickinson, Tania M. (October 1976). The Anglo-Saxon Burial Sites of the Upper Thames Region, and their Bearing on the History of Wessex, Circa AD 400–700 (Ph.D.). Vol. II. University of Oxford.
- Dickinson, Tania M. (October 1976). The Anglo-Saxon Burial Sites of the Upper Thames Region, and their Bearing on the History of Wessex, Circa AD 400–700 (Ph.D.). Vol. III. University of Oxford.
- Dickinson, Tania M. & Speake, George (1992). "The Seventh-Century Cremation Burial in Asthall Barrow, Oxfordshire: A Reassessment". In Carver, Martin (ed.). The Age of Sutton Hoo: The seventh century in north-western Europe. Woodbridge: The Boydell Press. pp. 95–130. ISBN 0-85115-330-5.
- Fox, Cyril (October 1924). "A Jug of the Anglo-Saxon Period". The Antiquaries Journal. IV (4). Society of Antiquaries of London: 371–374. doi:10.1017/S0003581500006168. S2CID 163791758.
- "Heritage at Risk 2018". Historic England. 8 November 2018.
- Historic England. "Asthall Barrow: an Anglo-Saxon burial mound 100m SSW of Barrow Farm (1008414)". National Heritage List for England.
- Leeds, E. Thurlow (April 1924). "An Anglo-Saxon Cremation-burial of the Seventh Century in Asthall Barrow, Oxfordshire". The Antiquaries Journal. IV (2). Society of Antiquaries of London: 113–126. doi:10.1017/S0003581500005552. S2CID 161746919.
- Leeds, E. Thurlow (1939). "Anglo-Saxon Remains". In Salzman, Louis Francis (ed.). A History of Oxfordshire. The Victoria History of the Counties of England. Vol. I. London: Archibald Constable and Company. pp. 346–372.
- MacGregor, Arthur & Bolick, Ellen (1993). "A Summary Catalogue of the Anglo-Saxon Collections (Non-Ferrous Metals)". British Archaeological Reports. 230. ISBN 978-0860547518.
- Manning, Percy (April 1898). "Notes on the Archæology of Oxford and its Neighbourhood". The Berks, Bucks & Oxon Archæological Journal. 4 (1). Berkshire Archaeological Society: 9–10.
- Meaney, Audrey (1964). A Gazetteer of Early Anglo-Saxon Burial Sites. London: George Allen & Unwin.
- Myres, J. N. L. (1977a). A Corpus of Anglo-Saxon Pottery of the Pagan Period. Vol. 1. Cambridge: Cambridge University Press. ISBN 0-521-21285-5. LCCN 76-11088.
- Myres, J. N. L. (1977b). A Corpus of Anglo-Saxon Pottery of the Pagan Period. Vol. 2. Cambridge: Cambridge University Press. ISBN 0-521-21285-5. LCCN 76-11088.
- Parfitt, Clare & Whimster, Rowan, eds. (June 2009). Heritage at Risk Register 2009: South East. London: English Heritage. Archived from the original on 5 April 2024.
  - Heritage at Risk Register 2010: South East. London: English Heritage. July 2010. Archived from the original on 29 March 2024.
  - Heritage at Risk Register 2011: South East. London: English Heritage. October 2011. Archived from the original on 14 August 2021.
  - Heritage at Risk Register 2012: South East. London: English Heritage. September 2012. Archived from the original on 14 August 2021.
  - Heritage at Risk Register 2013: South East. London: English Heritage. October 2013. Archived from the original on 16 March 2022.
  - Heritage at Risk Register 2014: South East. London: English Heritage. October 2014. Archived from the original on 14 August 2021.
  - Heritage at Risk: South East Register 2015. London: English Heritage. October 2015. Archived from the original on 5 April 2024.
  - Heritage at Risk: South East Register 2016. London: English Heritage. October 2016. Archived from the original on 5 April 2024.
  - Heritage at Risk: South East Register 2017. London: English Heritage. October 2017. Archived from the original on 17 March 2022.
  - Heritage at Risk: South East Register 2018. London: English Heritage. November 2018. Archived from the original on 6 December 2023.
- Pickering, A. J. (April 1932). "A Hanging-bowl from Leicestershire". The Antiquaries Journal. XII (2). Society of Antiquaries of London: 174–175. doi:10.1017/S0003581500047235. S2CID 246043060.
- Potts, William (1907). "Ancient Earthworks". In Page, William (ed.). A History of Oxfordshire. The Victoria History of the Counties of England. Vol. II. London: Archibald Constable and Company. pp. 303–349.
- "Site Name: Asthall". Oxfordshire's Historic Archives. Ashmolean Museum. Archived from the original on 6 January 2026.
- Timby, Jane (January 1993). A40 Witney Bypass to Sturt Farm Improvement: Archaeological Survey (PDF). Cirencester: Cotswold Archaeological Trust. Archived (PDF) from the original on 19 November 2026.
- Williams, Howard (2006). Death and Memory in Early Medieval Britain. Cambridge Studies in Archaeology. Cambridge: Cambridge University Press. doi:10.1017/CBO9780511489594. ISBN 978-0-511-48959-4.
- Windle, Bertram (July 1901). "A Tentative List of Objects of Prehistoric and Early Historic Interest in the Counties of Berks, Bucks and Oxford". The Berks, Bucks & Oxon Archæological Journal. 7 (2). Berkshire Archaeological Society: 43–47.

=== Ashmolean collection pages ===
- "Belt-fitting". Ashmolean Museum.
- "Bottle". Ashmolean Museum. Archived from the original on 18 November 2026.
- "Fragment of fused bronze". Ashmolean Museum.
- "Fragment of fused bronze". Ashmolean Museum.
- "Fragments of fused bronze, including decorated pieces". Ashmolean Museum.
- "Fragments of fused bronze". Ashmolean Museum.
- "Gaming piece". Ashmolean Museum.
- "Inlay". Ashmolean Museum.
- "Ivory inlay". Ashmolean Museum.
- "Personal ornament". Ashmolean Museum.
- "Pieces of ivory inlay". Ashmolean Museum.
- "Shell and gaming pieces". Ashmolean Museum.
- "Silver objects". Ashmolean Museum.
- "Strap end". Ashmolean Museum. Archived from the original on 30 October 2026.
- "Suspension ring from hanging bowl". Ashmolean Museum.
- "Swivel attachment". Ashmolean Museum.
