= Swinbrook =

Village in Oxfordshire, England

Coordinates: 51.807°N 1.594°W

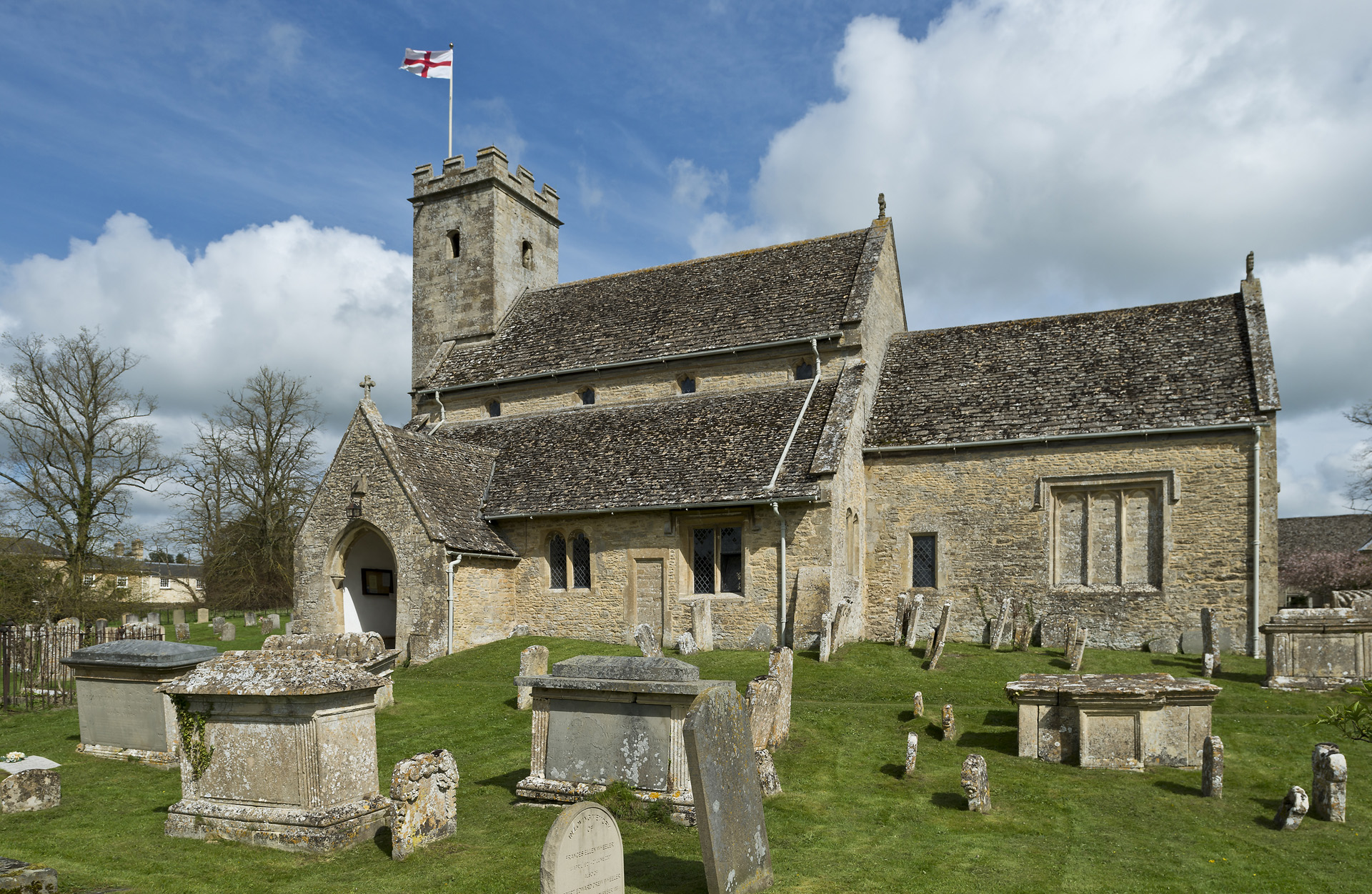
- St Mary the Virgin parish church

- Location within Oxfordshire
- Population: 139 (parish, with Widford) (2011 Census)
- OS grid reference: SP2812
- Civil parish: Swinbrook and Widford
- District: West Oxfordshire
- Shire county: Oxfordshire
- Region: South East
- Country: England
- Sovereign state: United Kingdom
- Post town: Burford
- Postcode district: OX18
- Dialling code: 01993
- Police: Thames Valley
- Fire: Oxfordshire
- Ambulance: South Central
- UK Parliament: Witney

Swinbrook is a village in the civil parish of Swinbrook and Widford, in the West Oxfordshire district of Oxfordshire, England. It is on the River Windrush, about 2 miles (3 km) east of Burford. Widford is a hamlet about 0.5 miles (800 m) west of Swinbrook. The 2011 Census recorded the population of Swinbrook and Widford as 139.

== History ==
The Church of England parish church of Saint Mary the Virgin dates from about 1200. Its unusual open-sided bell-tower was added in 1822. The church is noted for its 17th-century Fettiplace monuments; that of 1686 was carved by William Bird of Oxford. St Mary's also has a monument to the officers and men of the Royal Navy submarine HMS P514, and especially its commander, Lieutenant W. A. Phillimore, whose parents lived at Swinbrook. In 1942 P514 failed to identify herself to the Royal Canadian Navy minesweeper HMCS Georgian. The Canadian ship therefore assumed the submarine to be an enemy vessel and rammed P514, sinking her with the loss of all hands.

In 1926, David Freeman-Mitford, 2nd Baron Redesdale had Swinbrook House rebuilt 1.5 miles (2.4 km) north of the village. Four of his six daughters (the "Mitford sisters") are buried in the parish churchyard: Nancy, Unity, and Diana are buried side by side, while Pamela is buried northwest of the tower. There is a tablet in the church commemorating their only brother, Tom, killed in March 1945 in Burma. Max Mosley, son of Diana, is also buried in the churchyard.

Swinbrook was an ancient parish. In 1932 the parish was merged with Widford to form a new civil parish called Swinbrook and Widford, subject to some adjustment to the boundaries with the neighbouring parishes of Shilton and Asthal. At the 1931 census (the last before the abolition of the parish), Swinbrook had a population of 173.

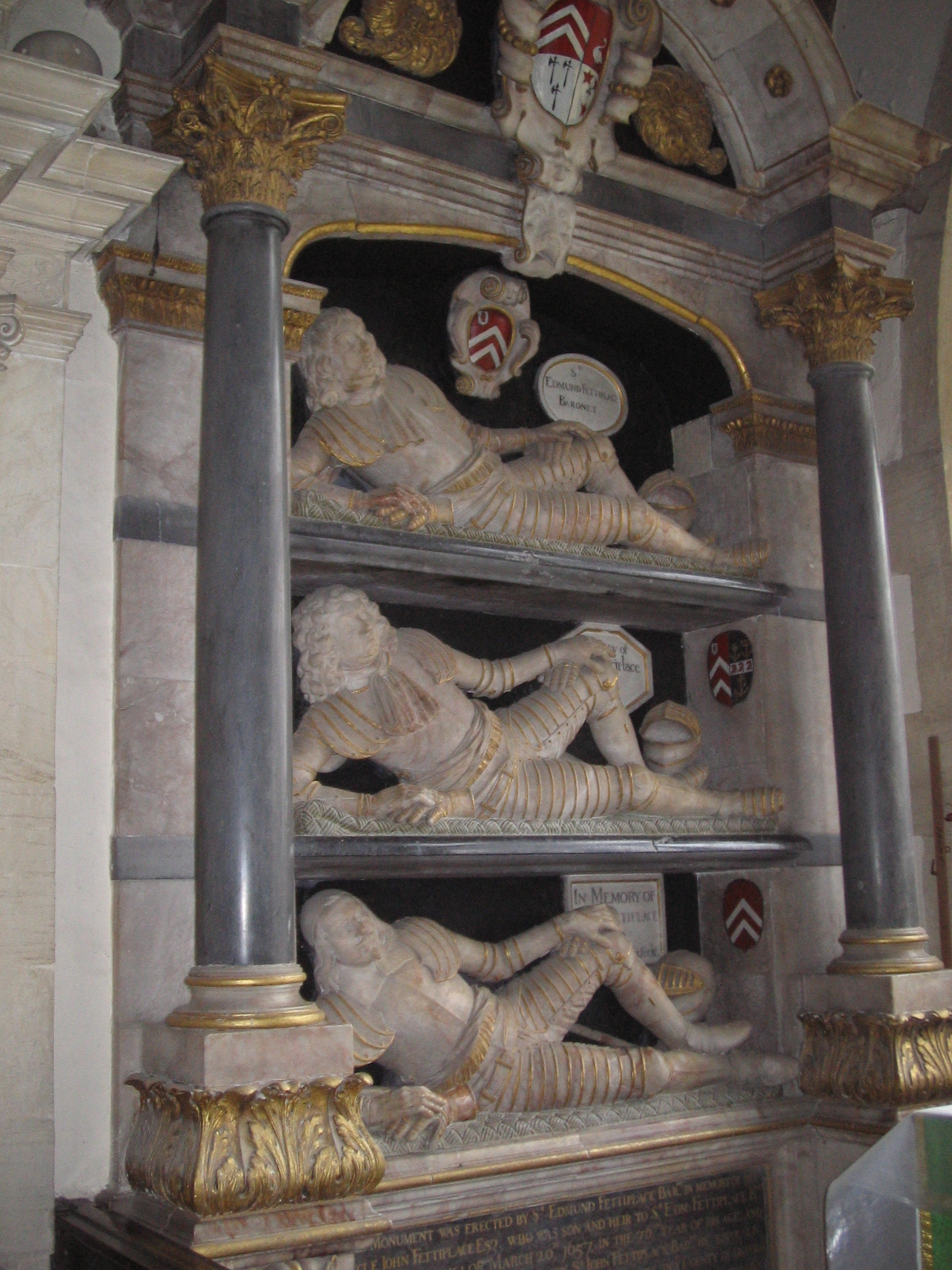
One of the Fettiplace monuments in St Mary the Virgin parish church

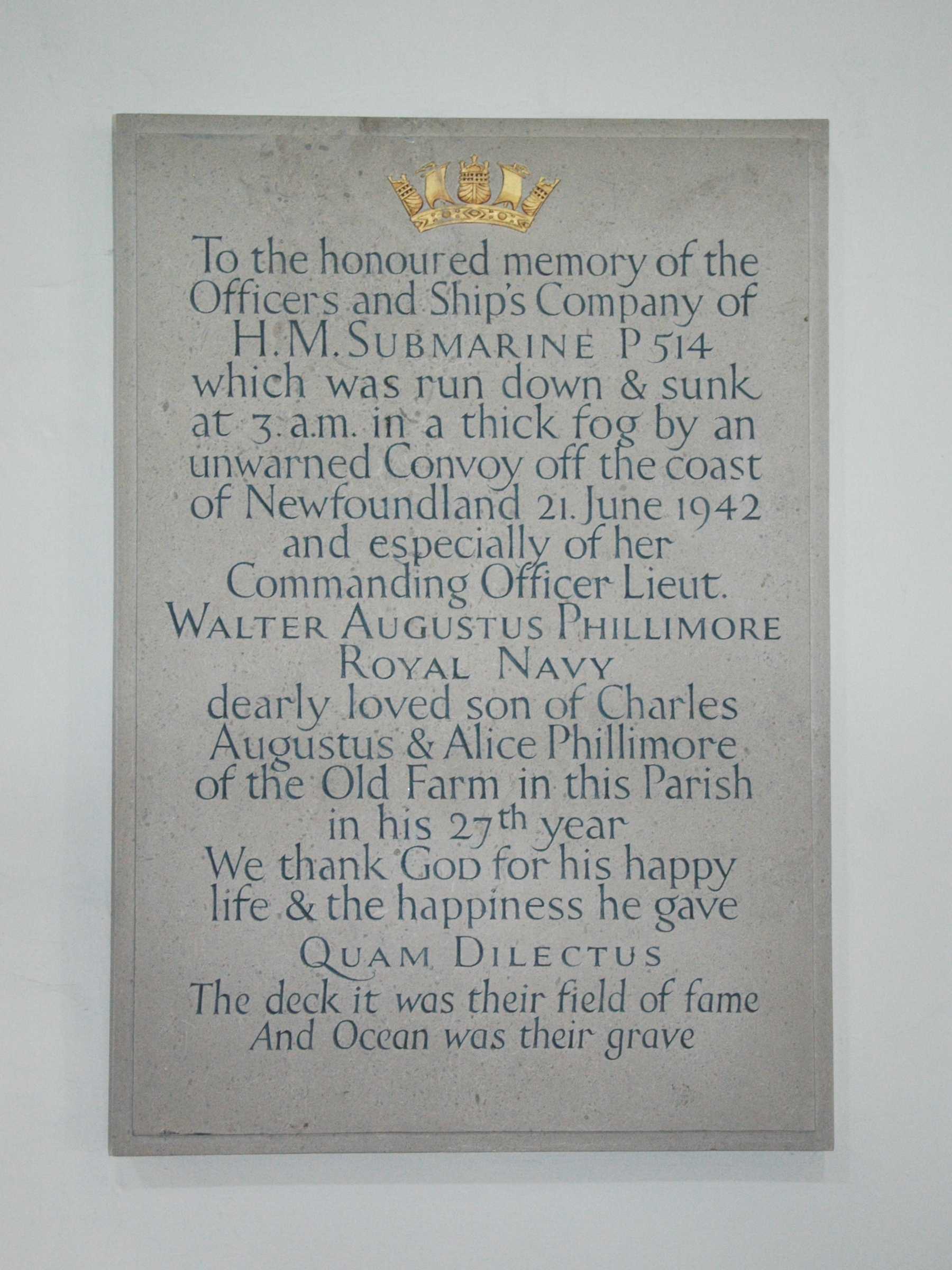
HMS P514 monument in St Mary the Virgin Church. Quam Dilectus translates as 'How beloved'.

== Amenities ==
Swinbrook Cricket Club has two teams. They play in division 5 and 10 respectively of the Oxfordshire Cricket Association.

== Sources and further reading ==
- Case, Humphrey (1958). "Swinbrook, Oxon". Oxoniensia. XXIII. Oxford Architectural and Historical Society: 138.
- Hinton, David A. (1971). "Medieval Pottery from Swinbrook, Oxon". Oxoniensia. XXXVI. Oxford Architectural and Historical Society: 107–110.
- Ottewell, Gordon (1999). Literary strolls around the Cotswolds and the Forest of Dean. Wilmslow: Sigma Leisure. p. 71. ISBN 1-85058-687-X.
- Pearson, Lynn F (2004). Discovering Famous Graves. Oxford: Shire Publications. p. 93. ISBN 0747806195.
- Sherwood, Jennifer; Pevsner, Nikolaus (1974). Oxfordshire. The Buildings of England. Harmondsworth: Penguin Books. pp. 799–800. ISBN 0-14-071045-0.
