= Barton, Gloucestershire =

Village in Gloucestershire, England

Coordinates: 51°55′36″N 1°51′48″W

Barton
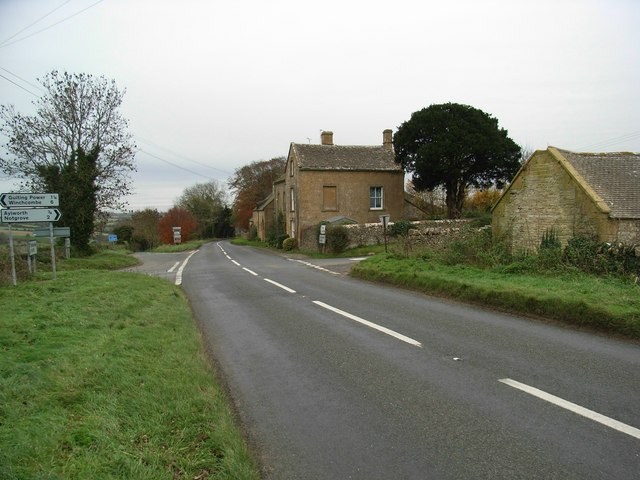

- Location within Gloucestershire
- Civil parish: Temple Guiting
- District: Cotswold
- Shire county: Gloucestershire
- Region: South West
- Country: England
- Sovereign state: United Kingdom
- Post town: Cheltenham
- Postcode district: GL54
- Police: Gloucestershire
- Fire: Gloucestershire
- Ambulance: South Western
- UK Parliament: North Cotswolds

Barton is a village in Gloucestershire, on the River Windrush, near Naunton. It appears in written records as Berton as early as 1287. The manor was acquired by the Knights Templar of Temple Guiting; in 1558 it was held by Maurice Rodney. In 1779 it was recorded as consisting of 7 houses and 44 inhabitants. At the beginning of the nineteenth century the manor was held by William Raikes of London and John Inglett-Fortescue of Dawlish, Devon.
