= Ford, Gloucestershire =

Hamlet in Gloucestershire, England

Coordinates: 51.963°N 1.874°W

Ford
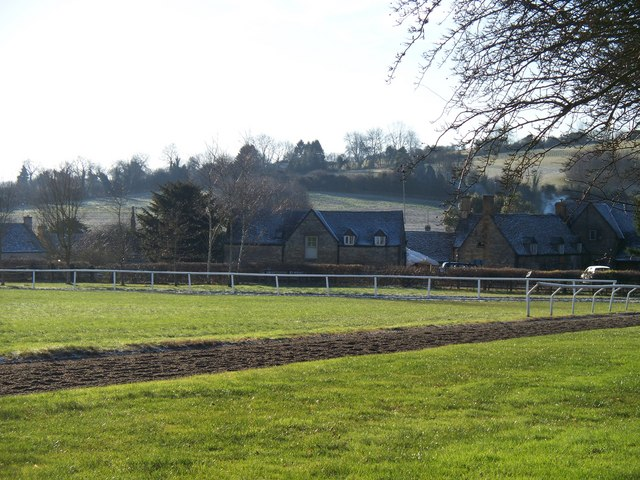
- Ford village

- Location within Gloucestershire
- Civil parish: Temple Guiting
- District: Cotswold
- Shire county: Gloucestershire
- Region: South West
- Country: England
- Sovereign state: United Kingdom
- Post town: Cheltenham
- Postcode district: GL54
- Police: Gloucestershire
- Fire: Gloucestershire
- Ambulance: South Western
- UK Parliament: North Cotswolds

Ford is a hamlet in Gloucestershire, England.

Ford lies on the B4077 road where it crosses the upper reaches of the River Windrush between Tewkesbury and Stow-on-the-Wold. The nearest village is Cutsdean a mile to its north.
