= Temple Guiting Preceptory =

English medieval monastic house

Coordinates: 51.941348°N 1.870508°W

Temple Guiting Preceptory was a medieval monastic house of the Knights Templar in Gloucestershire, England. It was founded around the middle of the twelfth century, receiving grants of land from Gilbert de Lacy and Roger de Waterville. Following the closure of the order in 1308–1309, the last preceptor of Guiting was sent to a monastery in the Diocese of Worcester with a small maintenance charge upon the lands of Temple Guiting.

There was a fulling mill established at Temple Guiting, Gloucestershire by 1185 which was documented in Domesday Book.
