= Widford, Oxfordshire =

Deserted village in Oxfordshire, England

Coordinates: 51.805°N 1.604°W

Widford
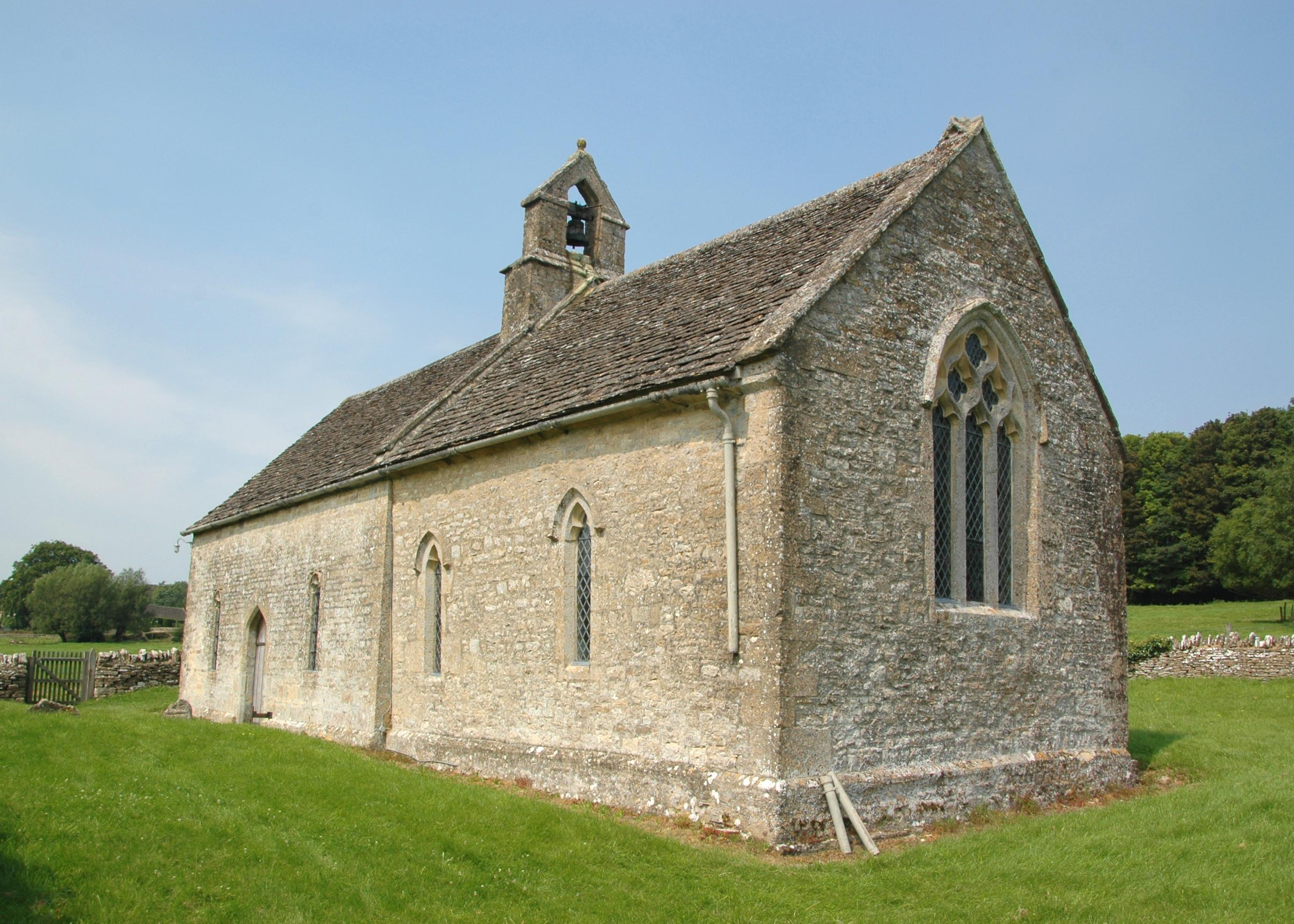
- St Oswald's Church

- Location within Oxfordshire
- OS grid reference: SP2712
- Civil parish: Swinbrook and Widford
- District: West Oxfordshire
- Shire county: Oxfordshire
- Region: South East
- Country: England
- Sovereign state: United Kingdom
- Post town: Burford
- Postcode district: OX18
- Dialling code: 01993
- Police: Thames Valley
- Fire: Oxfordshire
- Ambulance: South Central
- UK Parliament: Witney

Widford is a deserted medieval village in the civil parish of Swinbrook and Widford, in the West Oxfordshire district of Oxfordshire, England. It is on the River Windrush about 1.5 miles (2.4 km) east of Burford. The village was an exclave of Gloucestershire until 1844.

== History ==
Early occupation is evidenced by the remains of a Roman villa. The Church of England parish church of St Oswald stands on its site, and a small area of Roman mosaic was visible in its chancel, but has been moved to Corinium Museum in Cirencester. The Domesday Book of 1086 recorded that St Oswald's Priory, Gloucester held the manor of Widford. It was a detached part of Gloucestershire until the 19th century. St Oswald's church in Widford is Early English Gothic and was built in the 13th century. In the 14th century numerous wall paintings were added, remains of which survive. Most of the church's present windows were added in the 16th and 17th centuries.

Widford was a substantial village in the Middle Ages but today only the 16th-century manor house and a few other houses remain. St Oswald's stands in a field whose cropmarks show the outlines of former buildings. In 1844 the Counties (Detached Parts) Act 1844 transferred Widford to Oxfordshire. Widford was an ancient parish, but by 1931 its population was only 29. On 1 April 1932 the parish was merged with Swinbrook to form a new civil parish called Swinbrook and Widford, subject to some adjustment to the boundaries with the neighbouring parish of Shilton.

Vivian H. H. Green, historian, priest and former Rector of Lincoln College, Oxford, is buried in the churchyard.

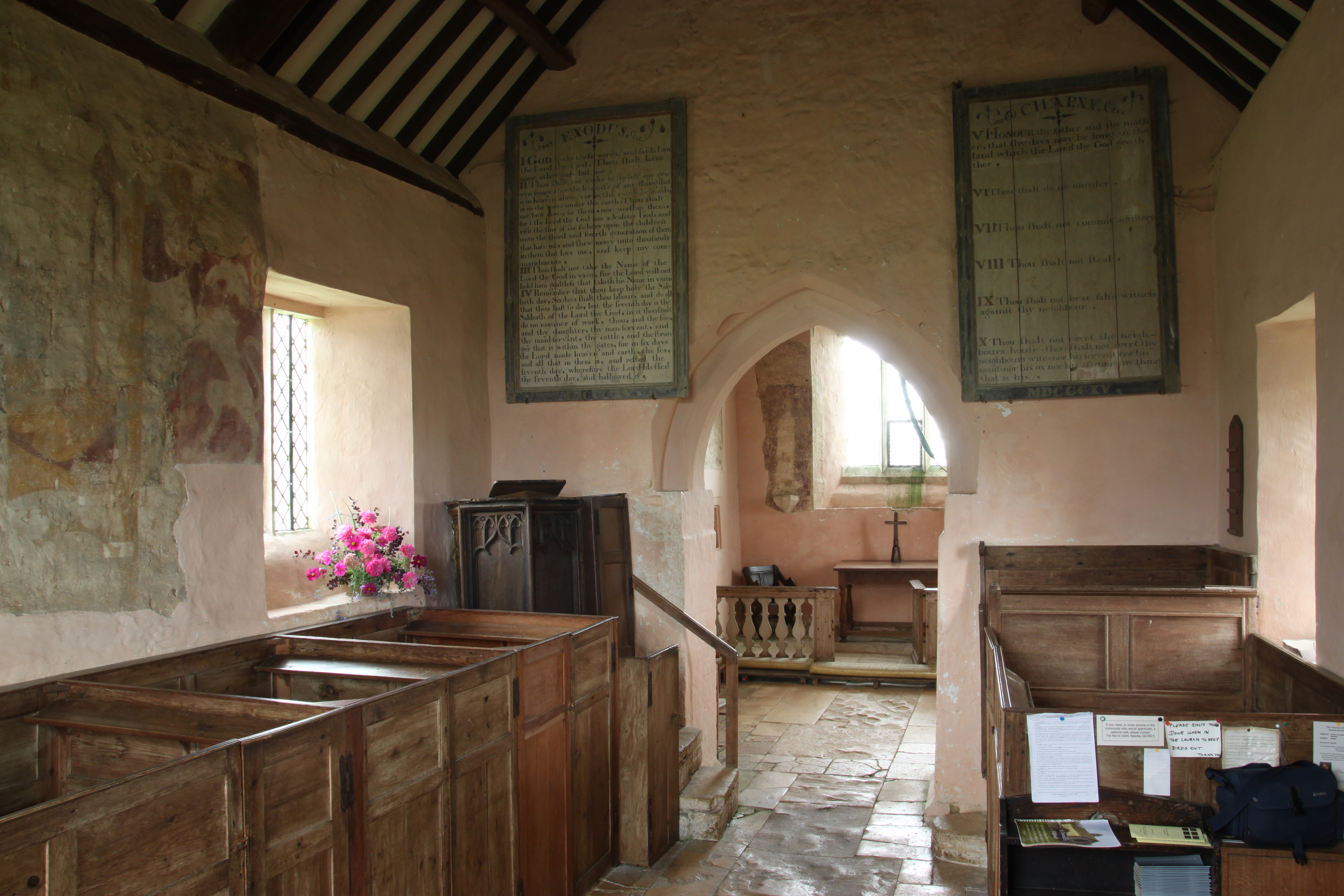
St Oswald's Church; a rustic interior with box pews, ochre walls and medieval wallpaintings

== Sources and further reading ==
- Baggs, A.P.; Chance, Eleanor; Colvin, Christina; Day, C.J.; Selwyn, Nesta; Townley, Simon C. (1996). Crossley, Alan; Currie, C.R.J. (eds.). A History of the County of Oxford, Volume 13: Bampton Hundred (Part One). Victoria County History. pp. 1–5.
- Edwards, John (1982). "A Newly-Deciphered Wall-painting of St. Martin at Widford". Oxoniensia. XLVII. Oxfordshire Architectural and Historical Society: 127–132.
- Edwards, John (1984). "Widford Wall-paintings: More New Decipherments". Oxoniensia. XLIX. Oxfordshire Architectural and Historical Society: 133–139.
- Sherwood, Jennifer; Pevsner, Nikolaus (1974). Oxfordshire. The Buildings of England. Harmondsworth: Penguin Books. p. 841. ISBN 0-14-071045-0.
