= Swinbrook and Widford =

Civil parish in Oxfordshire, England

Coordinates: 51°48′27″N 1°36′02″W

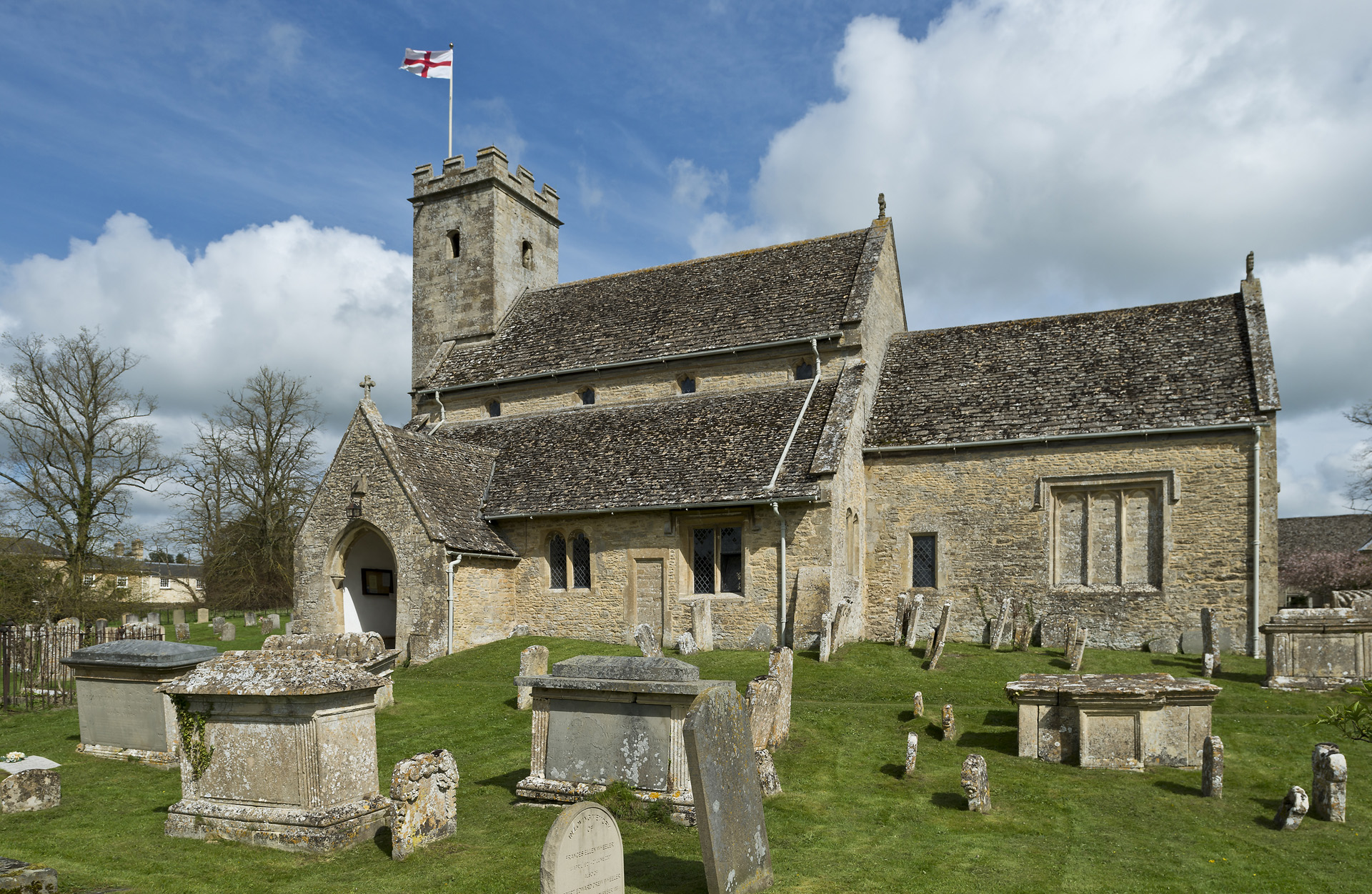
- Swinbrook church

- Location within Oxfordshire
- Population: 139 (2001 census)
- Civil parish: Swinbrook and Widford
- District: West Oxfordshire
- Shire county: Oxfordshire
- Region: South East
- Country: England
- Sovereign state: United Kingdom
- UK Parliament: Witney

Swinbrook and Widford is a civil parish in West Oxfordshire district, in the county of Oxfordshire, England. It comprises the village of Swinbrook and the hamlet of Widford. The 2001 census recorded its population as 139.

The parish was formed on 1 April 1932 from "Swinbrook", "Widford", Fulbrook and Shilton.
