= USS R-19 =

R-class submarine of the United States

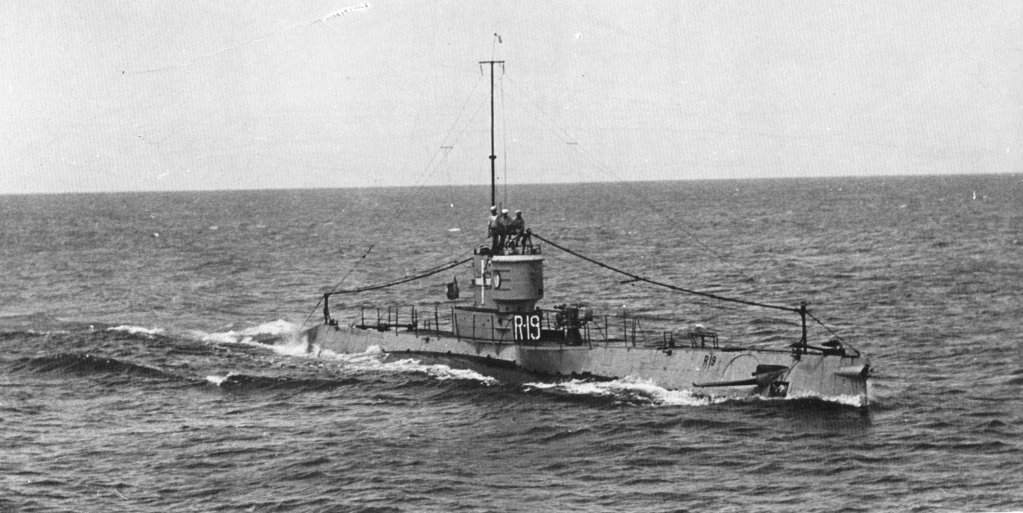
- USS R-19 (SS-96) is shown here with her telescoping radio mast raised, note the large white "+" painted on the submarine's fairwater for recognition

History

United States
- Name: R-19
- Ordered: 29 August 1916
- Builder: Union Iron Works, San Francisco, California
- Cost: $772,459.09 (hull and machinery)
- Laid down: 23 June 1917
- Launched: 28 January 1918
- Sponsored by: Mrs. Janet Irvine
- Commissioned: 7 October 1918
- Decommissioned: 15 May 1931
- Recommissioned: 6 January 1941
- Decommissioned: 9 March 1942
- Stricken: 22 June 1945
- Identification: Hull symbol: SS-96 (17 July 1920); Call sign: NEGK
- Fate: Transferred to United Kingdom, 9 March 1942

United Kingdom
- Name: P.514
- Acquired: 9 March 1942
- Fate: Sunk in ramming, 21 June 1942

General characteristics
- Class & type: R-1-class submarine
- Displacement: 574 long tons (583 t) surfaced; 685 long tons (696 t) submerged
- Length: 186 feet 3 inches (56.77 m)
- Beam: 18 ft (5.5 m)
- Draft: 15 ft 6 in (4.72 m)
- Installed power: 880 brake horsepower (656 kW) diesel; 934 hp (696 kW) electric
- Propulsion: 2 × NELSECO 6-EB-14 diesel engines; 2 × Electro-Dynamic Company electric motors; 2 × 60-cell batteries; 2 × Propellers
- Speed: 12.5 knots (23.2 km/h; 14.4 mph) surfaced; 9.3 kn (17.2 km/h; 10.7 mph) submerged
- Range: 4,700 nautical miles (8,700 km; 5,400 mi) at 6.2 kn (11.5 km/h; 7.1 mph), 7,000 nmi (13,000 km; 8,100 mi) if fuel loaded into the main ballast tanks
- Test depth: 200 ft (61 m)
- Capacity: 18,880 US gallons (71,500 L; 15,720 imp gal) fuel
- Complement: 2 officers; 27 enlisted
- Armament: 4 × 21-inch (533 mm) torpedo tubes (8 torpedoes); 1 × 3-inch (76 mm)/50-caliber deck gun

USS R-19 (SS-96), also known as "Submarine No. 96", was an R-1-class coastal and harbor defense submarines of the United States Navy commissioned before the end of World War I.

She was recommissioned before the US entered World War II and later transferred to the Royal Navy. She sunk with all hands after a collision on 21 June 1942.

== Design ==
The R-boats built by the Fore River Shipbuilding Company, R-1 through R-14, and the Union Iron Works, R-15 through R-20, are sometimes considered a separate class, R-1-class, from those built by the Lake Torpedo Boat Company, R-21 through R-27, R-21-class.

The submarines had a length of 186 feet 3 inches (56.8 m) overall, a beam of 18 ft (5.5 m), and a mean draft of 15 ft 6 in (4.7 m). They displaced 574 long tons (583 t) on the surface and 685 long tons (696 t) submerged. The R-1-class submarines had a crew of 2 officers and 27 enlisted men. They had a diving depth of 200 ft (61.0 m).

For surface running, the boats were powered by two 440-brake-horsepower (328 kW) NELSECO 6-EB-14 diesel engines, each driving one propeller shaft. When submerged each propeller was driven by a 467-horsepower (348 kW) Electro-Dynamic Company electric motor. They could reach 12.5 knots (23.2 km/h; 14.4 mph) on the surface and 9.3 kn (17.2 km/h; 10.7 mph) underwater. On the surface, the R-1-class had a range of 4,700 nautical miles (8,700 km; 5,400 mi) at 6.2 kn (11.5 km/h; 7.1 mph), or 7,000 nmi (13,000 km; 8,100 mi) if fuel was loaded into their main ballast tanks.

The boats were armed with four 21-inch (533 mm) torpedo tubes in the bow. They carried four reloads, for a total of eight torpedoes. The R-1-class submarines were also armed with a single 3 in (76 mm)/50 caliber deck gun.

== Construction ==
R-19's keel was laid down by the Union Iron Works, of San Francisco, California, on 23 June 1917. She was launched on 28 January 1918, sponsored by Mrs. Janet Irvine, and commissioned on 7 October 1918.

== Service history ==
=== 1918–1931 ===
After commissioning, which was one month before the Armistice with Germany ending World War I took effect, R-19 remained on the West Coast for nine months at San Pedro Submarine Base, San Pedro, until March 1919, and then at San Francisco, undergoing overhaul, until June 1919. On 17 June 1919, R-19 sailed for the Territory of Hawaii. Eight days later, she reached Pearl Harbor, and began almost 12 years of training submarine crews and testing equipment.

When the US Navy adopted its hull classification system on 17 July 1920, she received the hull number SS-96.

On 12 December 1930, R-19 left Pearl Harbor, for the Philadelphia Navy Yard. En route she called at San Diego; voyaged south to the Panama Canal Zone; negotiated the Panama Canal; then voyaged north through the Caribbean Sea, and the coastal waters of the US East Coast; and, finally, up Delaware Bay and the Delaware River to Philadelphia.

On 15 May 1931, R-19 was decommissioned at the Philadelphia Navy Yard, and placed in the Reserve Fleet, where she remained berthed at League Island for the next nine years.

=== 1941–1942 ===
R-19 was recommissioned on 6 January 1941, then went to the Submarine Base, at Groton, Connecticut, where she was reconditioned. During May 1941, R-19 headed south. For the remainder of the spring, summer, and into the fall of 1941, she patrolled and conducted training exercises in the Virgin Islands, and off the Panama Canal Zone. In October 1941, R-19 returned to Groton, and continued her role as a training submarine.

On 9 March 1942, R-19 was decommissioned again.

== Awards ==
- World War I Victory Medal
- American Defense Service Medal
- World War II Victory Medal

== Royal Navy service ==
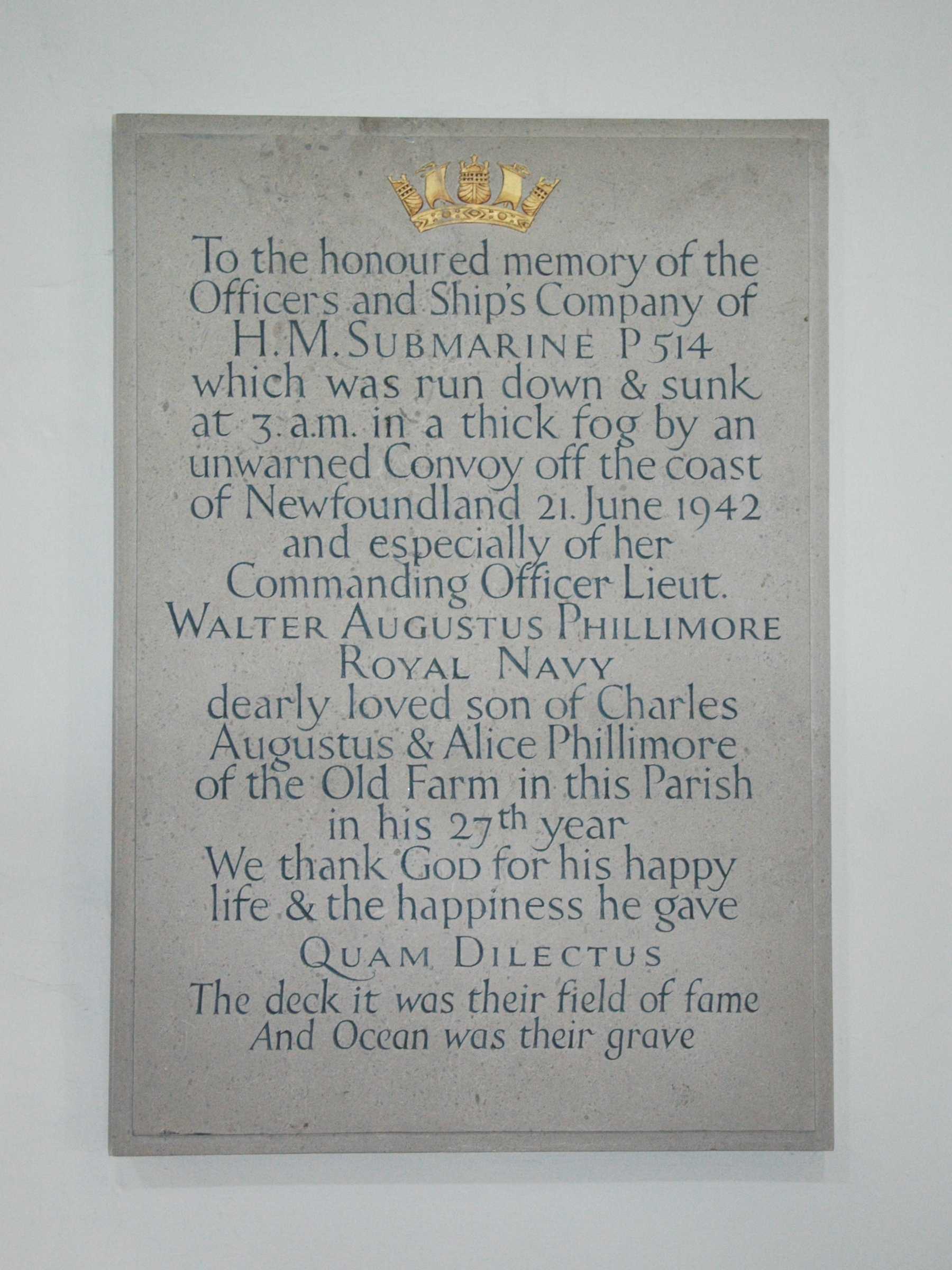
Church monument at Swinbrook, England, to Lt. Phillimore and the crew of HMS P.514

R-19 was transferred to the United Kingdom, under the terms of Lend-Lease, on 9 March 1942. Commissioned into the Royal Navy, she was renamed HMS P.514.

In June 1942, she sailed for St. John's, Newfoundland. At 03:00, on 21 June 1942, while on surface, P.514 encountered a Royal Canadian Navy minesweeper, HMCS Georgian, off St. Shotts, Newfoundland. Unaware of any friendly submarines in the area and receiving no reply to her challenge, Georgian rammed P.514, which sank with the loss of all hands.

A Board of Inquiry ruled that Georgian's commanding officer had acted correctly.

There is a memorial to P.514's officers and men in the Church of England parish church of St. Mary the Virgin in Swinbrook, England.

Wreck location: 46°33′N 53°39′W

== Bibliography ==
- "Table 21 - Ships on Navy List June 30, 1919". Congressional Serial Set. U.S. Government Printing Office: 770. 1921.
- Friedman, Norman (1995). U.S. Submarines Through 1945: An Illustrated Design History. Annapolis, Maryland: Naval Institute Press. ISBN 1-55750-263-3.
- Priolo, Gary. "R-19 (SS-96)". Navsource.net.
- Gardiner, Robert & Gray, Randal (1985). Conway's All the World's Fighting Ships 1906–1921. Annapolis, Maryland: Naval Institute Press. ISBN 0-85177-245-5.
- "R-19". Dictionary of American Naval Fighting Ships. Navy Department, Naval History and Heritage Command. This article incorporates text from this source, which is in the public domain.
- Hall, Anne Martin (1925). Ships of the United States navy and their sponsors, 1913-1923.
- Skaarup, Harold A. "RCN anti-submarine warfare (ASW) training submarines: HMS P.514, HMS P552, HMS P.554, and HNLMS O 15".
