= Worsham, Oxfordshire =

Hamlet in Oxfordshire, England

Coordinates: 51.794°N 1.568°W

Worsham
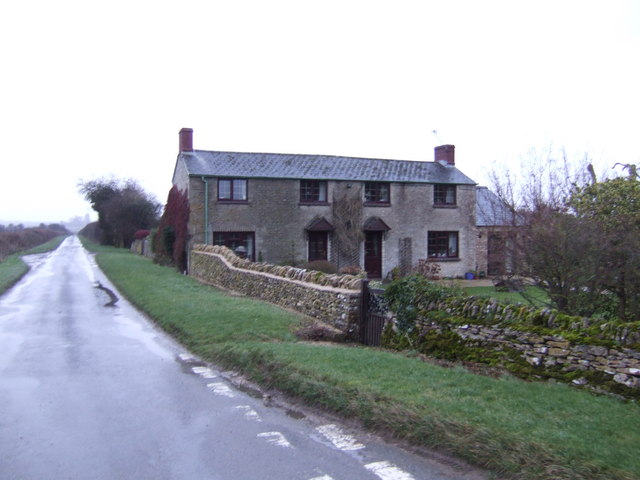
- Worsham Turn Cottages

- Location within Oxfordshire
- OS grid reference: SP2910
- Civil parish: Asthal
- District: West Oxfordshire
- Shire county: Oxfordshire
- Region: South East
- Country: England
- Sovereign state: United Kingdom
- Post town: Witney
- Postcode district: OX29
- Dialling code: 01993
- Police: Thames Valley
- Fire: Oxfordshire
- Ambulance: South Central
- UK Parliament: Witney

Worsham is a hamlet on the River Windrush about 3.5 miles (5.6 km) west of Witney. 0.25 miles (400 m) east of Worsham on the north side of the Windrush are the remains of a small Roman house. In later history Worsham was the site of a water mill. The area also has two Cotswold stone quarries, both now disused.

== Sources ==
- Sherwood, Jennifer; Pevsner, Nikolaus (1974). The Buildings of England: Oxfordshire. Harmondsworth: Penguin. p. 426. ISBN 0-14-071045-0.
