= Temple Guiting =

Village in Gloucestershire, England

Coordinates: 51°57′N 1°52′W

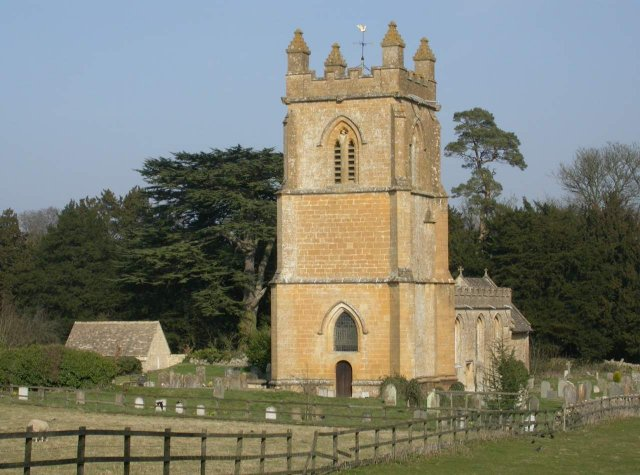
- St Mary's Church

- Location within Gloucestershire
- Population: 463 (2011 Census)
- Civil parish: Temple Guiting
- District: Cotswold
- Shire county: Gloucestershire
- Region: South West
- Country: England
- Sovereign state: United Kingdom
- Post town: Cheltenham
- Postcode district: GL54
- Police: Gloucestershire
- Fire: Gloucestershire
- Ambulance: South Western
- UK Parliament: North Cotswolds

Temple Guiting is a village and civil parish in the Cotswolds, in Gloucestershire, England. The civil parish includes the smaller settlements of Barton, Farmcote, Ford and Kineton. In 2011 the parish had a population of 463.

The place was recorded as plain Guiting (in the form Getinge) in the Domesday Book of 1086, when it was held by Roger de Lacy. In the middle of the 12th century Roger's son Gilbert de Lacy gave land here to the Knights Templar, who founded the Temple Guiting Preceptory. The place then became known as Temple Guiting after the Knights Templar.

St Mary's Church dates back to the 12th century and was restored in 1884. It is a Grade I listed building. The church is part of the Benefice of the Seven Churches which also includes Guiting Power, Cutsdean, Farmcote, Lower Slaughter with Eyford, Upper Slaughter, and Naunton.

Manor Farmhouse is an early 16th-century house, also a Grade I listed building.

Within the parish is Cotswolds Farm Park, privately owned by Adam Henson, a tourist attraction with 50 breeds of farm animals.
