= Percy Manning =

Antiquary and folklorist

Percy Manning (1870–1917) was a British antiquary, folklorist, and archaeologist, with a special interest in Oxfordshire.

== Early life ==
Percy Manning was born in Headingley, West Yorkshire, to John Manning (1830–1874), a boilermaker, and his wife Sophia Gotobed (1833–1914). John Manning died when Percy Manning was four years old. In 1880, the family moved to Watford. Manning attended preparatory school in Hove, before attending Clifton College in Bristol in 1884. He matriculated to New College, Oxford in 1888.

Manning performed poorly at university. He received a third in classical moderations in 1890, failed literae humaniores in 1892, before being removed from college in 1893. Following this, he continued his studies at a private tutorial college, Marcon's Hall, and gained degrees in 1896, when he was elected to the Society of Antiquaries.

Manning suffered from severe aphasia which may have hindered his academic career. It is believed, however, that his interest in activities outside of the curriculum were also significant. He developed a strong interest in antiquities and archaeology early in his university career, where he was honorary secretary of the Oxford Architectural and Historical Society, and a founding member of the Oxford University Brass Rubbing Society. During his 1892 examinations, he was excavating at Alchester.

== Collections ==
Percy Manning began to collect in the 1890s, through archaeological fieldwork, gathering oral histories, and purchasing rare books and manuscripts. He donated artefacts to the Ashmolean Museum, Pitt Rivers Museum, and the Bodleian Library at this time. He had a particular interest in Oxfordshire, collecting items from over 400 localities in the county and providing 185 items to the OAHS's 1894 exhibition of Oxfordshire antiquities.

Manning continued to work in Oxford as an antiquary and archaeologist until his death from pneumonia in 1917. His collection represented traditional antiquarian interests, such as church and manorial history, but he was notably active in his search to record local customs and folklore. He worked with Thomas James Carter, a retired brickmaker and self-taught palaeontologist, as an intermediary who was better able to obtain oral histories from the working people of Oxfordshire.

After Manning's death in 1917, his personal collection was bequeathed to the University of Oxford and divided between the Ashmolean Museum, the Pitt Rivers Museum, and the Bodleian Libraries. The Bodleian's collection consists of about 500 volumes of 19th and 20th century material, consisting of books on the antiquities of Oxfordshire and the University, some manuscripts, and local engravings and drawings.

== The Folklore Society ==
Manning was a member of The Folklore Society from 1896 until 1917. He does not appear to have held office in the society, but he read a paper at a meeting in 1897 on 'Oxford Seasonal Festivals'. He also published articles in their Folklore journal; one an account of May Day in Watford (1893), and four 'Stray Notes on Oxfordshire Folklore'.

== Morris Dancing ==
Manning may be credited with a role in the British folk revival. In 1898, he worked to equip the Headington Quarry Morris dancers for a performance in the Oxford corn exchange. They continued to perform after this event, and their encounter with Cecil Sharp was the beginning of the folk-song revival in England.
