= HMCS Georgian =

History

Canada
- Name: Georgian
- Builder: Dufferin Shipbuilding Co., Toronto
- Laid down: 10 October 1940
- Launched: 28 January 1941
- Commissioned: 23 September 1941
- Decommissioned: 23 October 1945
- Identification: Pennant number: J144
- Honours and awards: Atlantic 1941-42, 1944, Normandy 1944, Gulf of St. Lawrence 1942
- Fate: Broken up 1946

General characteristics
- Class & type: Bangor-class minesweeper
- Displacement: 672 long tons (683 t)
- Length: 180 ft (54.9 m) oa
- Beam: 28 ft 6 in (8.7 m)
- Draught: 9 ft 9 in (3.0 m)
- Propulsion: 2 Admiralty 3-drum water tube boilers, 2 shafts, vertical triple-expansion reciprocating engines, 2,400 ihp (1,790 kW)
- Speed: 16.5 knots (31 km/h)
- Complement: 83
- Armament: 1 x QF 3 in (76 mm) 20 cwt gun; 1 x QF 2 pdr Mark VIII; 2 × QF 20 mm Oerlikon guns; 40 depth charges as escort

HMCS Georgian (pennant J144) was a Bangor-class minesweeper constructed for the Royal Canadian Navy during the Second World War. Primarily used as a convoy escort in the Battle of the Atlantic and the Battle of the St. Lawrence, the minesweeper had the misfortune of mistakenly sinking the British submarine HMS P514 off the coast of Newfoundland. Georgian also saw service in European waters, taking part in the invasion of Normandy. Following the war the ship was discarded and sold for scrap.

== Design and description ==
A British design, the Bangor-class minesweepers were smaller than the preceding Halcyon-class minesweepers in British service, but larger than the Fundy class in Canadian service. They came in two versions powered by different engines; those with a diesel engines and those with vertical triple-expansion steam engines. Georgian was of the latter design and was larger than her diesel-engined cousins. Georgian was 180 feet (54.9 m) long overall, had a beam of 28 feet 6 inches (8.7 m) and a draught of 9 feet 9 inches (3.0 m). The minesweeper had a displacement of 672 long tons (683 t). She had a complement of 6 officers and 77 enlisted.

Georgian had two vertical triple-expansion steam engines, each driving one shaft, using steam provided by two Admiralty three-drum boilers. The engines produced a total of 2,400 indicated horsepower (1,800 kW) and gave a maximum speed of 16.5 knots (30.6 km/h; 19.0 mph). The minesweeper could carry a maximum of 150 long tons (152 t) of fuel oil.

The minesweeper was armed initially with a single quick-firing (QF) 4-inch (102 mm)/40 caliber Mk IV gun mounted forward that was later replaced with a single QF 3-inch (76 mm) 20 cwt gun mounted forward. (Note: "Cwt" is the abbreviation for hundredweight, 20 cwt referring to the weight of the gun.) The ship was also fitted with a QF 2-pounder Mark VIII aft and was eventually fitted with single-mounted QF 20 mm Oerlikon guns on the bridge wings. Georgian had her 2-pounder gun replaced with a powered twin 20 mm mount in preparation for duties associated with the invasion of Normandy. Those ships assigned to convoy duty were armed with two depth charge launchers and four chutes to deploy their 40 depth charges.

== Operational history ==
The minesweeper was ordered as part of the 1939–1940 construction programme. The ship's keel was laid down on 10 October 1940 by Dufferin Shipbuilding at their yard in Toronto, Ontario. Georgian was launched on 28 January 1941 and commissioned into the Royal Canadian Navy on 23 September 1941 at Toronto.

Following work ups Georgian was assigned to Sydney Force, the local patrol and escort force operating out of Sydney, Nova Scotia. In January 1942, the minesweeper transferred to Newfoundland Force, the local patrol and escort force operating out of St. John's, Newfoundland and remained with the unit until February 1944. On 21 January 1942, Georgian was escorting the merchant William Hansen off Cape Race when the merchant was torpedoed by the German U-boat U-754. The merchant sank and Georgian was unable to gain contact with the submarine but dropped depth charges anyway. The depth charge explosions shook up a second submarine, U-701, that had been in the vicinity. On 21 June 1942, Georgian was travelling down the coast of Newfoundland with a coastal convoy when she spotted a submarine. Georgian issued a challenge to the submarine but received no response. The minesweeper then rammed the submarine, believing it to be the enemy. However, it was later discovered to be HMS P514 which had been transiting between Argentia, Newfoundland and St. John's and had been separated from her escorts. The entire crew of the submarine was lost. The German U-boat U-517 encountered Georgian on 21 September 1942 in the Gulf of St. Lawrence. Georgian left the screen of the Sydney – Quebec convoy SQ 38 on 21 September 1942 and went ahead to Gaspé, Quebec to refuel. Upon returning to the convoy, she came up on the submarine from behind. U-517 was depth charged and thought to be sunk by Georgian. However, the submarine survived and carried out repairs the next night near Sept-Îles, Quebec.

In February 1944, Georgian was sent to Europe as part of Canada's contribution the invasion of Normandy. Georgian bounced around the minesweeping flotillas, serving with British units after arriving in the United Kingdom. Before the assault on 6 June, Georgian was assigned to the 14th Minesweeping Flotilla, a British unit assigned to sweep channels through the minefield in the American sector. The 14th Minesweeping Flotilla swept the Baie de la Seine an hour after the assault began.

The minesweeper returned to Canada in January 1945 to undergo a refit at Lunenburg, Nova Scotia. Following the refit, Georgian returned to European waters joining the 31st Minesweeping Flotilla. The ship returned to Canada in September and was paid off on 23 October 1945 at Sydney. The vessel was laid up at Shelburne, Nova Scotia to await disposal. The ship was sold and broken up for scrap in 1946.
