= Cutsdean =

Coordinates: 51°58′N 1°52′W

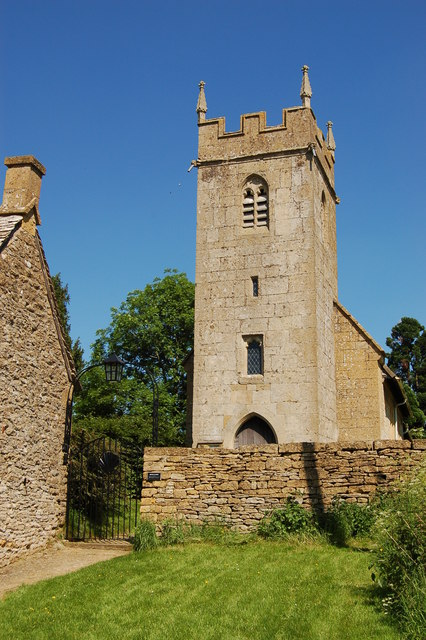
- Church of St James at Cutsdean

- Location within Gloucestershire
- District: Cotswold
- Shire county: Gloucestershire
- Region: South West
- Country: England
- Sovereign state: United Kingdom
- Post town: Cheltenham
- Postcode district: GL54
- Police: Gloucestershire
- Fire: Gloucestershire
- Ambulance: South Western
- UK Parliament: North Cotswolds

Cutsdean is a rural village in the Cotswolds and smaller than average sized parish, a few miles east north-east of Cheltenham, Gloucestershire and the same distance south-southeast of Evesham. The River Windrush runs through the village.

== History ==
The key estates of this 1,560-acre (6.3 km^{2}) chapelry of Bredon parish, can be traced a generation or more further than typical, back to Anglo-Saxon England charters. Its main estate and church were long possessions of the Worcester Priory, and were part of Worcestershire until 1931, when the detached part (exclave) status was resolved, and it was moved to Gloucestershire. Its population was 116, across 30 households in 1901; both figures stood in 1911, unchanged.

== River ==
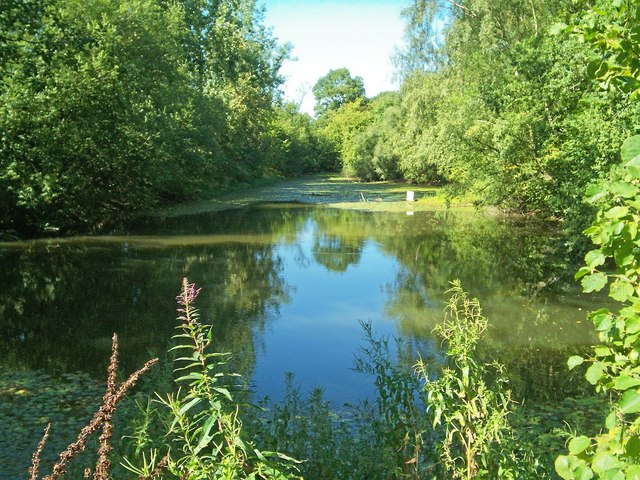
Dammed river with lily pads and algae, lined by deciduous trees

The west of the parish is marked by the Windrush. It has been briefly dammed, creating a tree-lined head of water, assisting the flow below in dry weather, also allowing for some algae which help to feed fish and de-nitrify the river in its rural, relatively headwater stage.
