= Berkshire Archaeological Society =

British archeological society

The Berkshire Archaeological Society is the society for the study of the archaeology of the county of Berkshire in England. It was established in 1871 and published annual reports and transactions from 1878 until 1883. In 1889 it began to publish the Quarterly Journal of the Berkshire Archaeological and Architectural Society. This became the Berks, Bucks, and Oxon Archaeological Journal in 1895 and the Berkshire Archaeological Journal in 1931. Electronic archives of the journals are held by the Archaeology Data Service at the University of York.
