= River Windrush =

Windrush
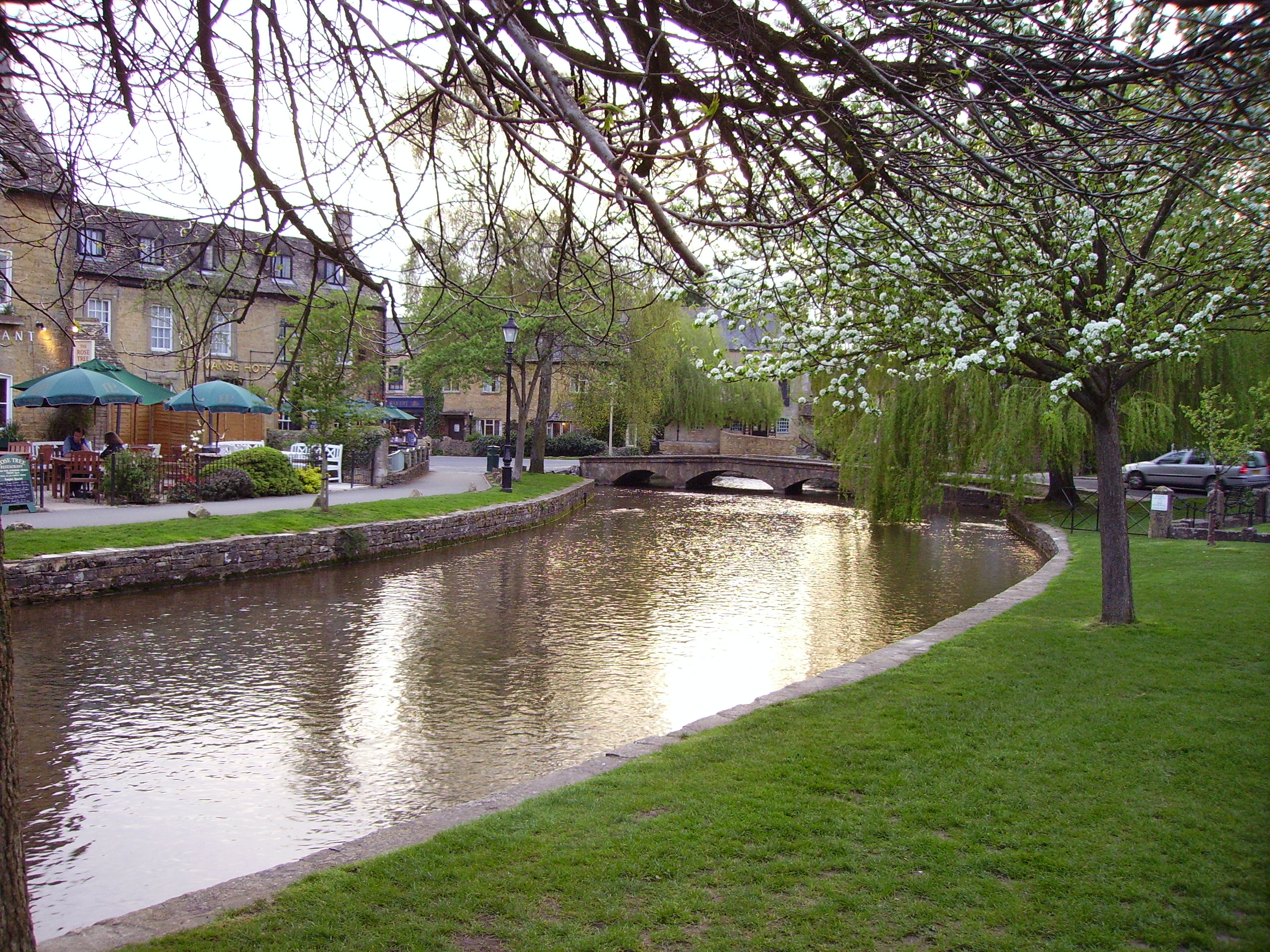
- The Windrush at Bourton-on-the-Water

Location
- Country: England
- Counties: Gloucestershire, Oxfordshire
- Towns: Bourton-on-the-Water, Burford, Witney

Physical characteristics
- Source
  - location: Gloucestershire, Cotswold Hills
  - coordinates: 51°58′54.51″N 1°51′59.64″W
- Mouth: River Thames
  - location: Newbridge
  - coordinates: 51°42′36.03″N 1°25′7.19″W
- Length: 65 km (40 mi)
- Discharge
  - location: Newbridge
  - average: 3.27 m^{3}/s (115 cu ft/s)
  - minimum: 0.11 m^{3}/s (3.9 cu ft/s)26 August 1976
  - maximum: 21.6 m^{3}/s (760 cu ft/s)6 December 1960
- Discharge
  - location: Worsham
  - average: 2.40 m^{3}/s (85 cu ft/s)
- Discharge
  - location: Bourton-on-the-Water
  - average: 1.20 m^{3}/s (42 cu ft/s)

The River Windrush is a tributary of the River Thames in central England. It rises near Snowshill in Gloucestershire and flows south east for 65 km (40 mi) via Burford and Witney to meet the Thames at Newbridge in Oxfordshire.

The river gives its name to the village of Windrush in Gloucestershire.

== River ==
The Windrush starts in the Cotswold Hills in Gloucestershire northeast of Taddington, which is north of Guiting Power, Temple Guiting, Ford and Cutsdean. It flows for about 35 miles (56 km): through Bourton-on-the-Water, by the village of Windrush, Gloucestershire, into Oxfordshire and through Burford, Witney, Ducklington and Standlake. It meets the Thames at Newbridge upstream of Northmoor Lock.

The river-name Windrush is first attested in an Anglo-Saxon charter of 779, where it appears as Uuenrisc. It appears as Wenris and Wænric in charters of 949, and Wenríc in one of 969. The name means 'white fen', from the Welsh gwyn and the Old Celtic reisko.

The river may still host trout, grayling, perch, chub, roach and dace. It held good populations of native crayfish until at least the 1980s. Its waters were used in cloth and woollen blanket making in Witney from mid 17th century. In 2007, it was among many of the district's rivers to flood. It flooded generally but perhaps most acutely in Witney, whose only bridge across the river was submerged. Some decline has been noted, especially in years of release of untreated sewage from plants of Thames Water. This was documented in the Channel 4 docudrama Dirty Business. The river after drier spells sees algae formations.

The ship HMT Empire Windrush, synonymous with postwar immigration of West Indian people to the UK, was named after the river.

== See also ==
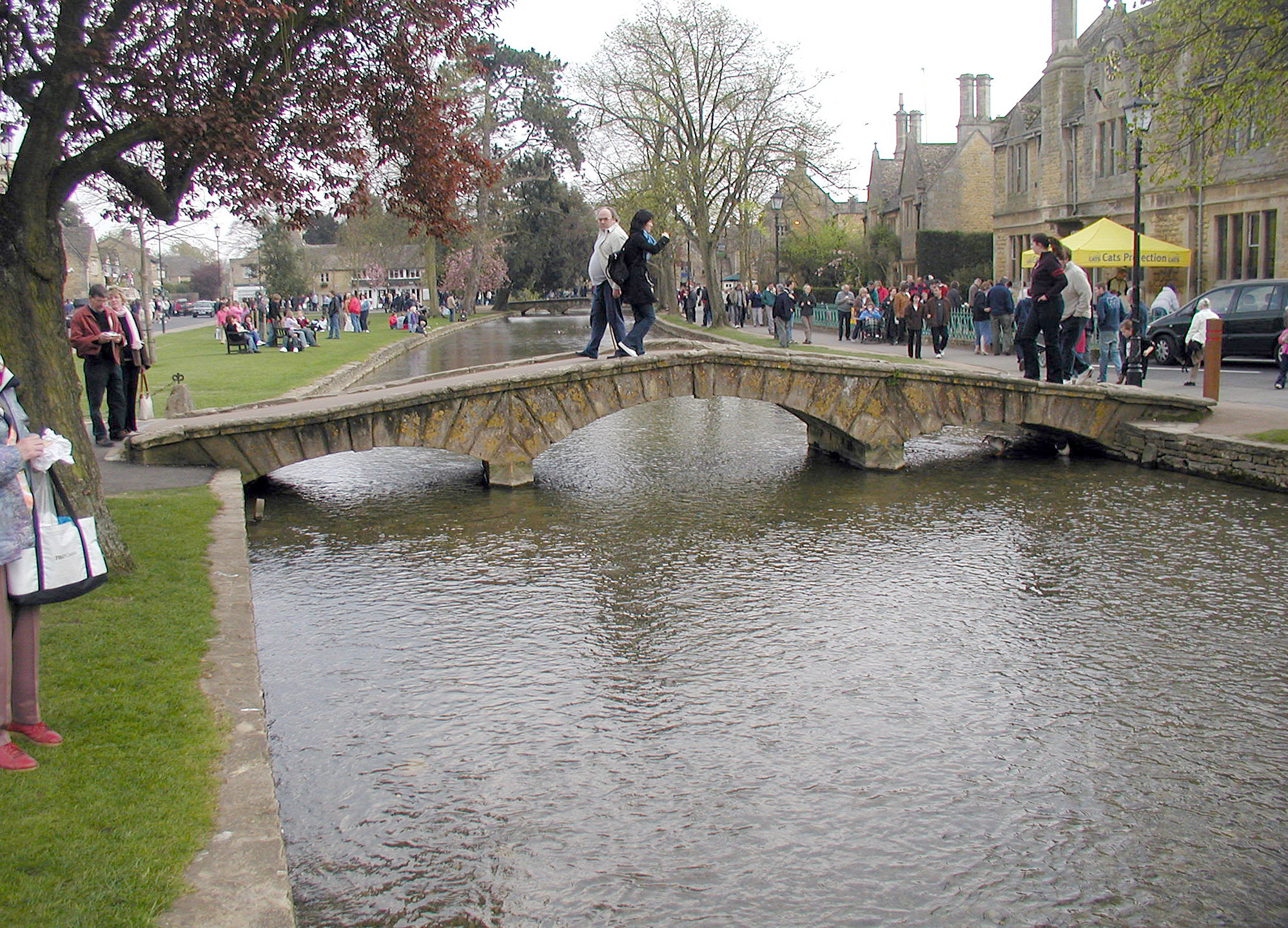
A pedestrian bridge across the River Windrush at Bourton-on-the-Water

- Tributaries of the River Thames
- List of rivers in England

Next confluence upstream	River Thames	Next confluence downstream
River Cole (south)	River Windrush	River Evenlode (north)
