= Long Hanborough =

Village in Oxfordshire, England

Coordinates: 51.822°N 1.393°W

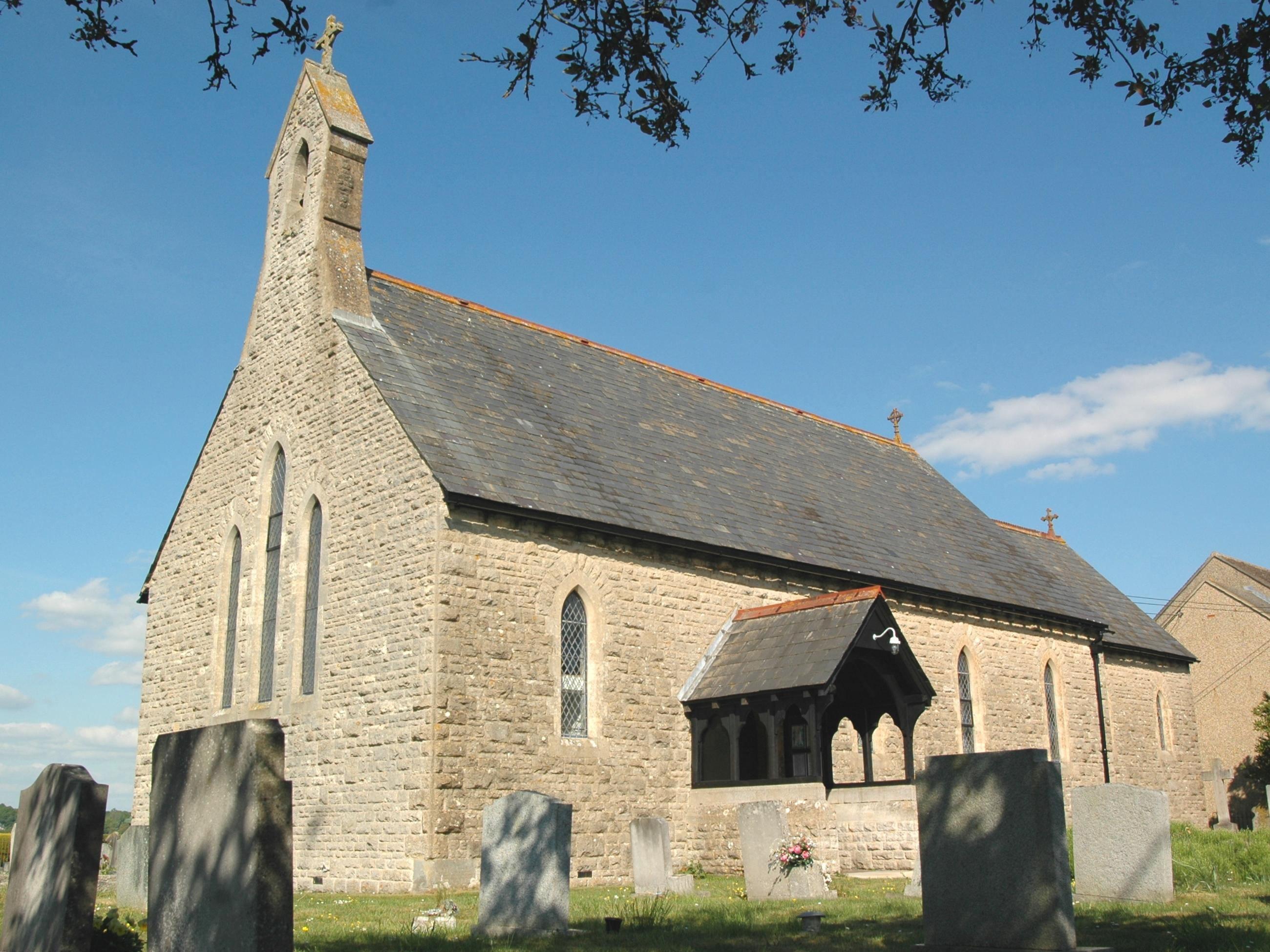
- Christ Church parish church

- Location within Oxfordshire
- Population: 2,630 (parish, including Church Hanborough) (2011 Census)
- OS grid reference: SP4114
- Civil parish: Hanborough
- District: West Oxfordshire
- Shire county: Oxfordshire
- Region: South East
- Country: England
- Sovereign state: United Kingdom
- Post town: Witney
- Postcode district: OX29
- Dialling code: 01993
- Police: Thames Valley
- Fire: Oxfordshire
- Ambulance: South Central
- UK Parliament: Witney
- Website: Hanborough Parish Council

Long Hanborough is a village in Hanborough civil parish, about 4 miles (6.4 km) northeast of Witney in West Oxfordshire, England. The village is the major settlement in Hanborough parish. The 2011 Census recorded the parish's population as 2,630.

== History ==
An infants' school was built in 1879 and enlarged in 1893. It closed in 1998 and was merged into Hanborough Manor School. The old school building has been converted to a private house.

Christ Church Church of England parish church was built in 1893. It is now part of the Benefice of Hanborough and Freeland. The village also has a Methodist church.

=== Railway ===
The Oxford, Worcester and Wolverhampton Railway was built to the north of Long Hanborough in 1853, with Handborough Station (now called Hanborough: note the change of spelling) opened just east of Long Hanborough. In 1935 the Great Western Railway opened a small station on the Combe Road to serve Combe, although as near Long Hanborough as Combe, and with a very limited service.

On 30 January 1965 a funeral train with the coffin of Sir Winston Churchill was hauled to Hanborough Station by Battle of Britain Class locomotive 34051 Winston Churchill. From Hanborough the funeral cortège went to St Martin's Church, Bladon where the funeral was held and Churchill was buried.

Currently Great Western Railway trains link Hanborough with London Paddington via Oxford in one direction, and Hereford via Worcester in the other.

== Amenities ==
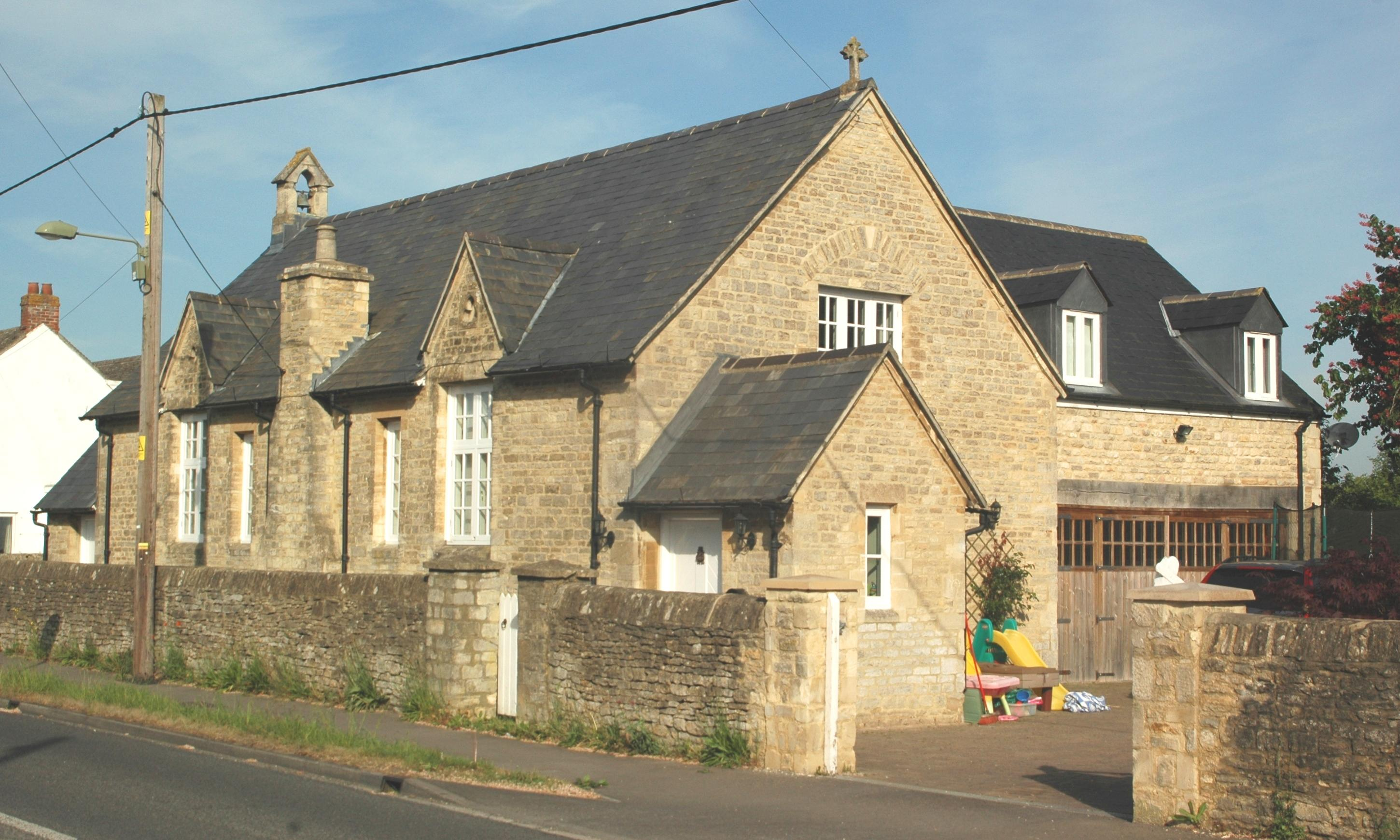
The old school house was built in 1879 and was still the infants' school until 1998

Long Hanborough has a post office, a GP's practice, a dental practice, a Co-Operative store, a fish and chip shop and a bicycle repair shop. Hanborough Manor Church of England School is the village's primary school.

Long Hanborough has two pubs, the Three Horseshoes and the George & Dragon. Until the 2000s it had two other pubs. In 2009 the Swan, in Millwood End, was a gastropub, but it has since ceased trading and is now a private home. The Bell was controlled by Greene King Brewery, and is no longer trading.

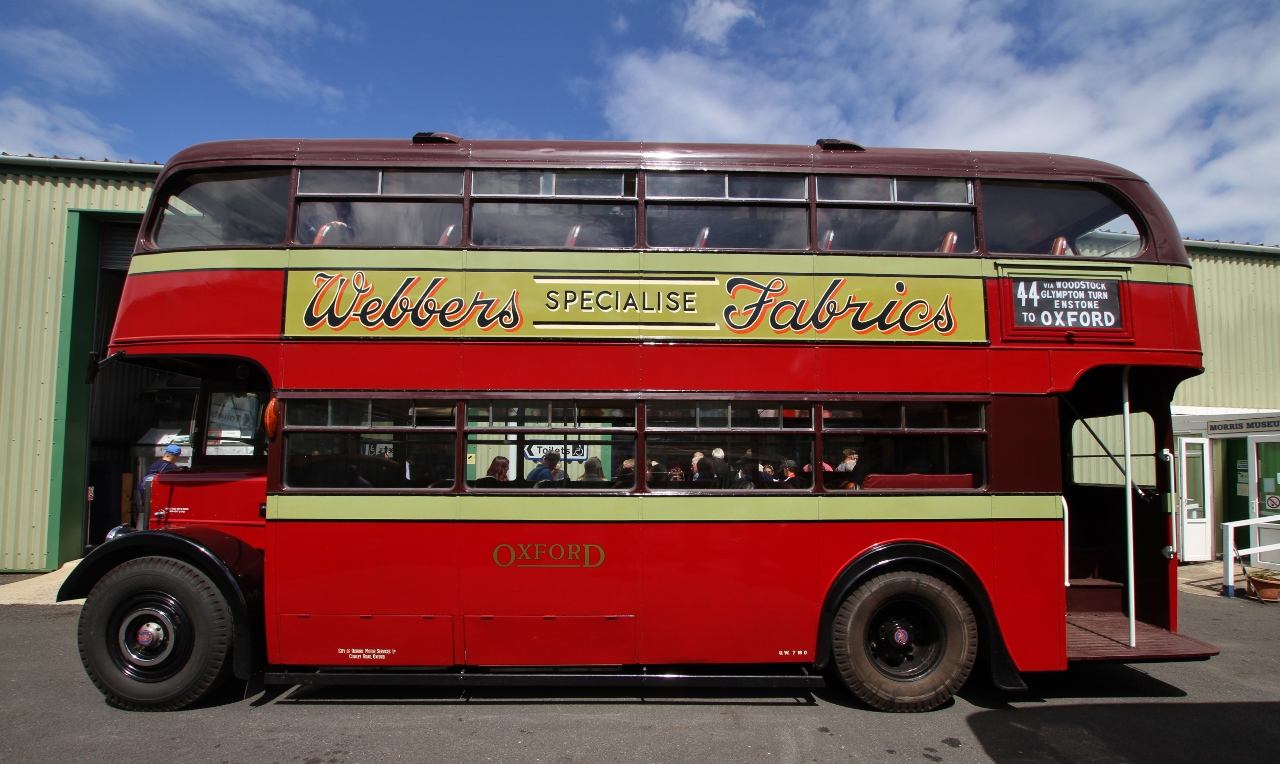
1950 AEC Regent III bus at Oxford Bus Museum, next to Hanborough railway station

Next to Hanborough railway station are Oxford Bus Museum and the Morris Motors Museum. The bus museum has a collection of 40 historic buses and coaches that operated in Oxfordshire, plus relics of Oxford's former horse tramways. The Morris Motors museum has a dozen historic vehicles built by Nuffield Organization companies, mainly Morris Motors.

Hanborough has a Women's Institute.

=== Buses ===
Stagecoach West route S7 serves Long Hanborough seven days a week. Buses run twice an hour to Witney in one direction, and to Oxford via Woodstock, Kidlington, and Oxford Parkway in the other.
