= 2008 West Oxfordshire District Council election =

2008 UK local government election

Map of the results of the 2008 West Oxfordshire District Council election. Conservatives in blue and Liberal Democrats in yellow. Wards in dark grey were not contested in 2008.

The 2008 West Oxfordshire District Council election took place on 1 May 2008 to elect members of West Oxfordshire District Council in Oxfordshire, England. One third of the council was up for election and the Conservative Party stayed in overall control of the council.

After the election, the composition of the council was:

- Conservative 40
- Liberal Democrats 6
- Independent 2
- Labour 1

== Background ==
Before the election the Conservatives controlled the council with 36 councillors, compared to eight for the Liberal Democrats, four Independents and one Labour councillor. 17 of the 49 seats on the council were up for election in 2008, which meant the Conservatives were guaranteed to keep a majority.

The Conservative leader of the council, Barry Norton, in North Leigh ward was one of four Conservatives who were elected without opposition, with the Conservatives being the only party to have a full 17 candidates. Both the Liberal Democrats and Green Party had eight candidates, Labour had five candidates, UK Independence Party two and there were two independents.

13 councillors sought re-election, with the councillors who stood down at the election including the Conservative former council chairman Tony Walker from Kingham, Rollright and Enstone ward, the Liberal Democrat group leader Stuart Brooks of Freeland and Hanborough ward, and Independent Derrick Millard of Stonesfield and Tackley ward.

== Election result ==
The Conservatives gained four seats to win 11 of the 13 seats contested. This took the Conservatives to 40 of the 49 councillors and reduced the opposition to its lowest level on the council as of 2008. Conservative gains included taking Witney South from independent, former Witney mayor, Peter Green, while Conservative Ian Hudspeth held Woodstock and Bladon by 45 votes.

The Liberal Democrats lost two seats to be reduced to four councillors, although Margaret Stevens narrowly held Eynsham and Cassington for the party by four votes. Meanwhile, the number of independents was reduced by two to two councillors, while Labour remained with one councillor. Overall 11 of the 13 councillors who stood were re-elected with average turnout at the election being 39.84%.

West Oxfordshire local election result 2008
Party	Seats	Gains	Losses	Net gain/loss	Seats %	Votes %	Votes	+/−
Conservative	15	4	0	+4	88.2	56.5	10,194	+4.1%
Liberal Democrats	2	0	2	-2	11.8	22.5	4,065	+3.2%
Green	0	0	0	0	0	8.5	1,527	-2.1%
Labour	0	0	0	0	0	7.9	1,416	-1.7%
Independent	0	0	2	-2	0	3.5	629	-3.2%
UKIP	0	0	0	0	0	1.1	203	-0.2%

== Ward results ==
Chadlington and Churchill
Party	Candidate	Votes	%	±%
Conservative	Terence Owen	560	78.4	+12.4
Liberal Democrats	Christopher Tatton	154	21.6	+1.5
Majority		406	56.9	+11.0
Turnout		714	45.3	−4.6
Conservative hold		Swing		

Charlbury and Finstock
Party	Candidate	Votes	%	±%
Liberal Democrats	Glena Chadwick	883	58.0	+5.2
Conservative	Gill Hill	639	42.0	+3.3
Majority		244	16.0	+1.9
Turnout		1,522	51.6	+0.4
Liberal Democrats hold		Swing		

Chipping Norton
Party	Candidate	Votes	%	±%
Conservative	Patrick McHugh	1,005	49.4	+10.1
Labour	Rob Evans	620	30.5	−16.8
Independent	Keith Greenwell	304	14.9	+1.5
Green	Brian Luney	105	5.2	+5.2
Majority		385	18.9	
Turnout		2,034	41.1	−1.8
Conservative hold		Swing		

Eynsham and Cassington
Party	Candidate	Votes	%	±%
Liberal Democrats	Margaret Stevens	825	45.7	−3.4
Conservative	Sheila Bibb	821	45.5	+8.5
Green	Katharine Nathan	158	8.8	+2.1
Majority		4	0.2	−11.9
Turnout		1,804	40.5	−1.6
Liberal Democrats hold		Swing		

Freeland and Hanborough
Party	Candidate	Votes	%	±%
Conservative	Toby Morris	727	49.9	+1.0
Liberal Democrats	Mike Baggaley	632	43.4	+3.0
Labour	Hugh Burton	98	6.7	+2.7
Majority		95	6.5	−2.1
Turnout		1,457	44.3	−1.4
Conservative gain from Liberal Democrats		Swing		

Hailey, Minster Lovell and Leafield
Party	Candidate	Votes	%	±%
Conservative	Simon Hoare	unopposed		
Conservative hold		Swing		

Kingham, Rollright and Enstone
Party	Candidate	Votes	%	±%
Conservative	Dennis Stickley	unopposed		
Conservative hold		Swing		

Milton under Wychwood
Party	Candidate	Votes	%	±%
Conservative	Jeff Haine	unopposed		
Conservative hold		Swing		

North Leigh
Party	Candidate	Votes	%	±%
Conservative	Barry Norton	unopposed		
Conservative hold		Swing		

Standlake, Aston and Stanton Harcourt
Party	Candidate	Votes	%	±%
Conservative	Hilary Fenton	939	58.7	+10.4
Liberal Democrats	Elisabeth Bickley	660	41.3	−10.4
Majority		279	17.4	
Turnout		1,599	49.3	+1.7
Conservative gain from Liberal Democrats		Swing		

Stonesfield and Tackley
Party	Candidate	Votes	%	±%
Conservative	Gillian Oldfield	898	69.5	+69.5
Green	Susan Turnbull	395	30.5	+1.5
Majority		503	39.0	
Turnout		1,293	40.8	+0.8
Conservative gain from Independent		Swing		

Witney Central
Party	Candidate	Votes	%	±%
Conservative	Colin Adams	703	62.8	+9.4
Labour	Philip Edney	250	22.3	+3.4
Green	Stuart MacDonald	89	8.0	−3.6
Liberal Democrats	Brenda Churchill	77	6.9	−9.2
Majority		453	40.5	+6.0
Turnout		1,119	33.1	−0.2
Conservative hold		Swing		

Witney East
Party	Candidate	Votes	%	±%
Conservative	Roger Curry	1,108	63.6	+5.9
Labour	Duncan Enright	311	17.9	+1.1
Green	Enid Dossett-Davies	198	11.4	+0.5
UKIP	James Mawle	124	7.1	+7.1
Majority		797	45.8	+5.0
Turnout		1,741	32.4	−0.7
Conservative hold		Swing		

Witney North
Party	Candidate	Votes	%	±%
Conservative	Martin Chapman	594	54.1	+2.7
Green	Richard Dossett-Davies	314	28.6	−3.5
Liberal Democrats	Ruth Smith	189	17.2	+0.7
Majority		280	25.5	+6.3
Turnout		1,097	35.1	−1.9
Conservative hold		Swing		

Witney South
Party	Candidate	Votes	%	±%
Conservative	Jane Doughty	810	58.4	+3.2
Independent	Peter Green	325	23.4	+23.4
Green	Jill Jones	174	12.5	+1.5
UKIP	David Phipps	79	5.7	−2.5
Majority		485	34.9	−6.3
Turnout		1,388	30.7	−4.0
Conservative gain from Independent		Swing		

Witney West
Party	Candidate	Votes	%	±%
Conservative	Louise Chapman	705	75.3	−4.0
Labour	Dave Wesson	137	14.6	+14.6
Green	Sandra Simpson	94	10.0	−10.7
Majority		568	60.7	+2.1
Turnout		936	30.3	−0.5
Conservative hold		Swing		

Woodstock and Bladon
Party	Candidate	Votes	%	±%
Conservative	Ian Hudspeth	685	51.5	+7.5
Liberal Democrats	Elizabeth Poskitt	645	48.5	+6.8
Majority		40	3.0	+0.7
Turnout		1,330	43.6	−5.5
Conservative hold		Swing		
