= 2010 West Oxfordshire District Council election =

2010 UK local government election

Map of the results of the 2010 West Oxfordshire District Council election. Conservatives in blue and Liberal Democrats in yellow. Wards in dark grey were not contested in 2010.

The 2010 West Oxfordshire District Council election took place on 6 May 2010 to elect members of West Oxfordshire District Council in Oxfordshire, England. One third of the council was up for election and the Conservative Party stayed in overall control of the council.

After the election, the composition of the council was:

- Conservative 40
- Liberal Democrats 7
- Labour 1
- Independent 1

== Background ==
After the last election in 2008 the Conservatives controlled the council with 40 councillors, compared to six for the Liberal Democrats, two Independents and one Labour 16 seats were contested in 2010, with the council election taking place at the same time as the 2010 general election.

The Conservatives stood a full 16 candidates, while the Liberal Democrats had 13, Labour had eight, Greens 4 and there was one Independent candidate.

== Election result ==
The Conservatives won 14 of the 16 seats contested to have 40 councillors. The Liberal Democrats gained a seat after winning the other two seats contested, while both Labour and an Independent were left with one seat. 10 of the 11 councillors who stood again were re-elected and overall turnout at the election was 72.45%.

West Oxfordshire local election result 2010
Party	Seats	Gains	Losses	Net gain/loss	Seats %	Votes %	Votes	+/−
Conservative	14	2	2	0	87.5	59.1	21,617	+2.6%
Liberal Democrats	2	2	1	+1	12.5	26.6	9,704	+4.1%
Labour	0	0	0	0	0	10.3	3,763	+2.4%
Green	0	0	0	0	0	2.8	1,029	-5.7%
Independent	0	0	1	-1	0	1.2	436	-2.3%

== Ward results ==
Ascott and Shipton
Party	Candidate	Votes	%	±%
Conservative	Hilary Hibbert-Biles	969	77.1	−1.5
Labour	John Gittings	288	22.9	+11.8
Majority		681	54.2	−13.2
Turnout		1,257	78.0	+27.7
Conservative hold		Swing		

Bampton and Clanfield
Party	Candidate	Votes	%	±%
Conservative	Martin Barrett	1,682	76.0	−2.4
Liberal Democrats	Brenda Churchill	532	24.0	+11.9
Majority		1,150	51.9	−14.4
Turnout		2,214	75.5	+30.3
Conservative gain from Independent		Swing		

Brize Norton and Shilton
Party	Candidate	Votes	%	±%
Conservative	Verena Hunt	691	61.3	−15.0
Independent	Shane Rae	436	38.7	+20.0
Majority		255	22.6	−35.0
Turnout		1,127	73.5	+30.5
Conservative hold		Swing		

Burford
Party	Candidate	Votes	%	±%
Conservative	Derek Cotterill	826	76.7	−3.1
Liberal Democrats	John Lilly	173	16.1	+1.2
Labour	David Heyes	78	7.2	+1.9
Majority		653	60.6	−4.2
Turnout		1,077	73.6	+23.6
Conservative hold		Swing		

Carterton North East
Party	Candidate	Votes	%	±%
Conservative	Henry Howard	1,655	66.7	−3.3
Liberal Democrats	Jonathan Biggs	825	33.3	+33.3
Majority		830	33.5	−14.7
Turnout		2,480	64.2	+46.4
Conservative hold		Swing		

Carterton North West
Party	Candidate	Votes	%	±%
Conservative	Maxine Crossland	1,560	70.3	−4.5
Labour	David Wesson	344	15.5	+15.5
Green	Anthony Barrett	314	14.2	+14.2
Majority		1,216	54.8	+5.2
Turnout		2,218	71.0	+38.0
Conservative hold		Swing		

Carterton South
Party	Candidate	Votes	%	±%
Conservative	Windell Walcott	1,642	78.0	+28.1
Liberal Democrats	Amanda Epps	464	22.0	−28.1
Majority		1,178	56.0	
Turnout		2,106	68.3	+34.8
Conservative hold		Swing		

Chipping Norton
Party	Candidate	Votes	%	±%
Conservative	Anne Roy-Barker	1,673	47.3	−2.1
Labour	Georgina Burrows	1,394	39.4	+8.9
Liberal Democrats	Christopher Tatton	467	13.2	+13.2
Majority		279	7.9	−11.0
Turnout		3,534	71.5	+30.4
Conservative hold		Swing		

Ducklington
Party	Candidate	Votes	%	±%
Conservative	Stephen Hayward	795	62.2	−4.9
Liberal Democrats	June Tayler	294	23.0	+11.5
Labour	Christopher Johnson	189	14.8	+1.0
Majority		501	39.2	−14.1
Turnout		1,278	77.0	+35.6
Conservative hold		Swing		

Eynsham and Cassington
Party	Candidate	Votes	%	±%
Liberal Democrats	Lawrence Poole	1,955	56.7	+11.0
Conservative	Mark Walker	1,492	43.3	−2.2
Majority		463	13.4	+13.2
Turnout		3,447	75.4	+34.9
Liberal Democrats gain from Conservative		Swing		

Freeland and Hanborough
Party	Candidate	Votes	%	±%
Conservative	Colin Dingwall	1,300	49.8	−0.1
Liberal Democrats	Michael Baggaley	1,013	38.8	−4.6
Labour	Robert Evans	169	6.5	−0.2
Green	Harriet Marshall	126	4.8	+4.8
Majority		287	11.0	+4.5
Turnout		2,608	76.9	+32.6
Conservative hold		Swing		

Standlake, Aston and Stanton Harcourt
Party	Candidate	Votes	%	±%
Conservative	Stephen Good	1,457	57.2	−1.5
Liberal Democrats	Elizabeth Maher	1,088	42.8	+1.5
Majority		369	14.5	−2.9
Turnout		2,545	78.0	+28.7
Conservative gain from Liberal Democrats		Swing		

The Bartons
Party	Candidate	Votes	%	±%
Conservative	William Goffe	823	70.8	−9.9
Liberal Democrats	Geoffrey Walton	339	29.2	+29.2
Majority		484	41.7	−19.8
Turnout		1,162	74.4	+36.4
Conservative hold		Swing		

Witney East
Party	Candidate	Votes	%	±%
Conservative	James Mills	2,246	55.5	−8.1
Liberal Democrats	Mark Balaam	762	18.8	+18.8
Labour	Duncan Enright	760	18.8	+0.9
Green	Paul Creighton	278	6.9	−4.5
Majority		1,484	36.7	−9.1
Turnout		4,046	70.5	+38.1
Conservative hold		Swing		

Witney South
Party	Candidate	Votes	%	±%
Conservative	Anthony Harvey	1,733	55.4	−3.0
Liberal Democrats	Paul Slamin	544	17.4	+17.4
Labour	Andrew Coles	541	17.3	+17.3
Green	Sandra Simpson	311	9.9	−2.6
Majority		1,189	38.0	+3.1
Turnout		3,129	67.6	+36.9
Conservative hold		Swing		

Woodstock and Bladon
Party	Candidate	Votes	%	±%
Liberal Democrats	Julian Cooper	1,248	53.8	+5.3
Conservative	Jill Dunsmore	1,073	46.2	−5.3
Majority		175	7.6	
Turnout		2,321	75.0	+31.4
Liberal Democrats gain from Conservative		Swing		
