= Oxford Bus Museum =

Coordinates: 51.825417°N 1.372171°W

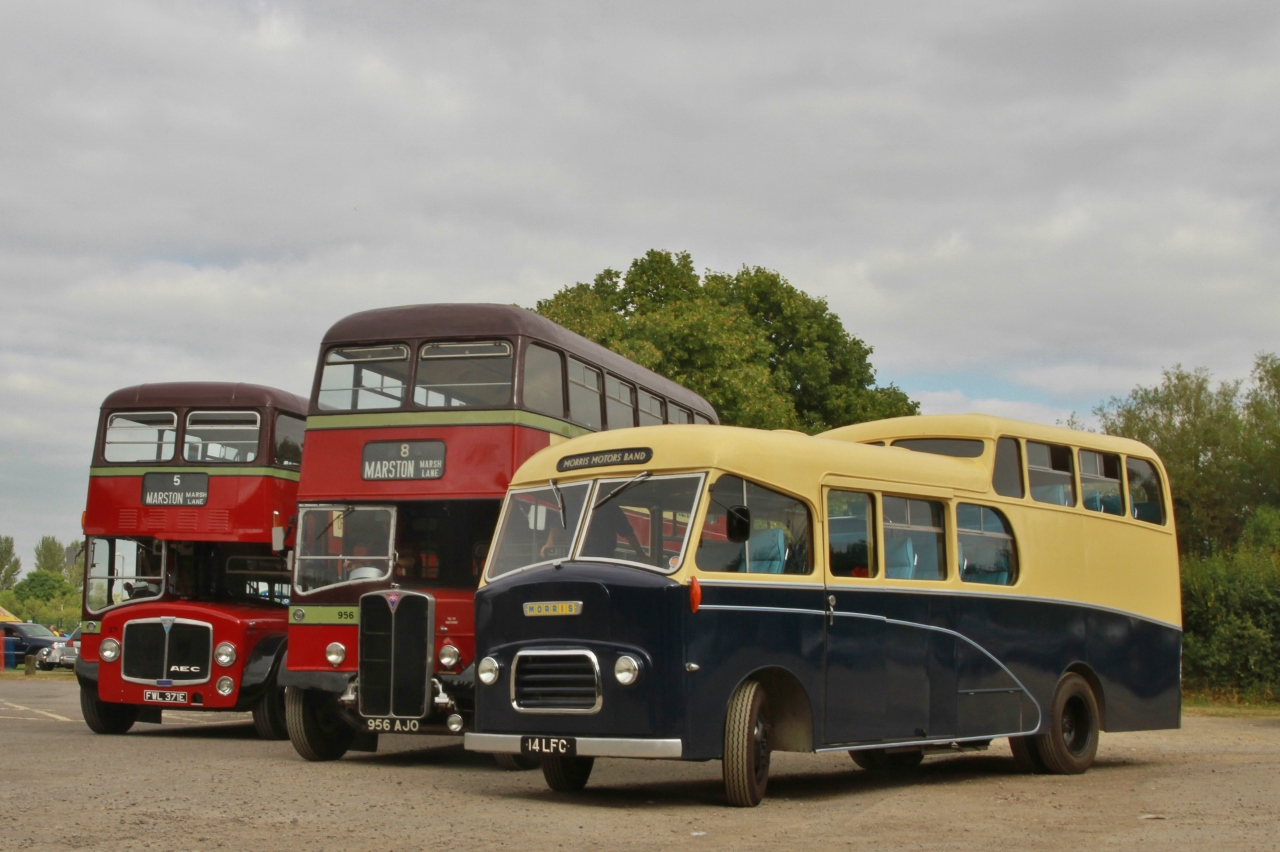
- City of Oxford Motor Services AEC buses (left) and Morris coach (right) from the museum

- Museum location in Oxfordshire
- Established: November 1967; 58 years ago
- Location: Long Hanborough, Oxfordshire, England
- Type: Transport museum
- Key holdings: 24 former City of Oxford Motor Services buses, many of them built by AEC
- Collections: buses, coaches, horse trams, Nuffield Organization motor vehicles
- Collection size: 57 vehicles
- Owner: The Oxford Bus Museum Trust
- Public transit access: • Hanborough railway station (including Sundays and Bank Holidays) • Stagecoach in Oxfordshire bus route S7 (Operating 7 days a week to Oxford and Witney)
- Parking: Free parking for 15 cars on site, plus nearby Hanborough railway station car park.
- Website: Oxford Bus Museum & Morris Motors Museum

The Oxford Bus Museum is a transport museum at Long Hanborough, West Oxfordshire, England, about 4 miles (6.4 km) northeast of Witney and 7 miles (11 km) northwest of the city of Oxford. The museum houses a collection of 40 historic buses and coaches, the remains of four horse trams and a replica City of Oxford Tramways Company tram.

The site includes the Morris Motors Museum, which has a collection of 12 Morris Motors cars and vans. The two museums' collections also include many smaller historical artifacts.

The museum is owned and operated by the Oxford Bus Museum Trust, a registered charity.

== Opening times and events ==
The museum is open to visitors throughout the year on Sundays, Wednesdays and bank holiday Mondays (excluding Christmas and Boxing Day week). In July and August it is open also on Saturdays.

In spring and summer there is a programme of events that includes free historic bus rides on selected Sundays and bank holiday Mondays. Please see the museum's website for current details.

== Buses, coaches and horse trams ==
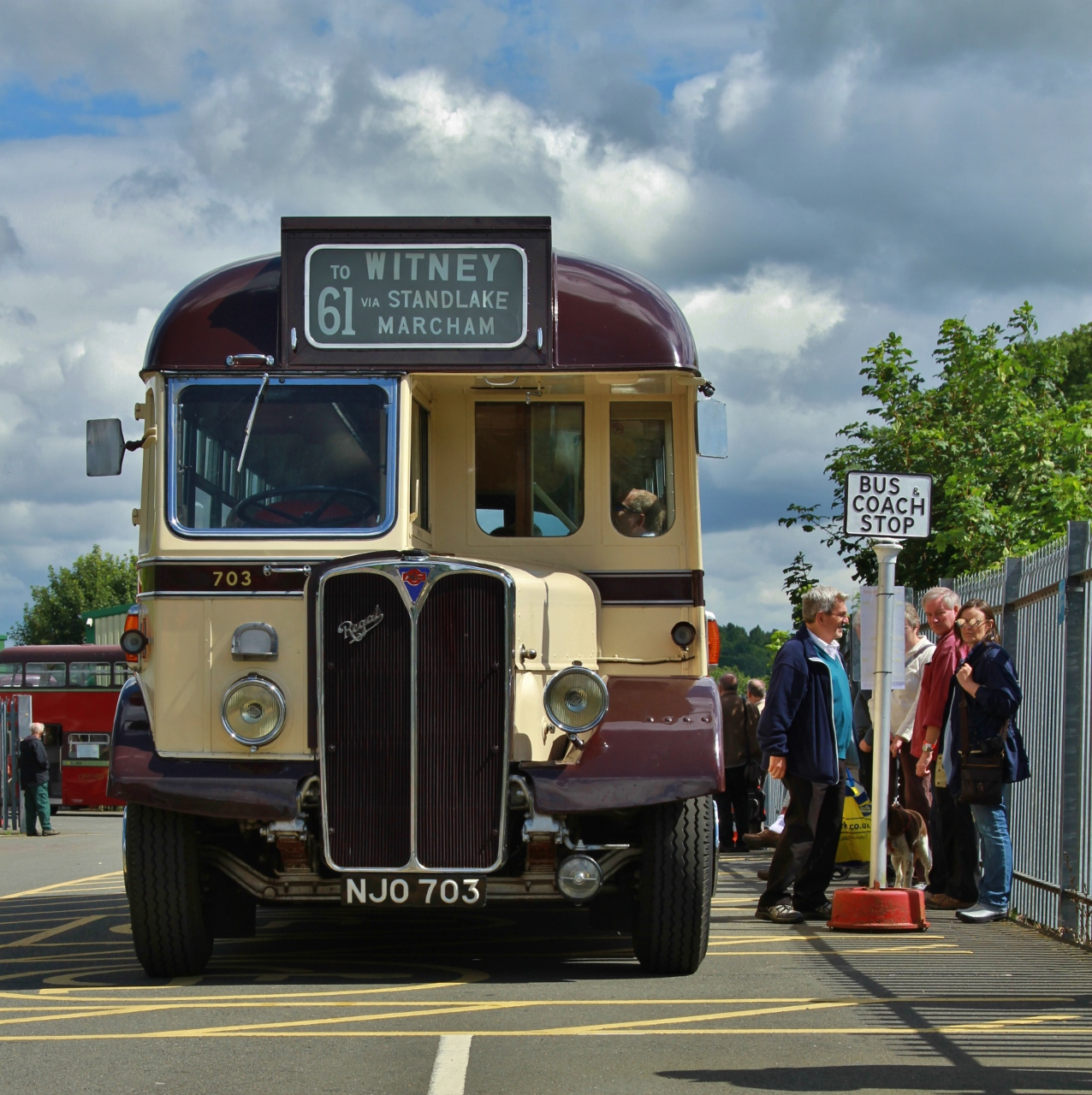
The museum's first bus, a 1949 AEC Regal III of City of Oxford Motor Services

The Oxford Bus Museum preserves the history of tram, bus and coach transport in Oxfordshire. It has a collection of 40 buses and coaches, the remains of four horse trams, and a complete replica of a City of Oxford horse tram built by museum volunteers. The buses and coaches range in age from a 1913 Commer WP3 to a 1999 Dennis Trident.

Several of the buses and coaches are in running condition and on certain days give free rides driven and crewed by museum volunteers.

24 of the museum's buses and coaches were operated by City of Oxford Motor Services (COMS) or its successors Midland Red (South) and Oxford Bus Company. From the 1930s to the 1970s COMS bought mostly AEC buses. The museum's collection reflects this by including 17 AECs: six Regals, six Regents, four Reliances and one Renown.

The collection also preserves buses from other local operators including Chiltern Queens and Thames Transit. Notable early vehicles include three Daimler Y buses from 1915 to 1917. There is also a unique coach built in 1961 for the Morris Motors factory brass band. It has a Morris Commercial FF chassis and a unique split-level body built by Wadham Stringer. The rear part of the passenger accommodation is raised, with a boot beneath it large enough to carry all of the band's brass musical instruments.

Exhibits include several bare chassis, and a Dennis Loline double-decker bus that has been sectioned to show how buses used to be built. There is also a restoration workshop with a public viewing gallery.

== Morris Motors Museum ==
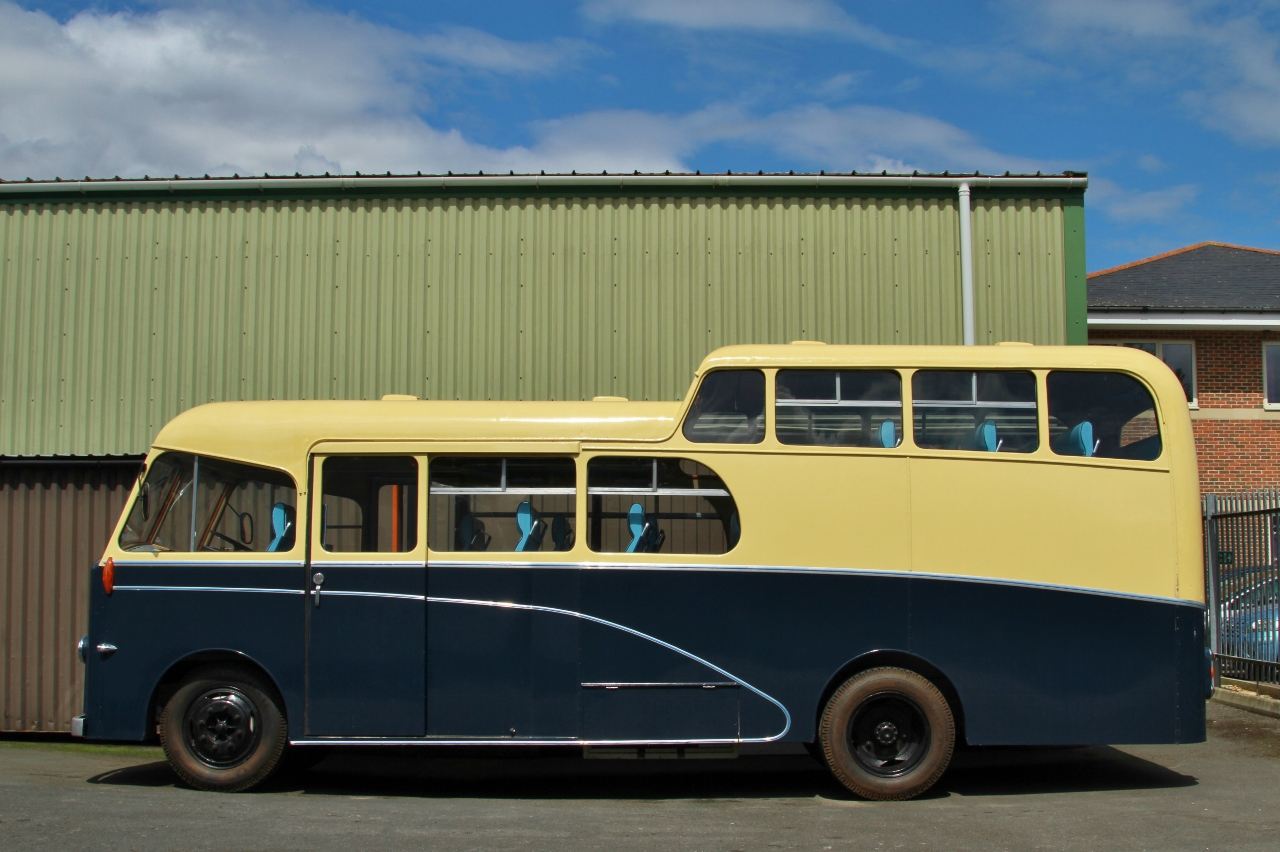
Morris Commercial FF coach with Wadham Stringer body, built in 1961 for the Morris Motors works band

The Morris Motors Museum has a collection of 11 cars and one van built by Morris Motors and other Nuffield Organization companies and their successors. They range in age from a 1928 Morris Oxford bullnose to a 1977 BMC Mini. The collection includes also a Z type van and a Nuffield tractor. The collection is displayed in a reconstruction of part of the former factory from Cowley, Oxford.

The museum also commemorates the life of the industrialist and philanthropist William Morris, 1st Viscount Nuffield, who founded the business in 1912, developed it into one of Britain's largest motor vehicle manufacturers and chaired it until its merger with Austin in 1952 to form the British Motor Corporation (BMC).

== Museum history ==
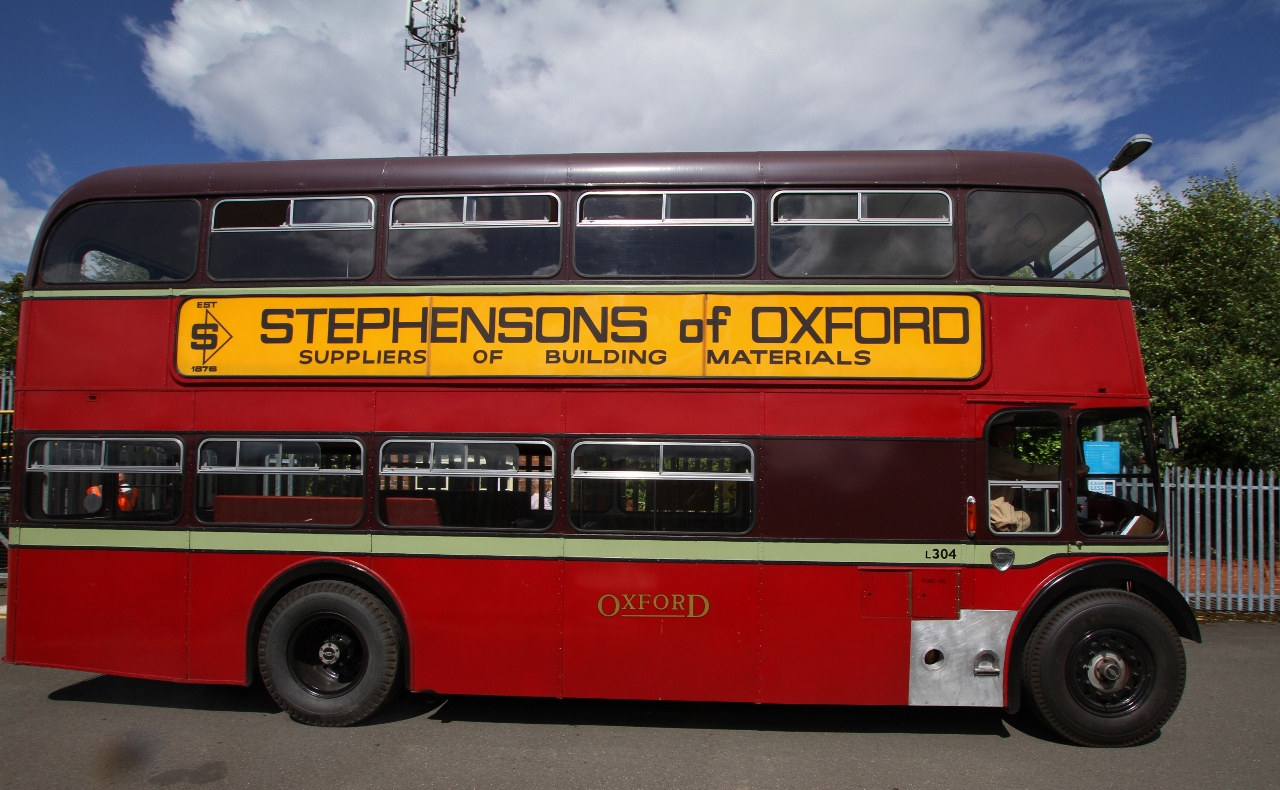
City of Oxford Motor Services 1961 Dennis Loline bus at the Museum

In November 1967 the Oxford Bus Preservation Syndicate bought its first vehicle, an AEC Regal III 1949 semi-coach, registration mark NJO 703, COMS fleet number 703. In 1984 the collection of vehicles was moved to its present site, the former goods yard of Hanborough railway station. New covered accommodation was built for the buses.

In the 1990s the museum established a collection policy which focuses on public service vehicles and smaller exhibits that operated within Oxfordshire. In 2001 its buildings were refurbished and expanded with support from the Heritage Lottery Fund.

The Morris Motors Museum opened on the site in 2004.

== Bibliography ==
- Jolly, Stephen; Taylor, Nick (2003). The Book of Oxford Buses and Trams. Oxford Bus Museum Trust. ISBN 0-9506739-2-7.
- Official Guide to the Oxford Bus Museum, home of the Morris Motors Museum. Long Hanborough: Oxford Bus Museum Trust. 2006.
