= Oxford Bus Company =

Bus operator in Oxfordshire, England

The City of Oxford Motor Services Limited

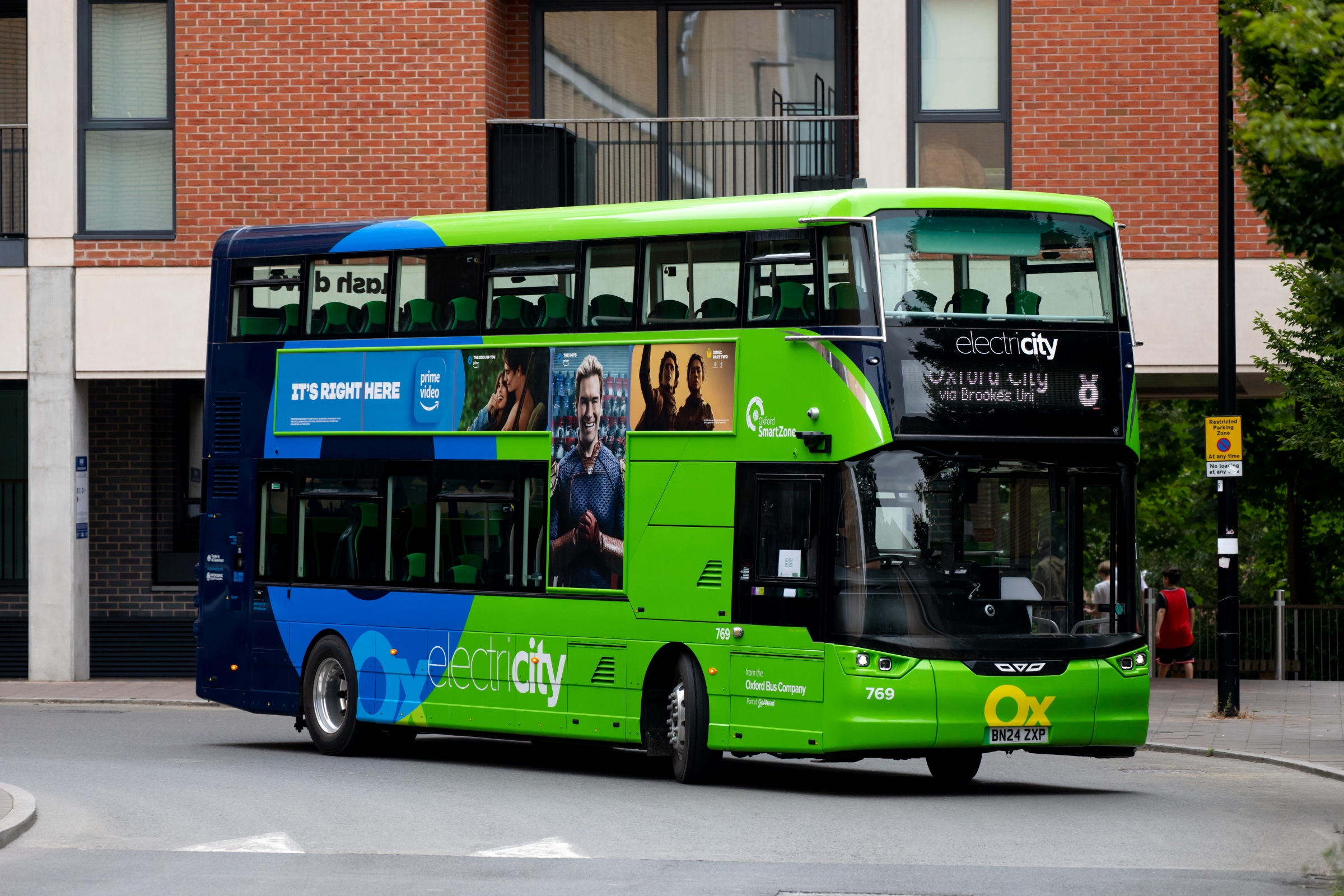
- Wright StreetDeck Electroliner battery electric bus at Westgate Oxford in July 2024
- Formerly: City of Oxford Motor Services, Limited (February–March 2011)
- Parent: Go-Ahead Group
- Founded: 1881; 145 years ago
- Headquarters: Cowley, Oxford, England, UK
- Service area: Oxfordshire
- Service type: Bus and coach services
- Destinations: Abingdon, Berinsfield, Bicester Village, Gatwick, Heathrow, Oxford, Thame, Watlington, Witney, Wytham
- Fleet: ~160 (November 2023)
- Chief executive: Luke Marion
- Website: Official website

The City of Oxford Motor Services Limited, trading as Oxford Bus Company, is a bus operator serving the city and surrounding area of Oxford, England. It is a subsidiary of the Go-Ahead Group and part of Go Thames Valley since July 2026.

== History ==
=== Horse trams and omnibuses ===
The City of Oxford and District Tramway Company served Oxford with horse-drawn trams from 1881. By 1898 its network served Abingdon Road, Banbury Road, Cowley Road, Walton Street and both Oxford and Oxford Rewley Road railway stations.

Horse-drawn omnibus services developed to complement the tramway network. By the early 20th century both Iffley Road and Woodstock Road were omnibus routes. On Saturdays only there were omnibuses from Headington to the city centre and from Cowley village to the tram terminus in Cowley Road.

In 1906 the City of Oxford Electric Tramways Company took over from the City of Oxford and District Tramway Company. It planned to electrify and expand the network, but was defeated by local opposition.

=== Motor buses ===
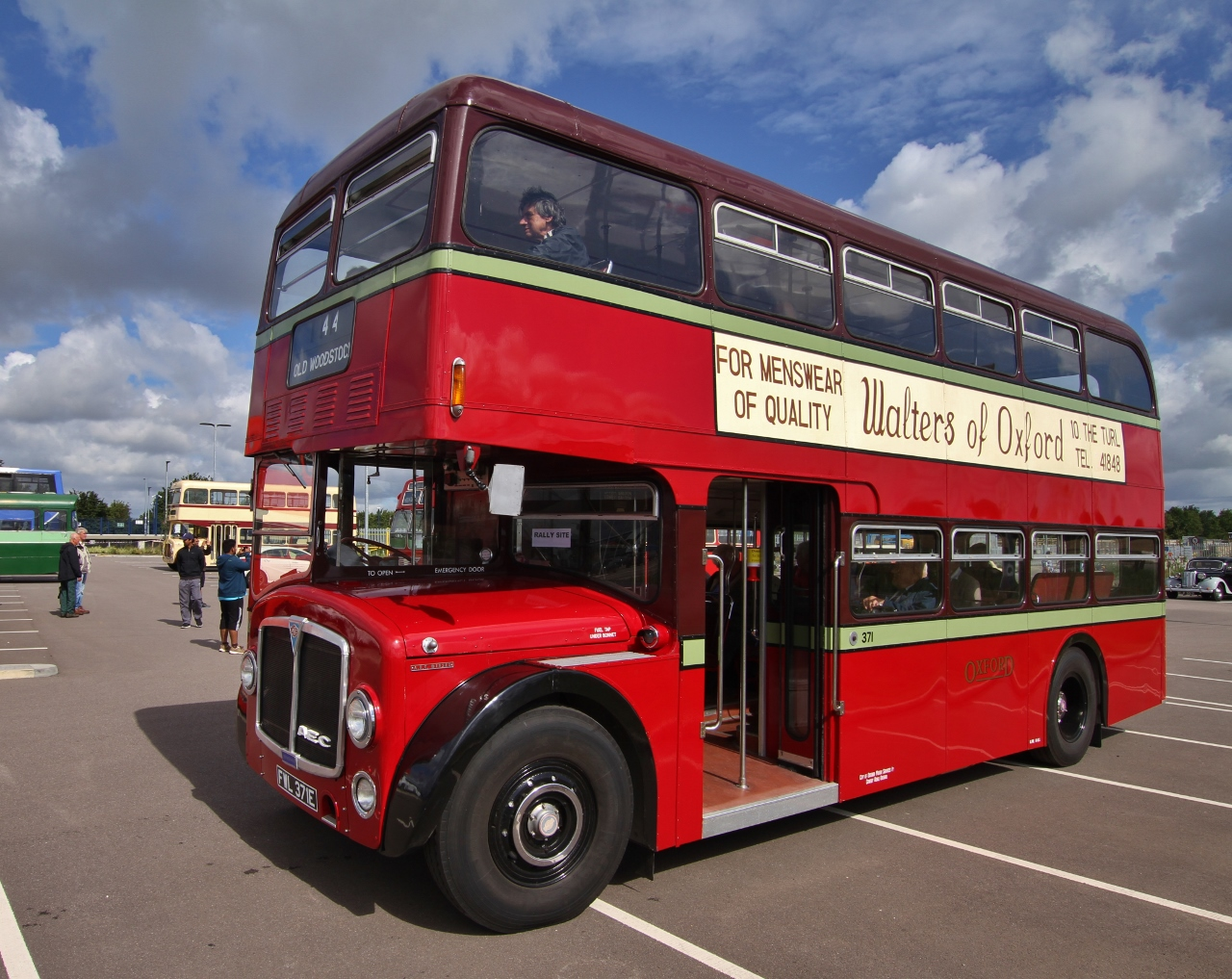
A preserved City of Oxford Motor Services AEC Renown

In 1913–14, and under threat of competition from William Morris and Frank Gray, the tram company replaced its trams and omnibuses with Daimler motor buses.

In 1921, the company was renamed City of Oxford Motor Services Limited (COMS). It continued to expand its operations into the surrounding countryside. From the 1930s, COMS was controlled by British Electric Traction, with the Great Western Railway having a minority shareholding. The fleet livery was red with maroon and pale green relief. Most of its buses were built on AEC chassis and running gear. Numerous former COMS buses have been preserved, including a large and notable collection at the Oxford Bus Museum in Long Hanborough in Oxfordshire.

In 1969 COMS became a subsidiary of the National Bus Company, commencing greater integration of city and country services. In 1971, the Oxford – London coach operator South Midland, which had been controlled by the neighbouring Thames Valley Traction company, was transferred to COMS and the fleet name for the entire operation became Oxford South Midland.

An acute problem for the operator was the competition for staff with Morris Motors, whose Cowley factory was near the Oxford garage. One response was to move to one person operation of buses in the 1970s.

In 1983, COMS was split into separate Oxford and South Midland units. Oxford Bus Company was allocated the Oxford city services and the London routes, and South Midland was allocated the remainder of the network. Both companies were subject to management buyouts. The South Midland company was soon resold to Thames Transit (later Stagecoach South Midlands), which introduced minibus competition. Oxford Bus Company tried to counter this with minibuses under the Oxford City Nipper brand name.

In 1990, Oxford Bus Company acquired the High Wycombe operations of the Bee Line, and ran them under the Wycombe Bus brand name. In March 1994, Oxford Bus Company was purchased by the Go-Ahead Group, with the company formally rebranded to The Oxford Bus Company and its city services being given Cityline branding a few months afterwards. In 2000, Go-Ahead sold the High Wycombe operation to Arriva. The company's long-established main depot in Cowley Road, Oxford was closed in 2004, replaced by a new depot opened in Watlington Road.

Go-Ahead bought Thames Travel in June 2011 and Carousel Buses in February 2012. These companies act as subsidiaries of the Oxford Bus Company, sharing management but retaining their separate identities.

In October 2019, it was announced that the X90 service between Oxford and London would be withdrawn from 4 January 2020, due to a 35% fall in passenger numbers since 2015 causing the route to be unprofitable.

In June 2023, Go-Ahead announced it had acquired the Gloucestershire independent Pulhams Coaches. The Pulhams operation, consisting of 90 buses, operates 22 bus services and 126 employees, will remain a separate brand under the management of the Oxford Bus Company.

== Brands ==
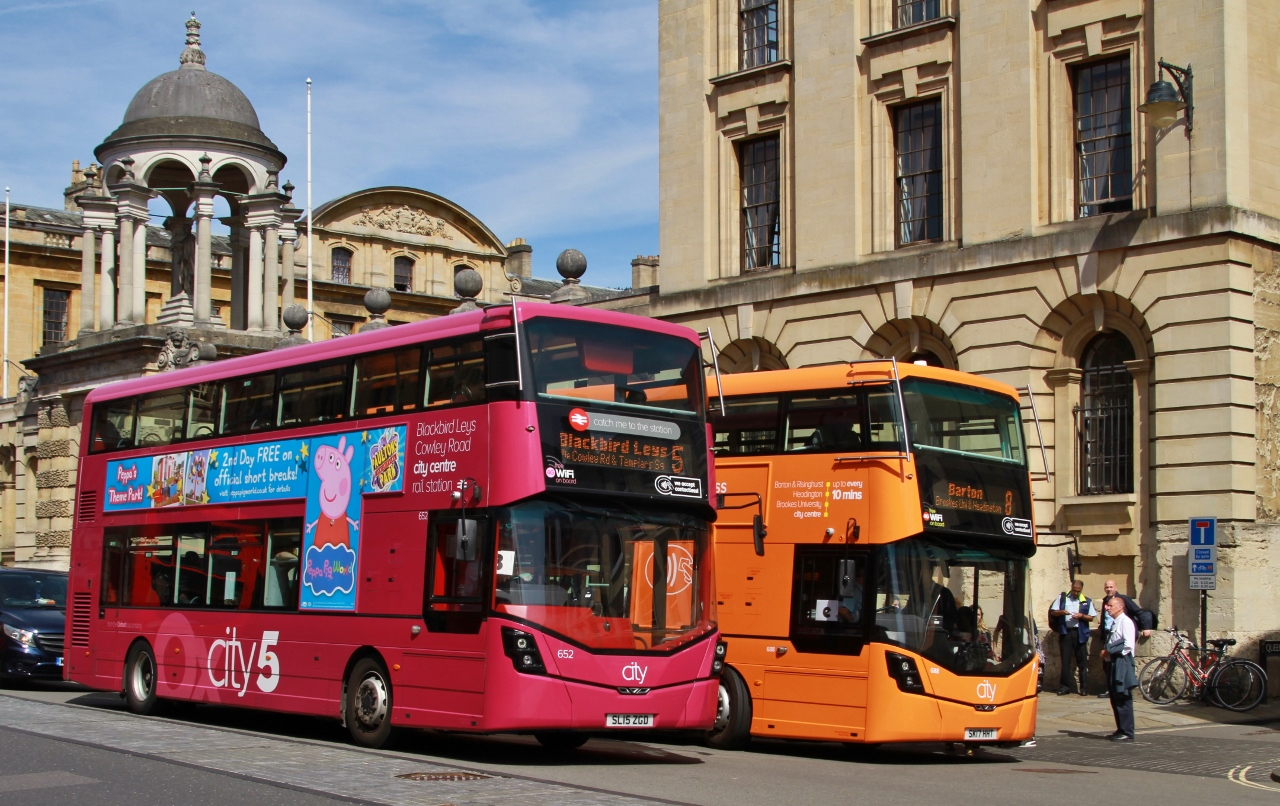
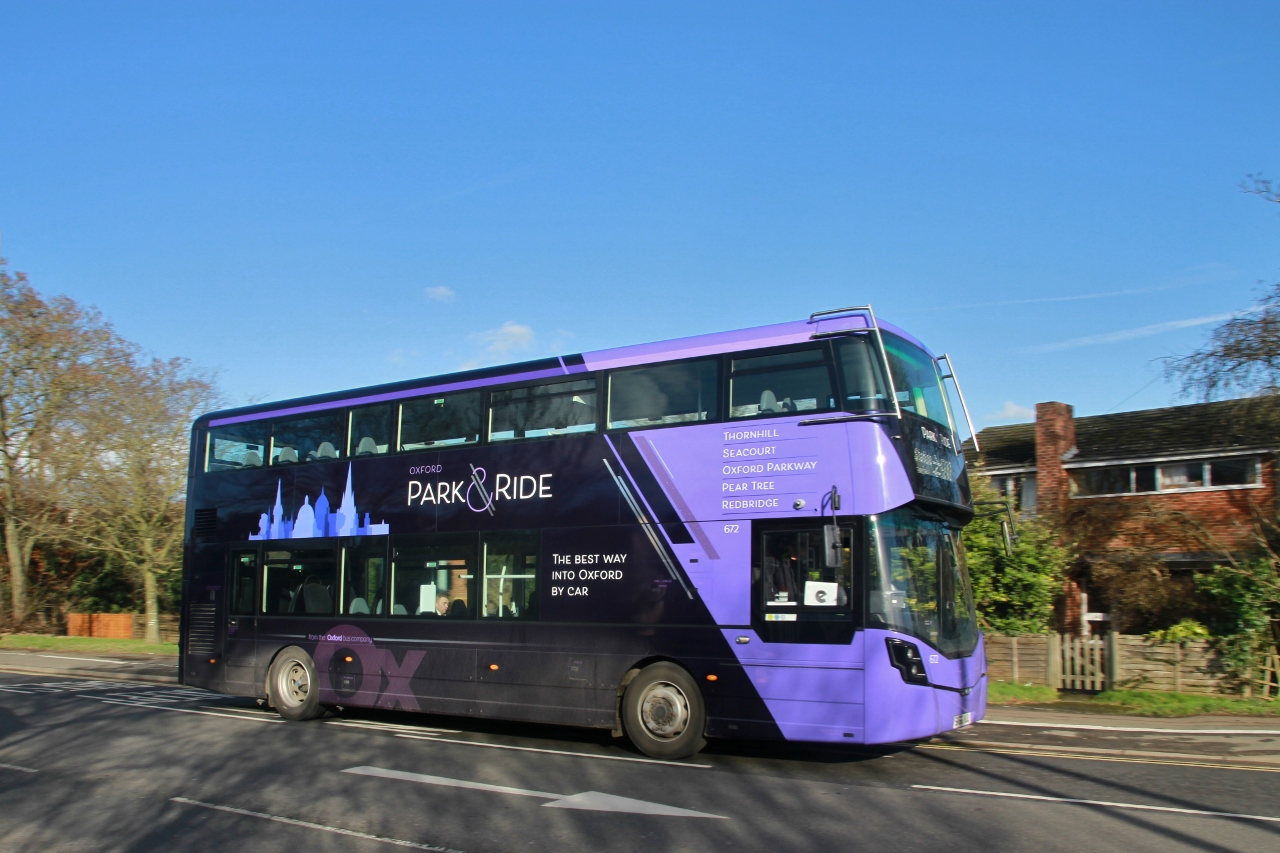
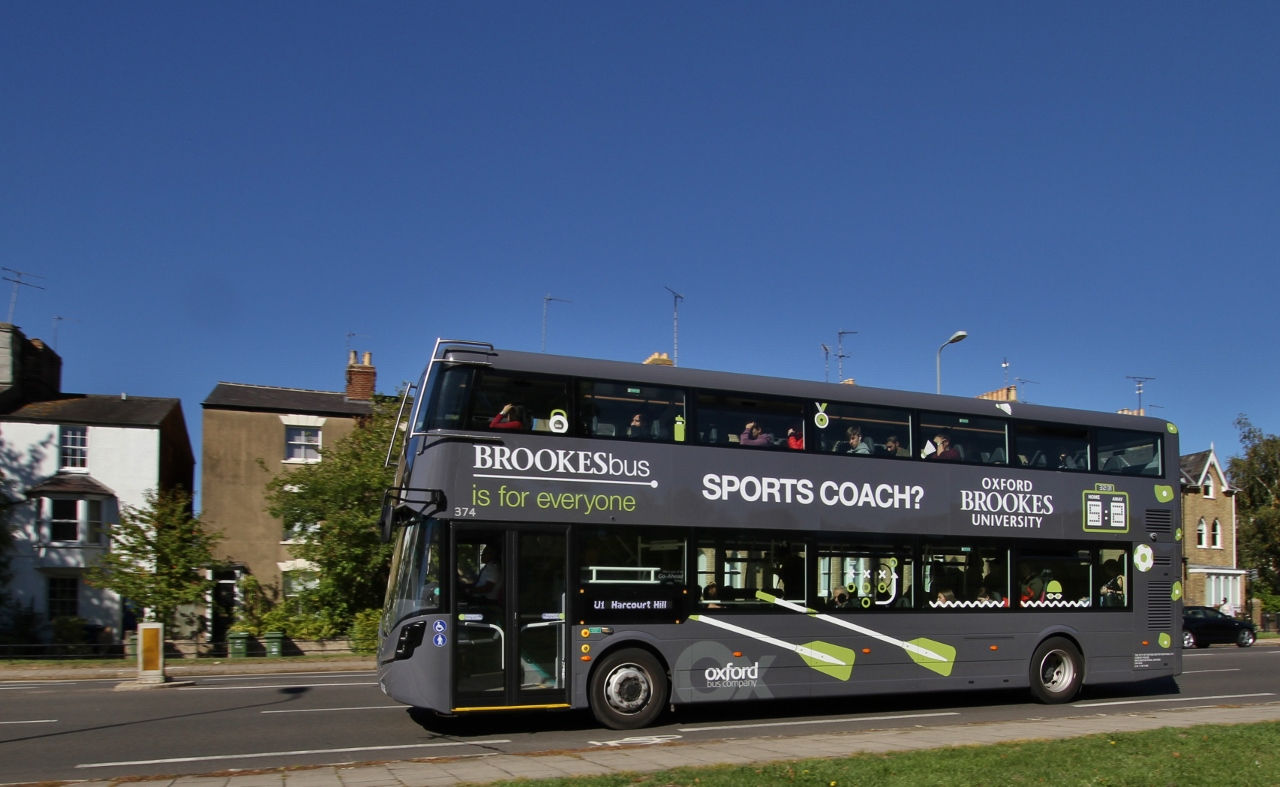
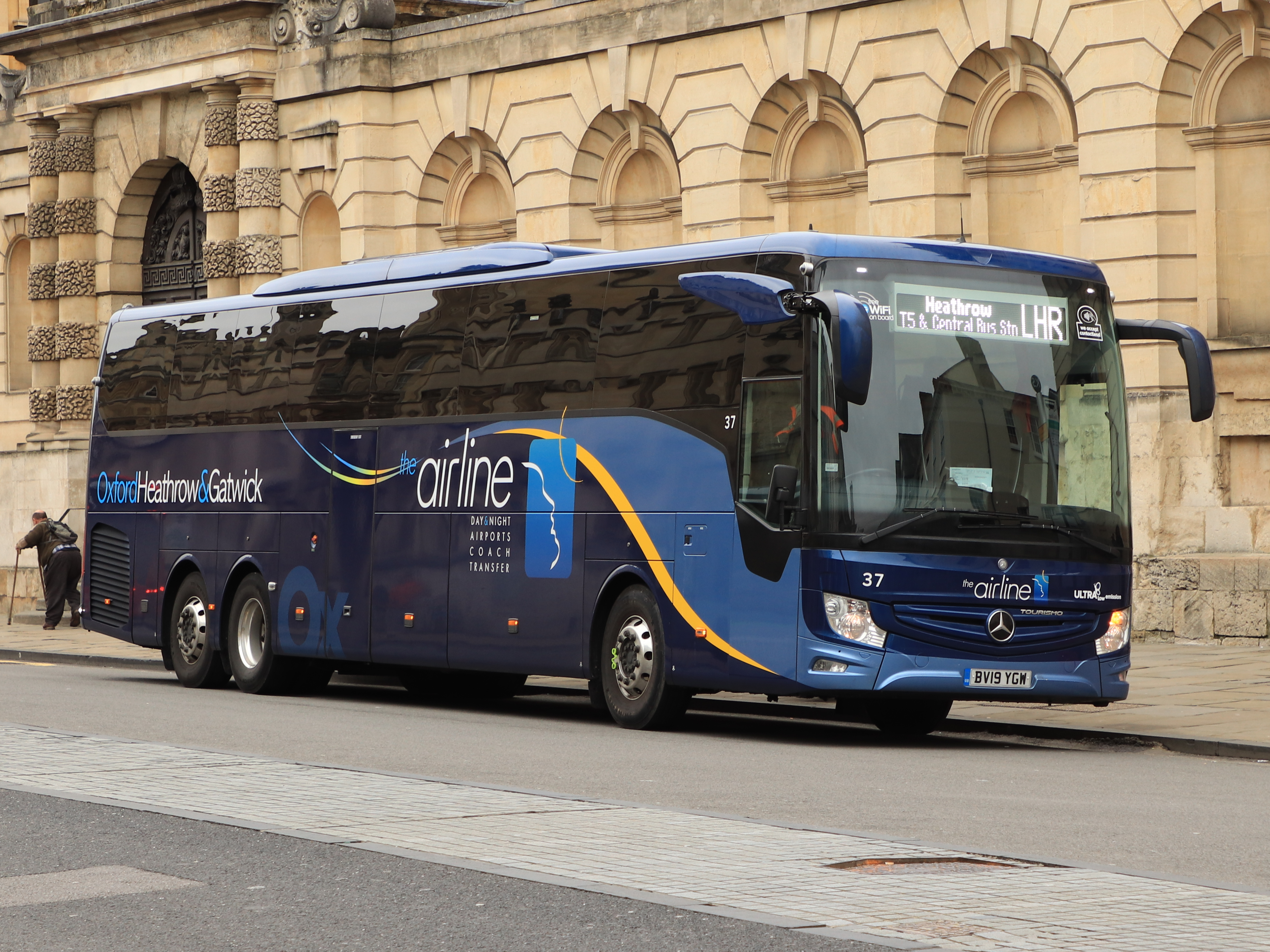
The various route-branded services operated by the Oxford Bus Company

As of 2023, the Oxford Bus Company currently operates services under four route brands:

=== City ===
A majority of Oxford Bus Company buses are branded in colour-coded 'City' branding for local bus services in and around the city of Oxford. This branding was first introduced in 2015 with the introduction of magenta Wright StreetDeck buses branded for the City5 before being progressively rolled out to ten other bus services. The scope of the 'City' brand has further expanded with the addition of two express routes and the City46, the latter of which is partially funded by restauranteur Raymond Blanc.

=== Park & Ride ===
Commencing operations on 10 December 1973 at the site of a former waste disposal site in Redbridge, the first permanent system of its type in the United Kingdom, Oxford's Park & Ride network serves Oxford city centre via two routes serving four peripheral park & ride sites around Oxford. Service 300 runs from the northern Pear Tree park & ride site to the southern Redbridge site, while service 400 runs from the western Seacourt site to the eastern Thornhill site. Most services are operated by Wright StreetDeck buses branded in black and purple liveries, 20 of which were originally purchased for use on the Park & Ride in 2016, replacing older Alexander Dennis Enviro400H buses used on the service.

Park & Ride service 400 was merged with the BROOKESbus U1 service to operate between Harcourt Hill and Wheatley via Oxford Brookes University in September 2022. It is operated using Wright StreetDeck Electroliner battery electric buses delivered in November 2023, branded in grey livery.

=== The Airline ===
'The Airline' is an express coach service linking Oxford with London Heathrow Airport every twenty minutes and Gatwick Airport every hour, with both services operating every day of the year. The service is operated by eighteen Mercedes-Benz Tourismo coaches acquired in 2019 and 2023, two of which were wrapped in advertisements for The Ashmolean museum in Oxford city centre.

=== BROOKESbus ===
BROOKESbus was a network of services providing bus links between the campuses and student halls of the Oxford Brookes University, open to passengers regardless of whether they are students at the university. The service was initially launched in 2003 by Stagecoach in Oxfordshire with a fleet of eight buses, however the Oxford Bus Company gained the contract to operate the service in 2009, with the BROOKESbus network being continuously operated by the company since.

On 22 May 2025, Oxford Bus Company announced via its website that the BROOKESbus brand would come to an end on 30 June 2025. The university decided not to renew the contract and to allocate funding elsewhere. All ticketing options (Brookes Calender, Academic, Semester and Summer) were removed from sale with immediate effect, though existing tickets continued to be valid until their expiry.

The routes marketed under the BROOKESbus brand (100 and 400) continue to run; however, the 400 bus no longer serves Harcourt Hill Campus, being replaced by the 4B service as of 31st August 2025.

== Fleet ==
As of November 2023, Oxford Bus Company's fleet consists of up to 160 buses, minibuses and coaches, a majority of which are operated on local bus services in and around Oxford.

The company currently operates 104 battery electric buses produced by Wrightbus. 91 buses from this order are Wright StreetDeck Electroliner double deckers, eight of them being open-top examples for the company's City Sightseeing operations, and the remaining five buses from this order being Wright GB Kite Electroliner single deck buses. The first 21 battery-electric StreetDecks from this order were delivered in November 2023 for service on the BROOKESbus park and ride service, with an event being held in January 2024 to celebrate the launch of Oxford's electric bus fleet, in conjunction with an order by Stagecoach West for 55 Alexander Dennis Enviro400EVs for services in and around the city.

=== Bus location technology ===
All Oxford Bus Company buses and coaches have automatic vehicle location (AVL) equipment installed which works via GPS technology. The AVL equipment installed on each bus or coach gives geographical location to within a few metres and is updating central control room every few seconds. This information technology can therefore be seen in real time at the central control room, which helps in managing the fleet.

The AVL equipment is also coupled to a real-time passenger information system at over 250 bus stop display screens around Oxford City and surrounding towns, and via a smartphone app. This coupled information technology system gives the public "predicted times" of bus and coach services around Oxford City and surrounding towns.

Oxfordshire County Council also uses this information technology to provide traffic-light priority for buses at some road junctions.

The real-time passenger information system is managed by OxonTime, which is a partnership between various bus companies and Oxfordshire County Council.

=== 'Brand the Bus' initiative ===
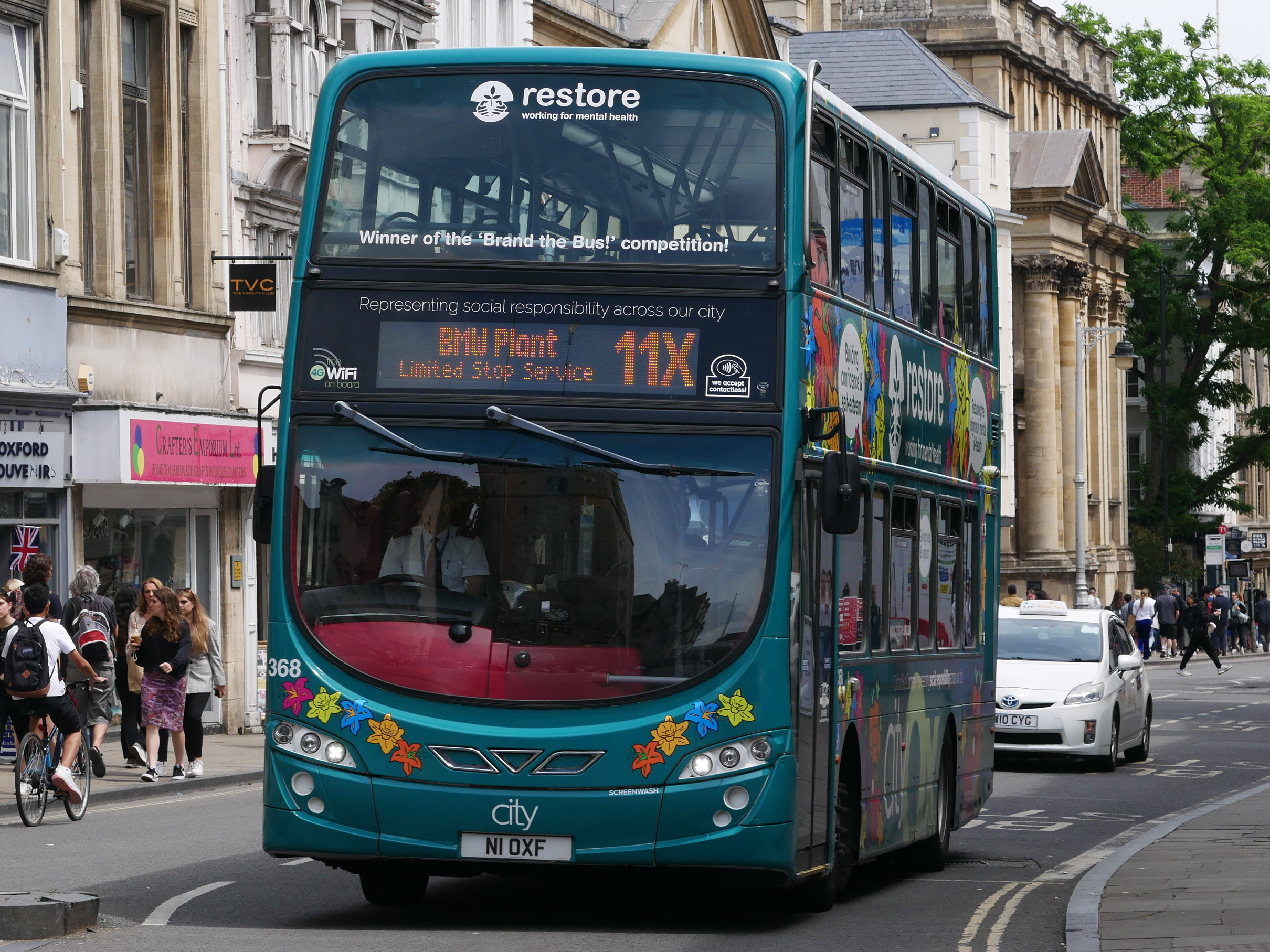
An Oxford Bus Company bus in the livery of 2022 Brand the Bus winner 'Restore'

Since 2018, Oxford Bus Company has run an annual initiative named 'Brand the Bus', in which local charities and causes in Oxford submit designs for a charitable all-over advertisement to be applied to an Oxford Bus Company double-decker bus for a two-year period. The top ten designs are voted on by the general public before being submitted by an internal judging panel to select an overall winner. Two organisations that had advertised on Oxford Bus Company buses in 2018 prior to the initiative being launched were Oxford Pride and the Oxfordshire Prostate Cancer Support Group.

The past winners of the 'Brand the Bus' initiative were:

- 2018-2019: GirlGuiding Oxfordshire
- 2019-2020: Home Start Oxford
- 2020-2021: Blue Skye Thinking
- 2021-2022: Restore
- 2022-2023: SeeSaw
- 2023-2024: Oxford Hospitals Charity
- 2024-2025: One-Eighty
- 2025-2026: Sobell House

== See also ==
- List of bus operators of the United Kingdom

== Bibliography ==
- Hart, Harold W (1972). "The Horse-Trams of Oxford, 1881–1914" (PDF). Oxoniensia. XXXVII. Oxford: 221–225. ISSN 0308-5562.
