= City of Oxford Tramways Company =

English tramway operator

City of Oxford and District Tramway Company
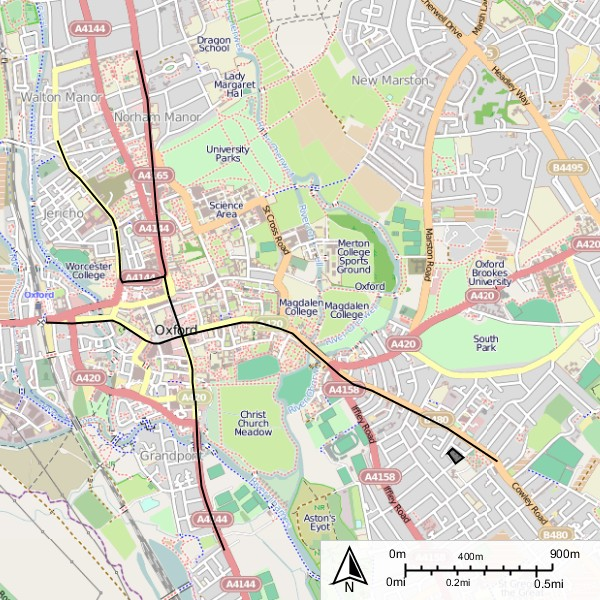
- Map of the City of Oxford Tramways

Operation
- Locale: Oxford
- Open: 1 December 1881; 144 years ago
- Close: 7 August 1914; 112 years ago
- Status: Closed
- Routes: 3

Infrastructure
- Track gauge: 4 ft (1,219 mm)
- Propulsion system: Horse
- Depots: Leopold Street, Oxford
- Stock: 19 double-deck cars (1914)

Statistics
- 56,000 a week (1914)

The City of Oxford and District Tramway Company and its successor the City of Oxford Electric Traction Company operated a horse-drawn passenger tramway service in Oxford between 1881 and 1914. The tramway was unusual for having a track gauge of only 4 feet (1.219 m).

== Network and fleet ==
The City of Oxford and District Tramway Company was incorporated under the Oxford Tramways Order 1879 in accordance with the Tramways Act 1870 (33 & 34 Vict. c. 78). Its initial capital was £42,000 raised by an issue of £10 shares.

The first route linked Oxford railway station and Oxford Rewley Road railway station with Cowley Road via Queen Street, Carfax and High Street. Its eastern terminus was at the junction with Magdalen Road. Major General Charles Scrope Hutchinson from the Board of Trade inspected it on 28 November 1881. It opened to the public on 1 December 1881.

On 28 January 1882 a second route was opened from Carfax to Rackham Lane via Cornmarket Street, Magdalen Street, St Giles Street and Banbury Road. On 15 July 1884 a third route was opened to Kingston Road via Beaumont Street and Walton Street. On 15 March 1887 a route was opened from Carfax to Lake Street, New Hinksey via St Aldate's and Abingdon Road. On 5 November 1898 the Banbury Road route was extended to Summertown, terminating at the junction with South Parade.

By 1895 the company had a fleet of 16 single-deck trams. By 1910 its fleet was 19 double-deck trams and it had 150 horses. Its depot and stables were off Leopold Street at SP53010548.

Most of the network was single track with passing loops. The network had no fixed tram stops: drivers and conductors were ordered to look out for likely passengers. Trams were timetabled to run every 15 to 30 minutes. In its latter years the network carried some three million passengers a year, mostly for one penny fares.

The network had a speed limit of 8 mph (13 km/h). The branch to Kingston Road had tight curves at the road junctions at either end of Beaumont Street. Here there was occasionally a derailment, with a tram colliding with either the Taylor Institution building or railings outside Worcester College.

A horse-drawn omnibus network developed to serve those parts of Oxford that lacked tramways. In the tramways' latter years, omnibuses operated a route along Iffley Road from Iffley Turn to Broad Street and a route from Wolvercote along Woodstock Road to Carfax. On Saturdays only there was a omnibus service from Cowley village to connect with trams at their Magdalen Road terminus. Later there was a Saturday-only omnibus service from Headington to Carfax.

== Electrification proposal ==
Section 43 of the Tramways Act 1870 (33 & 34 Vict. c. 78) provided for private companies to build and operate tramways on a 21-year concession. As the Oxford company opened its first line in 1881 this concession ended in 1902. Oxford Corporation had the option to either buy out and take over the tramway or renew the concession.

A meeting in Oxford in May 1902 considered proposals for the corporation both to take over the tramways and to electrify them via a conduit in the road surface. But political consensus was not achieved, and the corporation made a new agreement that the company would extend the network and continue operation until 1907.

In 1905 the corporation changed its mind and decided both to take over the tramway and have it electrified. In September 1905 it reached agreement with the company to take over its assets and operations from 31 December 1906. On 6 December 1906 a new City of Oxford Electric Traction Company was incorporated to this end. It was a subsidiary of the National Electric Construction Company.

Oxford and District Tramways Act 1907
- Act of Parliament
- Parliament of the United Kingdom
- Long title: An Act to vest the existing tramways in the city of Oxford in the City of Oxford Electric Tramways Limited and to authorise that Company to remove and reconstruct the same and to construct additional tramways in and adjacent to the city and for other purposes.
- Citation: 7 Edw. 7. c. cxlii

Dates
- Royal assent: 21 August 1907

Text of statute as originally enacted

Parliament debated the Oxford Tramways Bill 1906 and then passed the Oxford and District Tramways Act 1907 (7 Edw. 7. c. cxlii) granting powers to rebuild and electrify the network, double track much of its track, extend its existing routes and build five new routes. Proponents now favoured the electrification by the ground-level stud contact system instead of the conduit system. There was a strong recommendation that the rebuilding should include widening the track gauge from 4 feet to the standard gauge of 4 feet 8 1/2 inches (1.435 m).

Electrification was opposed by Oxford academics and others. No overhead wires were proposed, but objectors said they objected to overhead electric wires in High Street. The commercial photographer Henry Taunt opposed the bill not only because he disliked overhead wires, but also because he alleged that the corporation had recently overspent on other large projects, and hence that buying and electrifying the tramway would burden Oxford's ratepayers.

The rebuilding, electrification and network expansion scheme was defeated. Proponents tried to revive it in 1909 and 1911, but without success. Statutory powers under the Oxford and District Tramways Act 1907 lapsed in 1912.

== Closure and legacy ==
The company suffered a strike by its tram workers in 1913.

William Morris and Frank Gray started a motor bus service in direct competition with the tram and without a licence. The tramway company responded by replacing its trams with motor buses. The last horse trams ran in 1914. In 1921 the company was renamed City of Oxford Motor Services.

No Oxford tram survives intact. Oxford Bus Museum at Long Hanborough preserves parts of three of the company's double-deck trams dating from 1882, 1887 and 1898, in unrestored condition.

The poet John Betjeman (1906–84), who was a Magdalen College undergraduate 1925–28, refers to the tramway in his poem On an old-fashioned water-colour of Oxford, published in 1959:

But we will mount the horse-tram's upper deck...
Bound for the Banbury Road in time for tea.

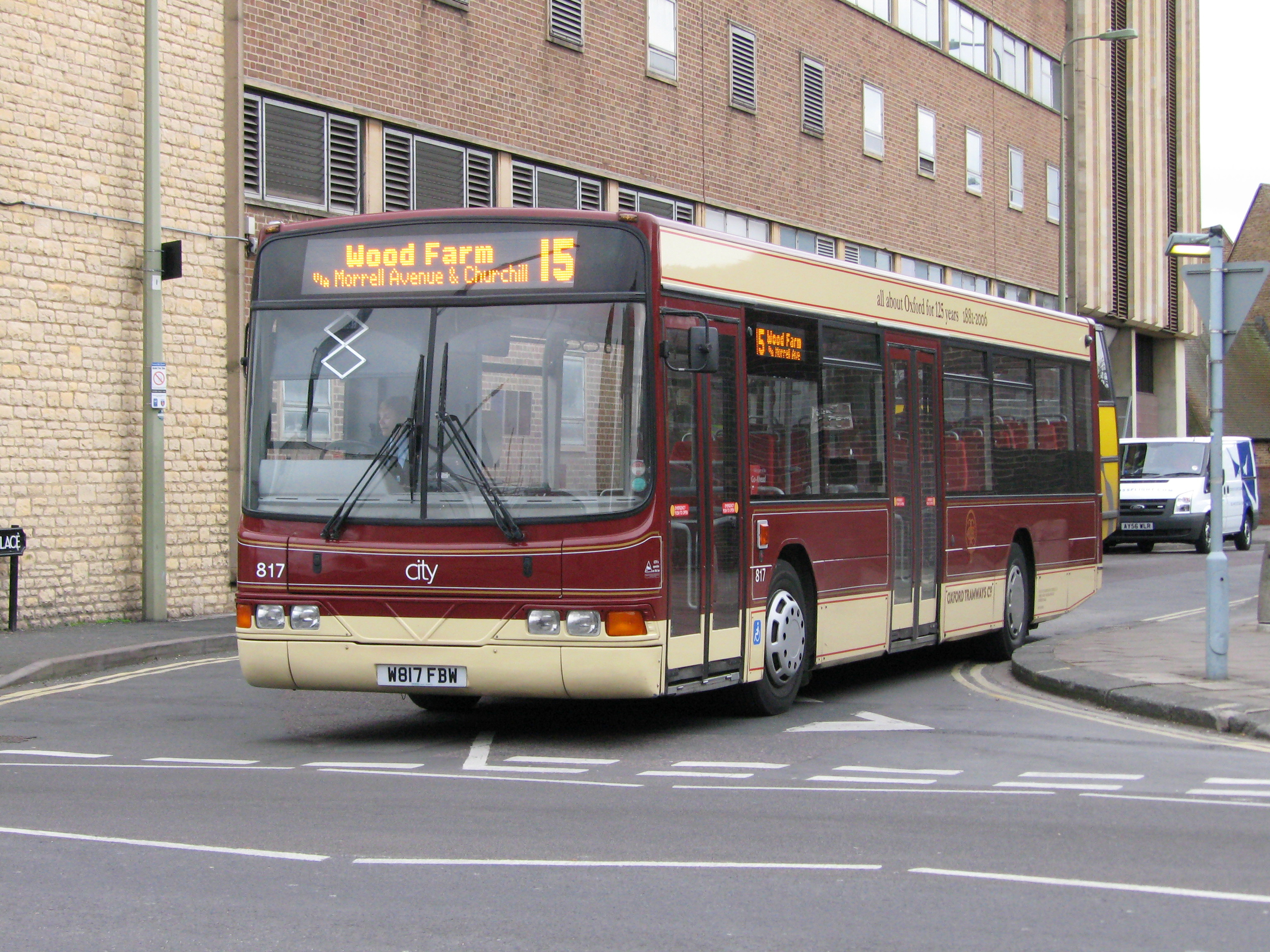
Oxford Bus Company bus in Butterwyke Place in 2008 in the livery of the former tramway

In 2006 Oxford Bus Company commemorated the tramways' 125th anniversary by painting one of its single-deck buses in the tram company's maroon and cream livery.

== Sources ==
- Graham, Malcolm (1973). "His Character and Personality". Henry Taunt of Oxford: A Victorian Photographer. Headington: Oxford Illustrated Press. ISBN 0-902280-14-7.
- Hart, Harold W (1972). "The Horse-Trams of Oxford, 1881–1914" (PDF). Oxoniensia. XXXVII. Oxford: Oxfordshire Architectural and Historical Society: 221–225. ISSN 0308-5562.
