= Hanborough =

Coordinates: 51.817°N 1.377°W

- Civil parish
- Location within Oxfordshire
- Civil parish: Hanborough
- District: West Oxfordshire
- Shire county: Oxfordshire
- Region: South East
- Country: England
- Sovereign state: United Kingdom
- Post town: Witney
- Postcode district: OX29
- Dialling code: 01993
- Police: Thames Valley
- Fire: Oxfordshire
- Ambulance: South Central
- UK Parliament: Bicester and Woodstock

Hanborough is a civil parish in West Oxfordshire. The parish includes the villages of Church Hanborough (Ordnance Survey grid reference SP4212) and Long Hanborough (OS grid ref. SP4114). The village of Freeland was transferred from Eynsham civil parish to Hanborough in 1932 and then detached to form a separate civil parish in 1948. Both Church Hanborough and Long Hanborough are served by Hanborough railway station.

== Sources ==
- Baggs, A.P.; Blair, W.J.; Chance, Eleanor; Colvin, Christina; Cooper, Janet; Day, C.J.; Selwyn, Nesta; Townley, S.C. (1990). Crossley, Alan; Elrington, C.R. (eds.). Victoria County History: A History of the County of Oxford, Volume 12: Wootton Hundred (South) including Woodstock. pp. 158–159. ISBN 978-0-19-722774-9.
