= Combe, Oxfordshire =

Village in Oxfordshire, England

Coordinates: 51.840°N 1.403°W

Combe
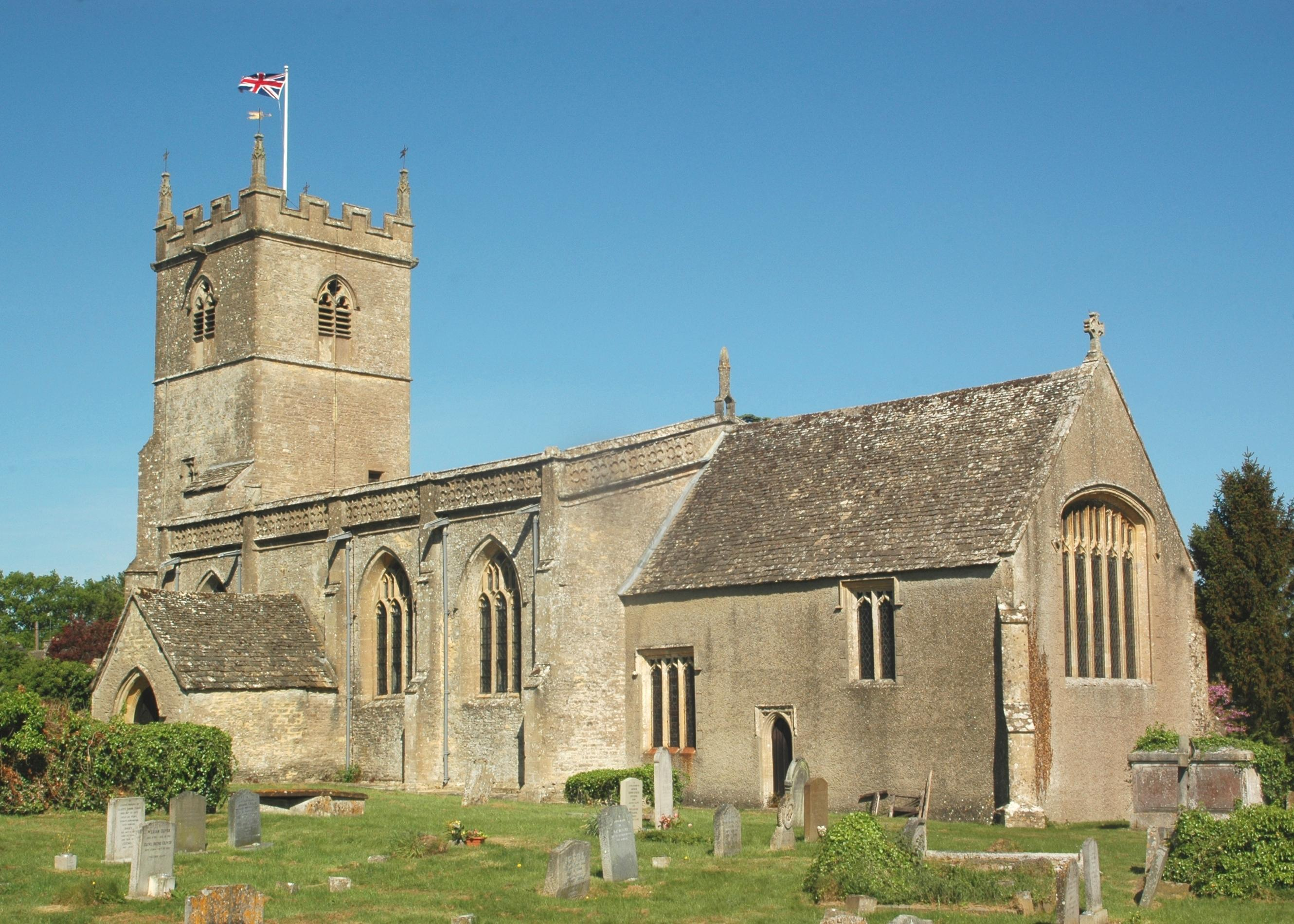
- St Laurence's Church, Combe Longa

- Location within Oxfordshire
- Population: 768 (2011 Census)
- OS grid reference: SP4116
- Civil parish: Combe
- District: West Oxfordshire
- Shire county: Oxfordshire
- Region: South East
- Country: England
- Sovereign state: United Kingdom
- Post town: Witney
- Postcode district: OX29
- Dialling code: 01993
- Police: Thames Valley
- Fire: Oxfordshire
- Ambulance: South Central
- UK Parliament: Bicester and Woodstock
- Website: Combe Parish Council

Combe is a village and civil parish about 5 miles (8 km) northeast of Witney in Oxfordshire. It is bounded to the south and southwest by the River Evenlode, to the northwest partly by the course of the Akeman Street Roman road and partly by a road parallel with it, and to the east by the boundary of Blenheim Great Park. The 2011 Census recorded the parish's population as 768.

== Church and chapel ==
=== Church of England ===
The Church of England parish church of St Laurence dates from the 12th century but was rebuilt in the late 14th century for Eynsham Abbey. Its interior has several 15th-century wall paintings, which were rediscovered during restoration work in 1892. St Laurence's is a Grade I listed building. St Laurence's bell tower has a ring of six bells, cast by John Taylor & Co of Loughborough in 1924, and a clock built by John Smith and Sons of Derby in 1948.

=== Methodist ===
Combe has had a Methodist congregation since about the 1770s, when it used to meet in a house called Wedgehook in Bolton's Lane. Three meeting houses were registered in Combe: one in East End in 1823, and two elsewhere in the village in 1827 and 1829. Combe's first Methodist chapel was a Wesleyan one built in 1835 at the eastern edge of the village. Methodism in Britain suffered a schism that led to the founding of the Wesleyan Reform Union in 1859, and as a result the congregation at Combe split.

A United Methodist Free chapel in front of a row of cottages southwest of the village green was built in 1861–63 and enlarged in 1882. In 1893 the original Wesleyan chapel at the east end of the village was rebuilt, with the 9th Duke of Marlborough laying the foundation stone. In 1932 Britain's three largest Methodist denominations merged to form what is now the Methodist Church of Great Britain. Combe's congregation united to use the Wesleyan chapel at the east end of the village. The United Free Methodist chapel near the village green was closed and is now a private house.

== Economic and social history ==
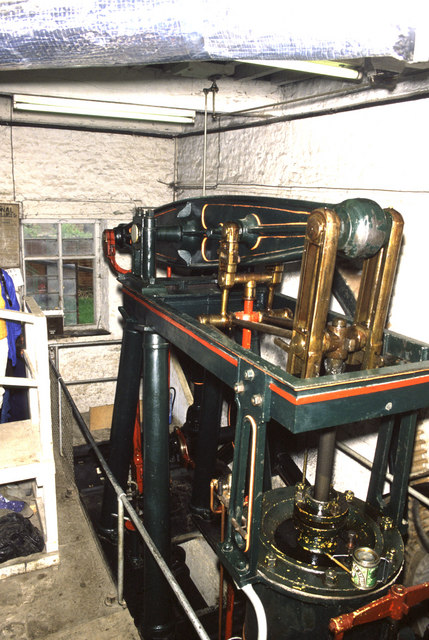
The 1852 rotative beam engine of Combe sawmill

Combe House was built in the 16th or early 17th century and extended in about 1800 or 1812. It used to be the vicarage. Combe Bridge is a stone bridge on the minor road linking the village with Long Hanborough. It spans the Evenlode where the river forms the boundary with Hanborough parish. The bridge was rebuilt in the 18th century with two arches for the river and flood arches either side.

The Duke of Marlborough's Blenheim estate adjoins the village. The estate's former sawmill, Combe Mill, is now a working museum. It was originally powered by a leat from the Evenlode that turned a breastshot water wheel. It also has a steam-powered rotative beam engine driven by a Cornish boiler, both of which were added in 1852. In 1926 the old water wheel was replaced with a more efficient Poncelet wheel. The mill is now a Grade II* listed building.

The Oxford, Worcester and Wolverhampton Railway was built along the Evenlode valley through the southern part of the parish and opened in 1852. It was operated by the Great Western Railway, which took it over in 1863. In 1935 the GWR opened Combe Halt, where the line crosses the road to Long Hanborough near the sawmill. It is now Combe railway station and the railway is the Cotswold Line. The 75th anniversary of Combe Halt's creation was celebrated with the children of Combe C of E Primary school using the line to travel to Worcester.

== Amenities ==
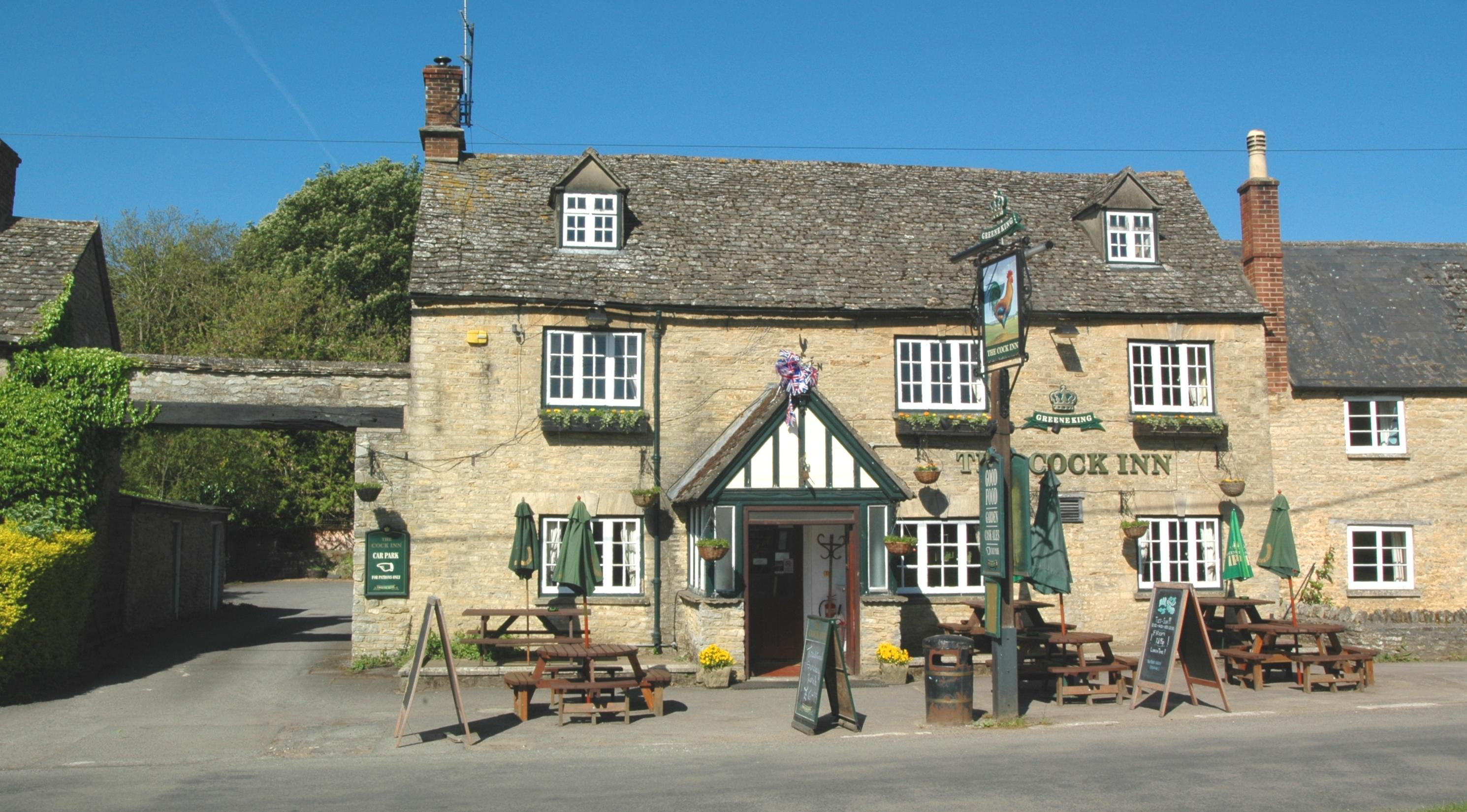
The Cock Inn public house

Combe has a public house, the Cock Inn, which has been closed for the past three years. The pub was built late in the 17th or early in the 18th century. It is beside the village green, which is the setting for four of Combe's seasonal festivals: a children's Maypole dance, a Summer Ball, a travelling funfair in the autumn and a firework display on Guy Fawkes Night. Combe has a Church of England primary school. Combe has a Women's Institute.

== Public transport ==
On weekdays, one train service a day calls at Combe railway station in each direction. There is an hourly bus service to Oxford and in the other direction Charlbury – which stops in Stonesfield Road.

== Sources and further reading ==
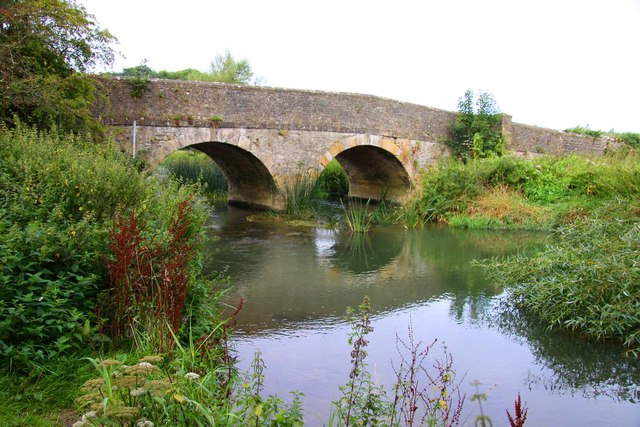
The 18th-century Combe Bridge across the River Evenlode

- Beeson, C.F.C. (1989) [1962]. Simcock, A.V. (ed.). Clockmaking in Oxfordshire 1400–1850 (3rd ed.). Oxford: Museum of the History of Science. pp. 35–36. ISBN 0-903364-06-9.
- Crossley, Alan; Elrington, C.R., eds. (1990). "Combe". A History of the County of Oxford. Victoria County History. Vol. 12: Wootton Hundred (South) including Woodstock. London: Oxford University Press for the Institute of Historical Research. pp. 75–98. ISBN 978-0-19722-774-9.
- Emden, C.E. (1970). Combe Church and Village.
- Sherwood, Jennifer; Pevsner, Nikolaus (1974). Oxfordshire. The Buildings of England. Harmondsworth: Penguin Books. pp. 551–553. ISBN 0-14-071045-0.
- Speake, George (2012). "An Early Romano-British Villa at Combe East End". Oxoniensia. LXXVII. Oxfordshire Architectural and Historical Society: 1–90. ISSN 0308-5562.
