= Church Hanborough =

Village in Oxfordshire, England

Coordinates: 51.800°N 1.383°W

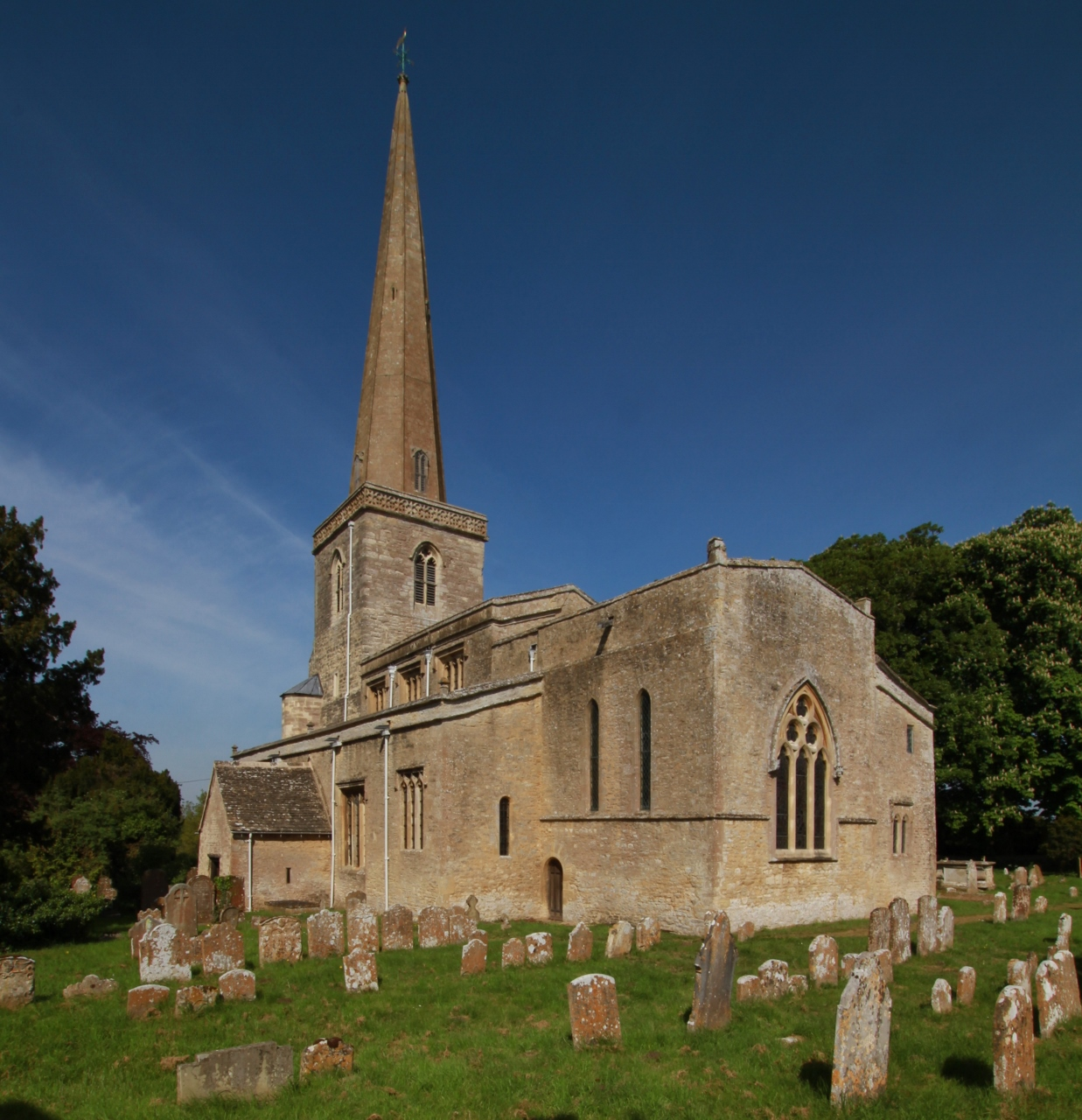
- SS Peter and Paul parish church

- Location within Oxfordshire
- OS grid reference: SP4212
- Civil parish: Hanborough
- District: West Oxfordshire
- Shire county: Oxfordshire
- Region: South East
- Country: England
- Sovereign state: United Kingdom
- Post town: Witney
- Postcode district: OX29
- Dialling code: 01993
- Police: Thames Valley
- Fire: Oxfordshire
- Ambulance: South Central
- UK Parliament: Witney
- Website: Hanborough Online

Church Hanborough is a village in Hanborough civil parish about 5 miles (8 km) northeast of Witney in Oxfordshire.

== Manor ==
The Domesday Book of 1086 records the village as Haneberge.

== Parish church ==
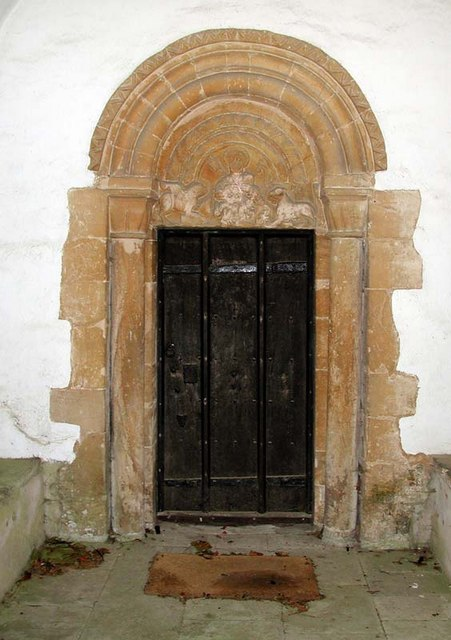
12th-century Norman north doorway of SS Peter and Paul parish church

The Church of England parish church of Saints Peter and Paul was built before 1130, when Henry I granted its advowson to Reading Abbey, which he had founded nine years earlier. Surviving 12th century features include Norman tympanum of the north door, which is a relief of Saint Peter with the Lamb of God and the lion of Saint Mark. Early in the 13th century the chancel and chancel arch were rebuilt, the north chapel was extended eastwards, the height of the aisles was increased, the north and south porches were added and a west tower was built.

In 1399 Pope Boniface IX granted an indulgence to contributors to the church fabric. Immediately after this the church was remodelled in Perpendicular Gothic style. The west tower was completely rebuilt and the spire and western buttresses added. Then the nave was remodelled with new north and south arcades of delicate octagonal columns. Later in the 15th century new windows were inserted in most parts of the church, and traceried wooden screens were inserted in the chancel arch and at the west ends of the north and south chapels. The arcades are similar to those of SS Peter and Paul parish church, Northleach, Gloucestershire, and it has been suggested that they are the work of the same master mason. Sources differ as to when the nave clerestory with its low-pitched roof was added. Jennifer Sherwood in The Buildings of England includes it in the early 15th-century remodelling, but the Victoria County History attributes it to the early 16th century.

The spire and other parts of the church were repaired in 1660–62 and much of the roof was repaired in 1778–79 and 1799–1800. At some date, perhaps in the 18th century, a singers' gallery was added. There is a record of it existing in about 1806, and it was removed in 1845–47. In 1860 the church was restored to designs by the architect Samuel Seckham. The 15th century east window of the chancel was removed and replaced by a Gothic Revival one in a 14th-century style. The set of three 15th-century wooden screens was to be removed, had not the then Bishop of Oxford, Samuel Wilberforce, personally intervened to save them. In 1892 the west door was opened and the 15th century font moved to its present position under the west tower, and the 15th century pulpit was repaired and lowered to its original level. The spire was repaired in 1972.

The tower has a ring of six bells. Joseph Carter of Reading, Berkshire cast the fourth bell in 1602, Richard I Purdue of Somerset cast the fifth bell in 1603 and Robert Atton of Buckingham cast the third bell in 1615. Robert II Wells of Aldbourne, Wiltshire cast the tenor bell in 1786 and James Wells, also of Aldbourne, cast the second bell in 1807. Mears and Stainbank of the Whitechapel Bell Foundry cast the treble bell in 1956. There is also a Sanctus bell that Richard Keene of Woodstock cast in 1668. The church has a 17th-century clock of unknown date. It has wheel trains end-to-end and a crown wheel and verge escapement in original condition. The church is a Grade I listed building. The parish is now part of the Benefice of Hanborough and Freeland.

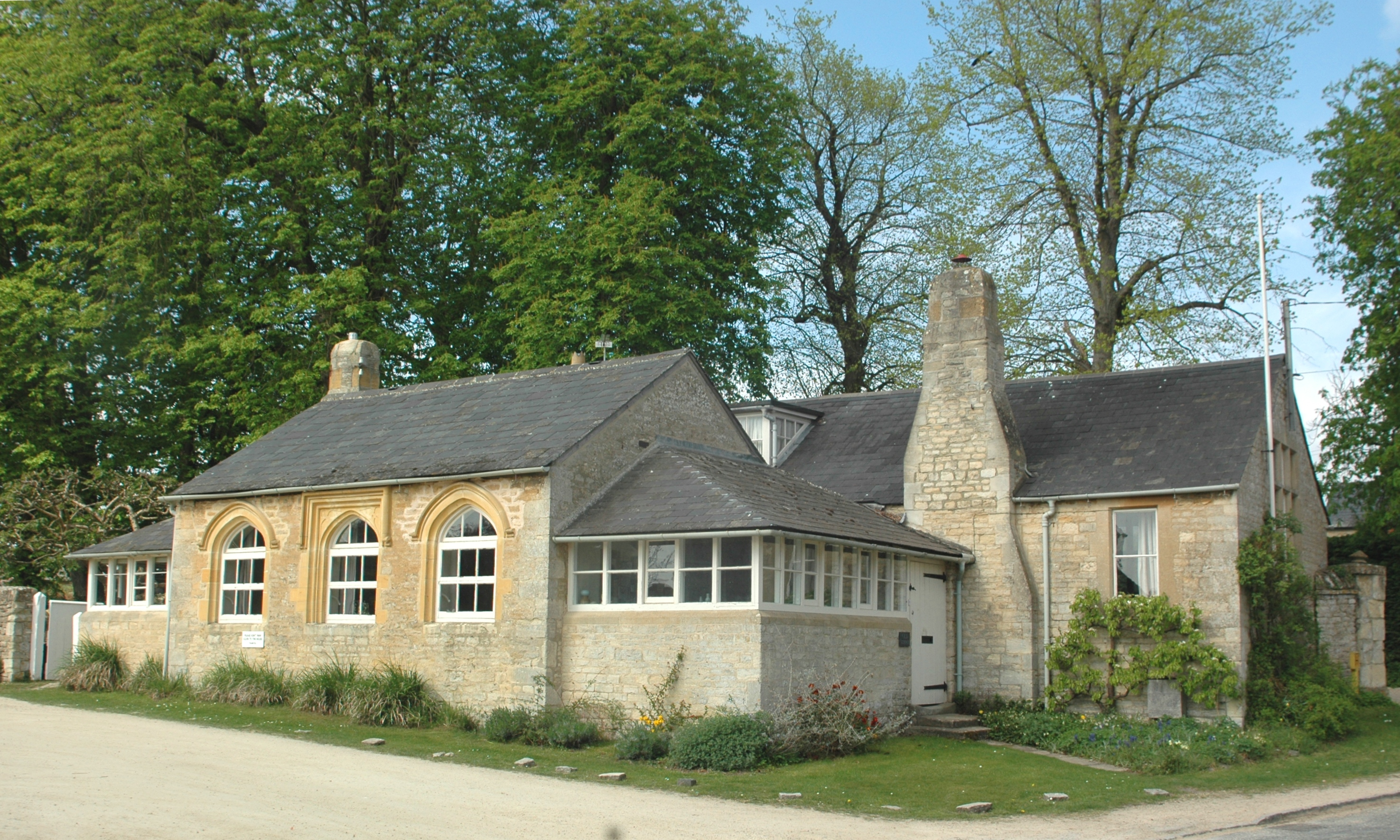
Former National School in Church Road

== Parish school ==
A national school near the church was built in 1832 and enlarged in 1872. It was closed in 1959, and converted into a private house in 1961.

== Public house ==
The Hand and Shears public house

Church Hanborough has one public house, the Hand and Shears, that was built in 1775. In the early 21st century it was controlled by Charles Wells Brewery. It was closed in the late 2010s, but reopened as a gastropub in 2020. The pub closed again in August 2023, and Wells & Young's Brewery advertised it for sale in October 2024. By December 2024, a residents' campaign had the pub protected as an asset of community value. By August 2025, a local farmer from Freeland had bought the pub, intending to reopen it.

== Notable residents ==
Among past residents of Church Hanborough are:

- Penelope Lively, author
- George Musser, author
- J. B. Priestley, author

== Sources and further reading ==
- Beeson, CFC (1989) [1962]. Simcock, AV (ed.). Clockmaking in Oxfordshire 1400–1850 (3rd ed.). Oxford: Museum of the History of Science. p. 39. ISBN 0-903364-06-9.
- Case, Humphrey; Bayne, Nicholas; Steele, Susan; Avery, Graham; Sutermeister, Helen (1964). "Excavations at City Farm, Hanborough, Oxon". Oxoniensia. XXIX–XXX. Oxford Architectural and Historical Society: 1–98.
- Crossley, Alan; Elrington, CR, eds. (1990). "Hanborough". A History of the County of Oxford. Victoria County History. Vol. 12: Wootton Hundred (South) including Woodstock. London: Oxford University Press for the Institute of Historical Research. pp. 156–179. ISBN 978-0-19722-774-9.
- Gray, Howard L (1959) [1915]. The English Field Systems. Cambridge, MA; London: Harvard University Press; Merlin Press. pp. 27–28, 40, 430–437.
- Sherwood, Jennifer; Pevsner, Nikolaus (1974). Oxfordshire. The Buildings of England. Harmondsworth: Penguin Books. pp. 543–544. ISBN 0-14-071045-0.
