= Hanborough railway station =

Railway station in England

Coordinates: 51°49′30.7″N 1°22′20.68″W

Hanborough
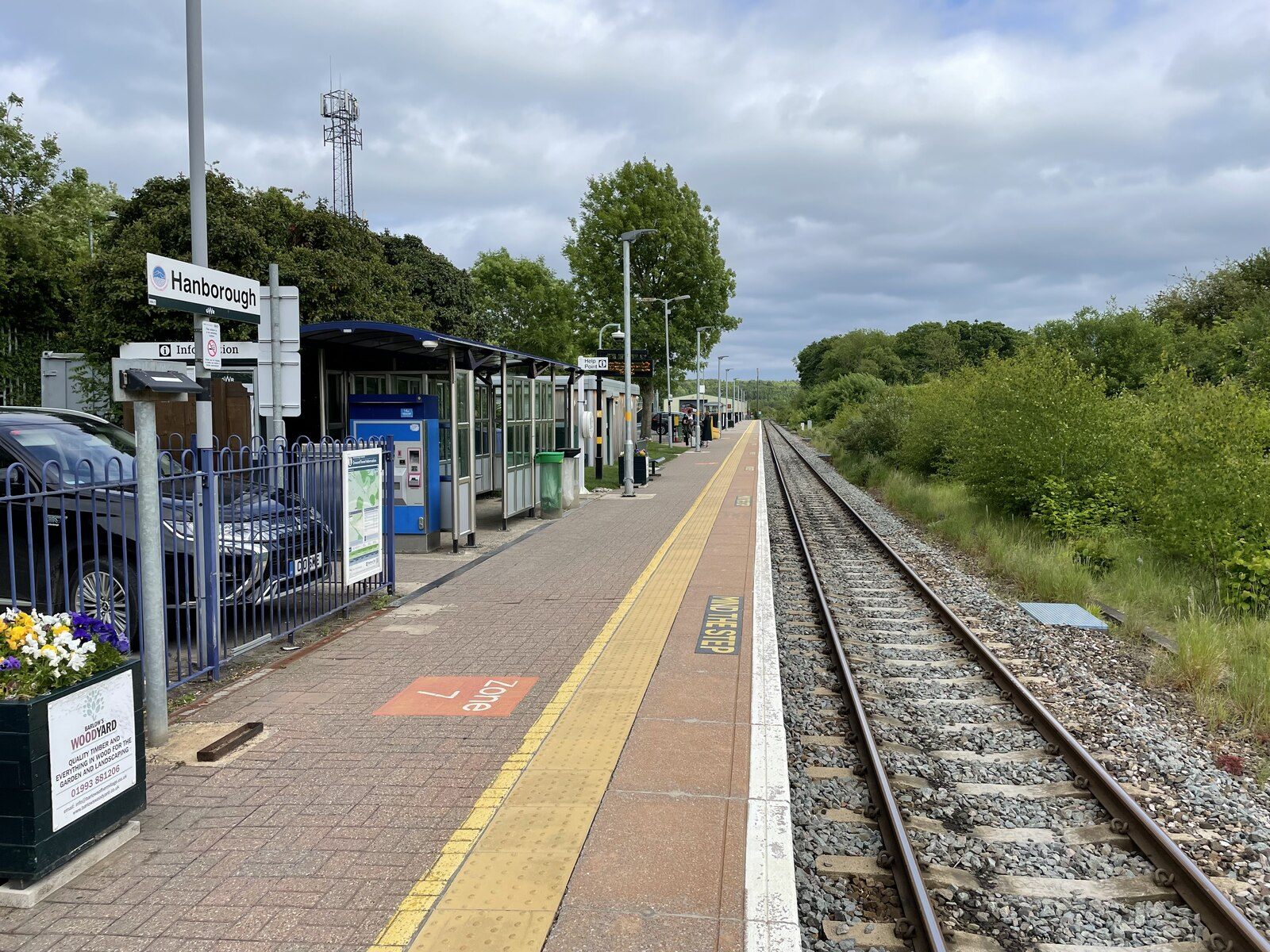
- The station seen in 2022

General information
- Location: Long Hanborough, West Oxfordshire; England
- Grid reference: SP433142
- Manager: Great Western Railway
- Platforms: 1

Other information
- Station code: HND
- Classification: DfT category F2

History
- Opened: 4 June 1853
- Original company: Oxford, Worcester and Wolverhampton Railway
- Pre-grouping: Great Western Railway
- Post-grouping: GWR

Key dates
- 1853: Opened

Passengers
- 2020/21: ▼47,254
- 2021/22: ▲178,368
- 2022/23: ▲262,498
- 2023/24: ▲286,402
- 2024/25: ▲376,462
Location
Notes
- Passenger statistics from

Hanborough railway station is a railway station in the village of Long Hanborough in Oxfordshire, England, serving the village and surrounding district. As a result of the Cotswold Line being singled the former up platform is the only one now in use for both up and down trains. It is served by Great Western Railway trains between London Paddington and Worcester Shrub Hill. It is also the nearest station to the towns of Woodstock and Witney.

There is a passenger-operated ticket machine (card payments only; not cash) at the entrance to the station platform.

The station has two car parks, which between them provide 241 car spaces. However, as of 2014, on most weekdays the number of passengers parking at Hanborough exceeds the number of spaces available.

Oxford Bus Museum is just east of the station, in the former goods yard.

== History ==
=== 19th century ===
The Oxford, Worcester and Wolverhampton Railway opened the station on 4 June 1853, and it was originally named Handborough. Between 1854 and 1861 it served as a junction for Oxford-bound passengers changing from through trains between Worcester and London Euston, for whom a refreshment room was provided.

=== 20th century ===
On 30 January 1965, by which time the station boards read "Handborough for Blenheim", it was the destination for the state funeral train of Sir Winston Churchill hauled by Battle of Britain class locomotive No. 34051 Winston Churchill. In his commentary on the funeral for BBC television, Richard Dimbleby said the report The Reshaping of British Railways had scheduled the station for closure.

In fact the station remained open, but in January 1966 it was de-staffed. Thereafter the standard OW&WR wooden station building and goods shed were demolished.

On 28 September 1992 the station was renamed Hanborough.

Toward the end of the 1990s the number of passengers slowly increased, until reaching an estimated total of almost 63 thousand in 1999–2000 (April–March respectively).

=== 21st century ===
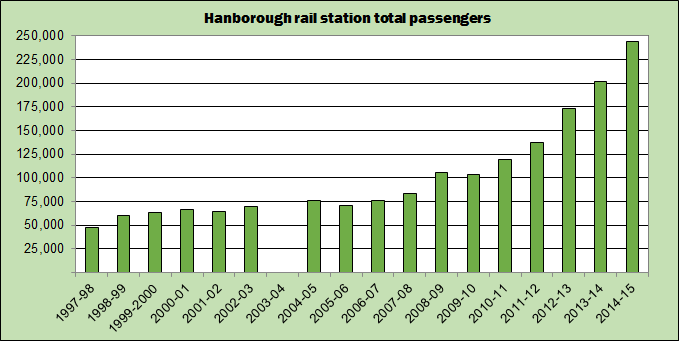
Bar chart of ORR annual passenger estimates from 1997–98 to 2014–15

Passenger numbers fluctuated until 2005–06, when the Office of the Rail Regulator estimated that the total number for that year was just above 70 thousand. The number of passengers increased rapidly to 2015-16 was more than 271 thousand, but fell back to 224 thousand following the opening of Oxford Parkway before recovering to 275 thousand in 2019–20.

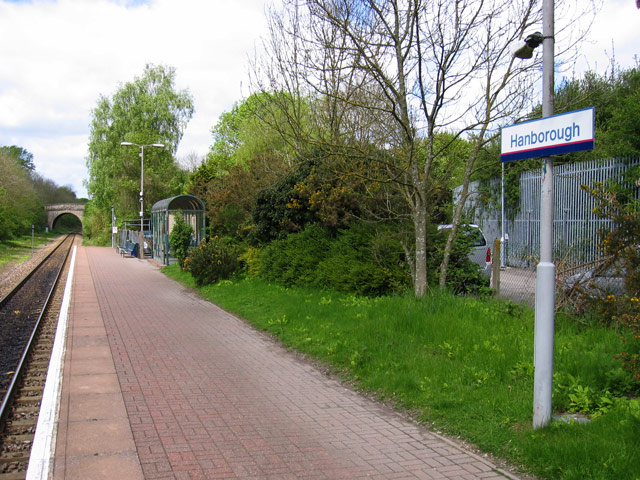
Hanborough railway station In 2005

More than 250 passengers a day come by car, but the original car park had only 50 spaces and by 2011 it had been overwhelmed. In August 2011 First Great Western and a housebuilding company jointly proposed a new development on a green field site next to the station that would provide new homes and a new 191-space car park. This was officially opened in July 2013, by which time it was already more than half-full each weekday. In November 2014 the Cotswold Line Promotion Group found 204 vehicles parked in the 191-space second car park and reported that it "was being used beyond capacity on most weekdays".

Plans were announced to increase services from Hanborough Station, by Great Western Railway. A launch event was held in Witney, at which GWR's managing director Mark Hopwood said that the investment needed was £275 million. Double tracking would be reinstated between North Oxford and Long Hanborough and two disused platforms reopened. The local constituency MP and Prime Minister David Cameron told delegates at the meeting " am utterly convinced of the necessity of investing in this line. I will do everything I can to give this vision a boost"

A new ticket office was officially opened in August 2019 as part of a £315,000 investment in the station.

== Services ==
Great Western Railway operate all services at Hanborough using Class 800 and 802 bi-mode trains.

The typical off-peak service in trains per hour is:

- 1 tph to London Paddington
- 1 tph to Worcester Foregate Street with some continuing to Great Malvern and Hereford

Preceding station	National Rail	Following station
Combe Limited Service	Great Western Railway Cotswold Line	Oxford
Charlbury	Great Western Railway Cotswold Line	Oxford
