= Combe railway station =

Railway station in Oxfordshire, England

Coordinates: 51.832°N 1.393°W

Combe
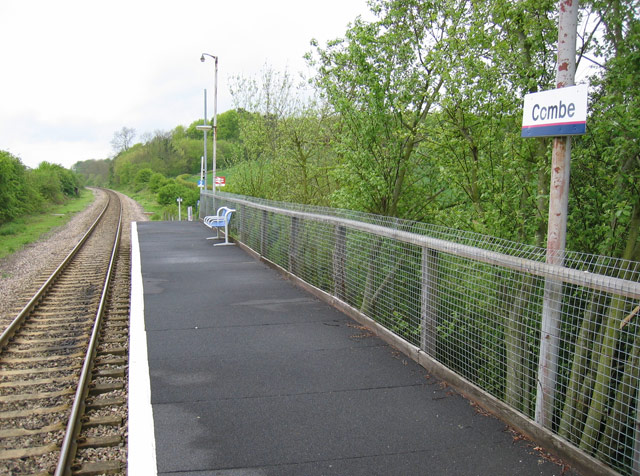
- Combe railway station in 2005

General information
- Location: Combe, West Oxfordshire; England
- Grid reference: SP418150
- Manager: Great Western Railway
- Platforms: 1

Other information
- Station code: CME
- Classification: DfT category F2

History
- Opened: 8 July 1935
- Original company: Great Western Railway
- Post-grouping: GWR

Key dates
- 1935: Opened

Passengers
- 2021/22: ▲1,238
- 2022/23: ▲1,398
- 2023/24: ▲1,554
- 2024/25: ▼1,326
- 2025/26: ▼1,246
Location
Notes
- Passenger statistics from the Office of Rail and Road

Combe railway station serves the village of Combe in Oxfordshire, England. It is on the Cotswold Line. This station and all trains serving it are run by Great Western Railway.

It was opened as Combe Halt by the Great Western Railway in 1935, originally having two platforms. In 2012, it was equipped with the modern Customer Information display screen now found on most Great Western Railway stations, plus an automatic train announcement system.

The station is about half a mile from the village of Combe (to the NW) and the hamlet of Combe East End (to the NE).

== Services ==
Since at least February 1999 the station has been served by a minimal service of two trains per day, one in each direction.

This service is currently formed of the 08:13 train to Didcot Parkway and the 17:37 train to Evesham which operate Monday-Friday only. There are currently no weekend services at the station with a normal service running on most Bank Holidays.

Preceding station	National Rail	Following station
Finstock	Great Western Railway Cotswold Line; Monday-Friday Only	Hanborough
