= AEC Regent =

AEC Regent may refer to any of the following double-decker buses :

- AEC Regent or AEC Regent I, 1929 model
- AEC Regent II
- AEC Regent III
- AEC Regent III RT
- AEC Regent V
