= Freeland, Oxfordshire =

Village in Oxfordshire, England

Coordinates: 51.814°N 1.404°W

Freeland
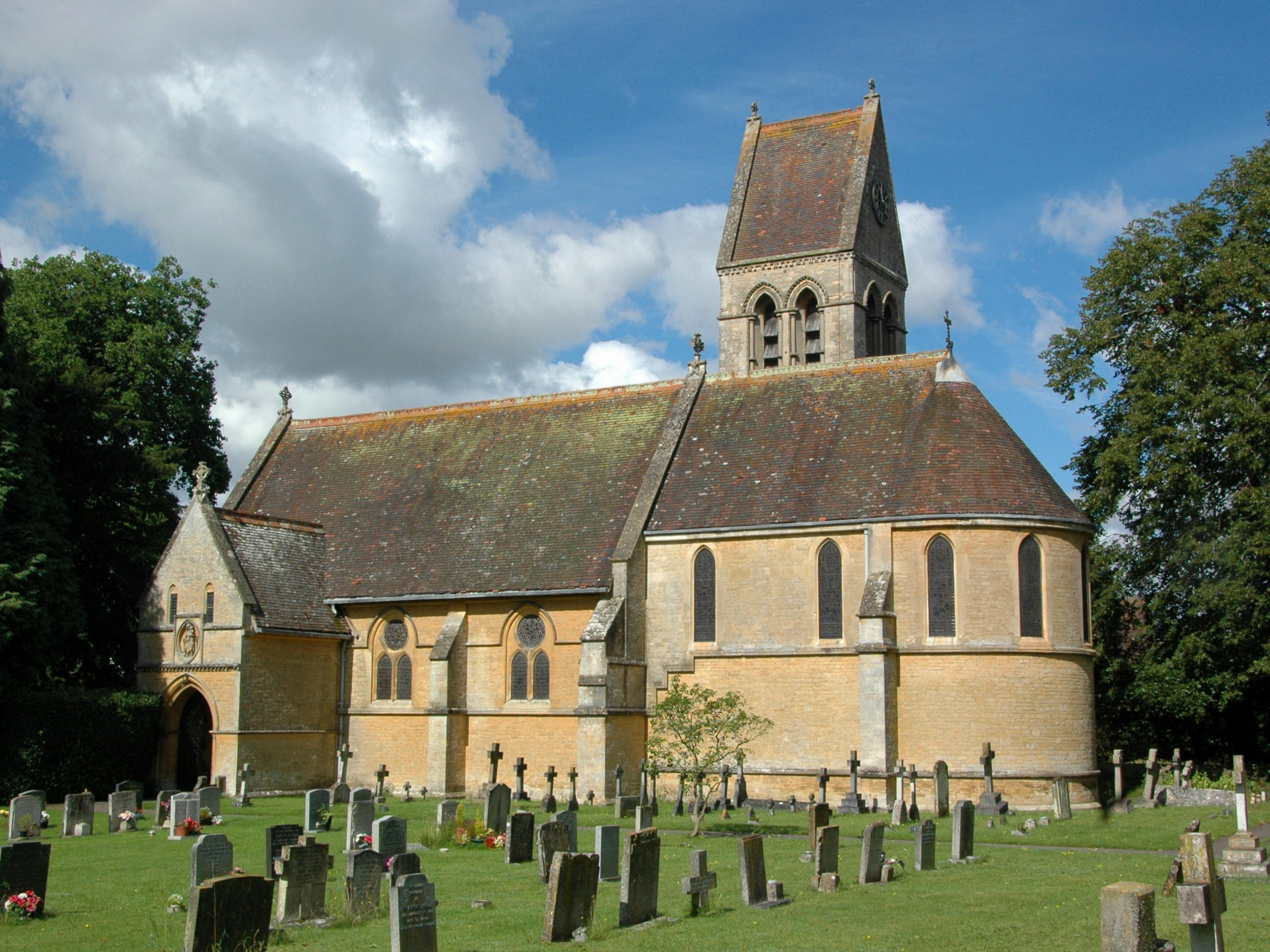
- St Mary the Virgin parish church

- Location within Oxfordshire
- Population: 1,490 (2021 Census)
- OS grid reference: SP4112
- Civil parish: Freeland
- District: West Oxfordshire
- Shire county: Oxfordshire
- Region: South East
- Country: England
- Sovereign state: United Kingdom
- Post town: Witney
- Postcode district: OX29
- Dialling code: 01993
- Police: Thames Valley
- Fire: Oxfordshire
- Ambulance: South Central
- UK Parliament: Bicester and Woodstock
- Website: Freeland Village Website

Freeland is a village and civil parish about 4 miles (6.4 km) northeast of Witney in Oxfordshire. The 2021 Census recorded the parish population as 1,490.

== History ==
Freeland village began as part of the parish of Eynsham. Its toponym is derived from the common Old English word fyrth, meaning a wood. In 1150 the Abbot of Eynsham granted land called terra de Frithe to one Nicholas of Leigh. "Frith Wood" later evolved into "Thrift Coppice" and by 1241 several people were living there. Freeland developed from a medieval freehold, probably on the site of Elm Farm. The freehold farm was called Frithlands by the 16th century and had been joined by at least two other cottages before 1650. There were something less than a dozen cottages at Freeland by 1762. The enclosure of the parish of Eynsham was resisted by rioting in the north of the parish around Barnard Gate and Freeland in 1780 but was eventually carried out in 1784.

The Roslyn house was established in 1738 and reputed to have been a 19th-century pugilists' meeting place called the "Wrostling House". Freeland had several public houses by the later part of the 18th century and one called the Royal Oak was recorded in 1836. The New Inn was built by William Merry in 1842, sold to Morrells in 1846 and for most of the 19th century was Freeland's only public house. Since 1974 it has been called the Oxfordshire Yeoman. It is now controlled by Greene King Brewery. It is the only public house in Freeland.

Freeland Lodge was built for the Taunton family in 1807. Most of the land on the west side of Wroslyn Road belonged to the family and was made into a park for the Lodge. The Lodge is now Freeland House Nursing Home. The Taunton family had sold the Lodge by 1875–76, when Marion Taunton had St Mary's House built as a home for retired governesses. In 1952 a Church of England convent of the Community of Saint Clare moved to the house and in 1960 a Gothic Revival chapel designed by the architect Henry Gordon was added.

Freeland grew as a ribbon development along the Via Regia between Eynsham and Charlbury. By 1847 its community included seven farmers, two shopkeepers, a mason, a carpenter and the publican of the New Inn. Freeland's population peaked at 232 in 1881 but fell to 160 in 1891, presumably as a result of the agricultural depression. In 1932, when it was transferred from the civil parish of Eynsham to that of Hanborough, Freeland's population was 214. Freeland was made a separate civil parish in 1951, by which time its population had risen to 530. It then rose every decade, reaching 1,374 in 1981 and 1,490 in 2021.

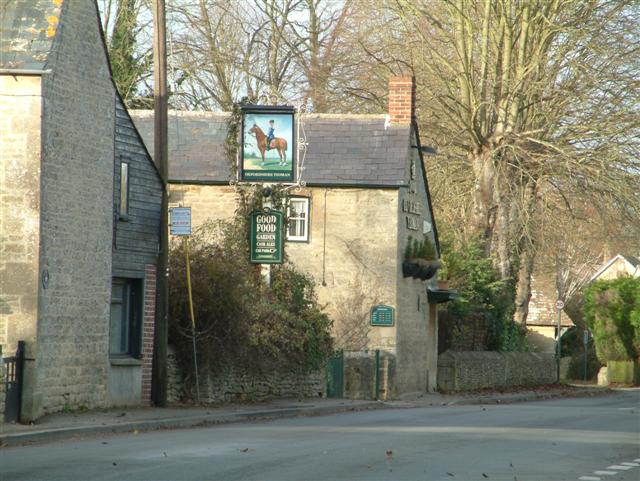
The Oxfordshire Yeoman, formerly the New Inn

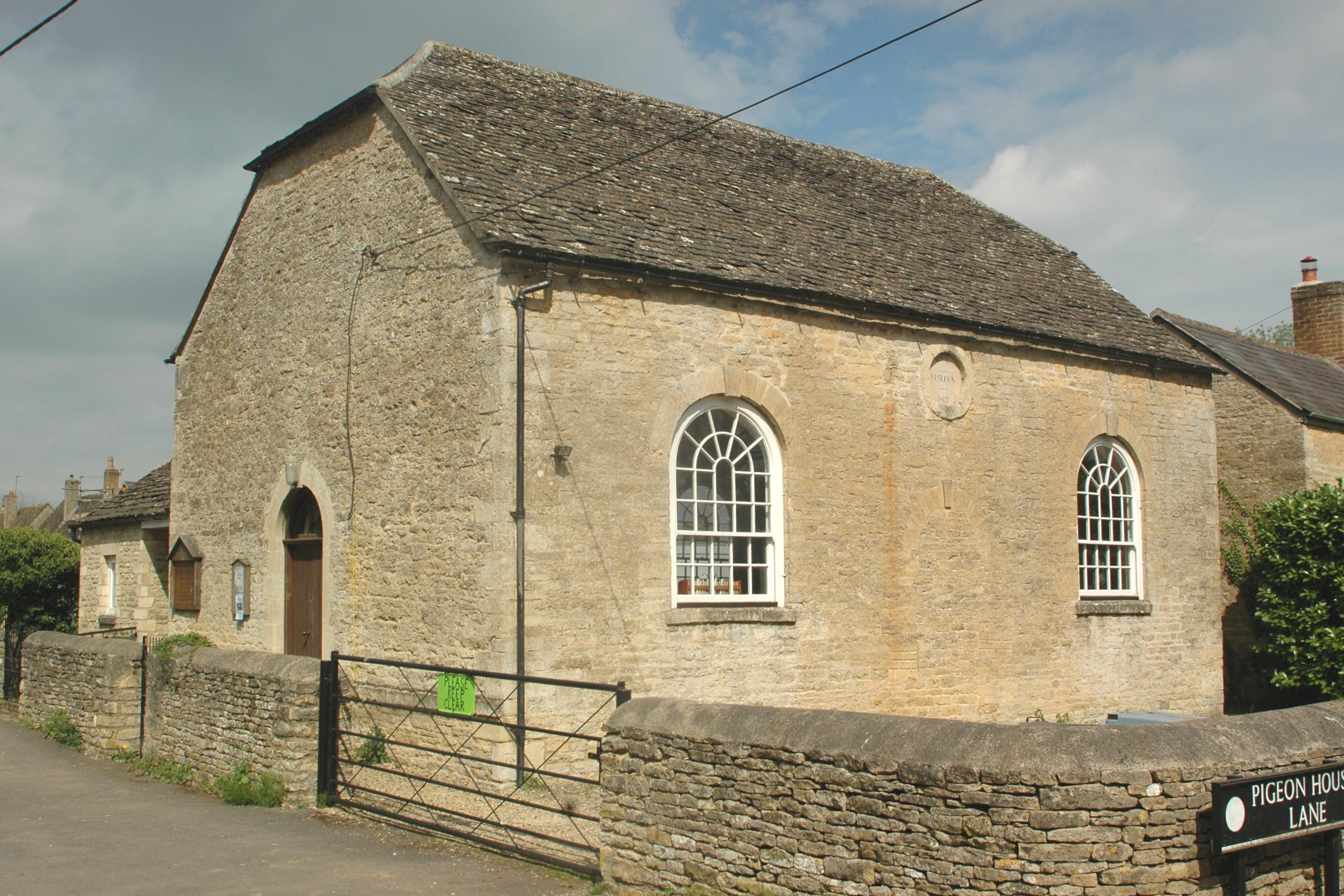
Methodist church (formerly Wesleyan chapel), built in 1807

== Chapel, Church and School ==
The Wesleyan chapel was completed in 1807. It is now Freeland Methodist Church. The Gothic Revival architect John Loughborough Pearson designed the Church of England parish church of Saint Mary the Virgin, parsonage and parish school. The Taunton family paid for the church and parsonage to be built in 1869 and the school in 1871. The church is high Victorian Gothic Revival, with stained glass and decoration by Clayton and Bell and 13th-century-style paintings of Jesus' Passion and Transfiguration.

Mears and Stainbank of the Whitechapel Bell Foundry cast four bells for St. Mary's in 1896. The same foundry cast a new treble and second bells in 2010, completing the present ring of six. The church clock was made and installed by Smiths of Derby in May 1898 and was dedicated to a Sarah Percival. In May 1969 the clock was taken down, reset and regilded by Judge Brothers of Oxford, and reinstalled by the local Breakspear family. The parish is now part of the Benefice of Hanborough and Freeland. The school, which was originally in an old stone house, next to the church on Wroslyn Road, moved to new premises in Parklands in 1964 and is now Freeland Church of England Primary School.

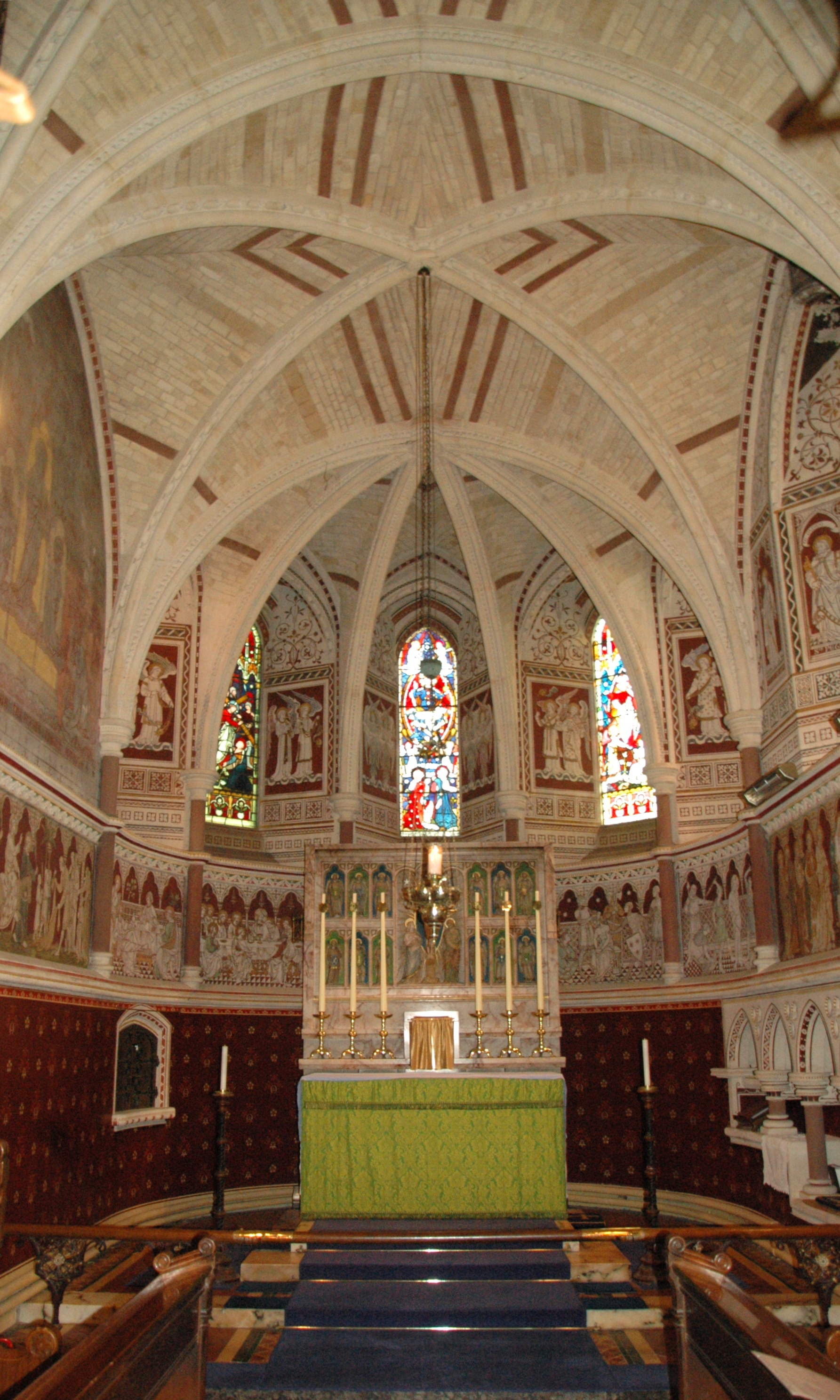
Inside the chancel of St Mary the Virgin parish church. One critic described John Loughborough Pearson as the only English architect of his era whose use of the apse was successful.

== Amenities ==
Freeland's first village hall was a former Army hut opened in about 1920. The games fields were opened in 1958 and a new village hall was completed in the 1960s. The second village hall was demolished in 2010, a new one was built in its place and in September 2011 it was officially opened by Prime Minister and Witney MP, David Cameron. It has a main hall with a kitchen and storage rooms. A second phase of the building project (the Community Recreation Facility – CRF), with sports changing rooms and meeting room (the "Newell Room"), was opened by the Deputy Lieutenant of Oxfordshire, David Mason, in September 2013. Freeland's one pub, The Oxfordshire Yeoman, is in Wroslyn Road opposite the village hall.

Freeland has a Football Club and a Cricket Club. Freeland Football club was founded in 1908. There is a gap in the history of the club, but recent activities are more recorded and are now documented at the club's website. The club's history is in the Witney and District League with at least one team in the league throughout the last 100 years. The club now has five teams. Freeland Firsts play in the W&DFA Premier Division and Freeland Reserves play in W&DFA Second Division. There are also Freeland A and B teams and a Sunday League team. Freeland Firsts were Premier Division champions in the 2005–06 and 2006–07 seasons. Freeland Reserves were Oxfordshire Senior League Division 3 champions in the 2008–09 season with the First team gaining promotion after finishing second in division 2. Freeland also has its own amateur orchestra.

== Sources and further reading ==
- Crossley, Alan; Elrington, C.R., eds. (1990). "Eynsham: Barnard Gate and Freeland". A History of the County of Oxford. Victoria County History. Vol. 12: Wootton Hundred (South) including Woodstock. London: Oxford University Press for the Institute of Historical Research. pp. 116–117. ISBN 978-0-19722-774-9.
- Emery, Frank (1974). The Oxfordshire Landscape. The Making of the English Landscape. London: Hodder & Stoughton. pp. 162–164. ISBN 0-340-04301-6.
- Rackham, Oliver (1976). Trees and Woodland in the British Landscape. Archaeology in the Field Series. London: J.M. Dent & Sons Ltd. p. 108. ISBN 0-460-04183-5.
- Sherwood, Jennifer; Pevsner, Nikolaus (1974). Oxfordshire. The Buildings of England. Harmondsworth: Penguin Books. pp. 606–607. ISBN 0-14-071045-0.
- Webster, Gwen (2009). Webster, Barrie (ed.). The Search for Freeland Gardens. Freeland: Warmporch Publishing.
