= West Oxfordshire District Council elections =

Local government elections in Oxfordshire, England

One third of West Oxfordshire District Council in Oxfordshire, England is elected each year, followed by one year without election. Since the last boundary changes in 2002, there are a total 49 councillors elected from 27 wards, each councillor serving a four-year term.

== Council elections ==
Summary of the council composition after recent council elections, click on the year for full details of each election. Boundary changes took place for the 2002 election leading to the whole council bring elected in that year.

Composition of the council
Year	Conservative	Labour	Liberal Democrats (Note: Includes totals for the predecessors of the Liberal Democrats, the Liberal Party and SDP (both of which participated in the Alliance).)	Reform	Green (Note: Includes totals for the predecessors of the Green Party of England and Wales, the Ecology Party and Green Party UK.)	Independents & Others	Council control after election
Local government reorganisation; council established (45 seats)
1973	1	8	1	–	–	35	Independent
1976	20	4	0	–	0	21	No overall control
New ward boundaries (49 seats)
1979	24	5	2	–	0	18	No overall control
1980	23	6	2	–	0	18	No overall control
1982	24	6	5	–	0	14	No overall control
1983	25	5	5	–	0	14	Conservative
1984	23	4	8	–	0	14	No overall control
1986	22	4	10	–	0	13	No overall control
1987	25	3	9	–	0	12	Conservative
1988	26	4	6	–	0	13	Conservative
1990	9	6	7	–	0	27	Independent
1991	11	6	7	–	0	25	Independent
1992	15	6	8	–	0	20	No overall control
1994	13	6	12	–	0	18	No overall control
1995	12	9	13	–	0	15	No overall control
1996	9	11	14	–	0	15	No overall control
1998	14	10	12	–	0	13	No overall control
1999	19	7	13	–	0	10	No overall control
2000	26	2	13	–	0	8	Conservative
New ward boundaries (49 seats)
2002	30	1	9	–	0	9	Conservative
2003	29	2	12	–	0	6	Conservative
2004	29	1	13	–	0	6	Conservative
2006	32	1	11	–	0	5	Conservative
2007	36	1	8	–	0	4	Conservative
2008	40	1	6	–	0	2	Conservative
2010	40	1	7	–	0	1	Conservative
2011	44	1	4	–	0	0	Conservative
2012	41	4	4	–	0	0	Conservative
New ward boundaries (49 seats)
2014	40	5	3	–	0	1	Conservative
2015	40	4	4	–	0	1	Conservative
2016	41	4	4	–	0	0	Conservative
2018	35	6	8	–	0		Conservative
2019	28	9	10	–	0	2	Conservative
2021	28	8	10	0	1	2	Conservative
2022	23	8	14	0	2	2	No overall control
2023	17	10	18	0	3	1	No overall control
2024	13	11	21	0	4	0	No overall control
2026	16	8	20	1	4	0	No overall control

== District result maps ==
2002 results map

2003 results map

2004 results map

2006 results map

2007 results map

2008 results map

2010 results map

2011 results map

2012 results map

2014 results map

2015 results map

2016 results map

2018 results map

2019 results map

2021 results map

2022 results map

2023 results map

2024 results map

2026 results map

== By-election results ==
By-elections occur when seats become vacant between council elections. Below is a summary of recent by-elections; full by-election results can be found by clicking on the by-election name.

By-election	Date	Incumbent party	Winning party
Milton-under-Wychwood	20 November 1997	Conservative	Conservative
Carterton South by-election	30 September 1999	Conservative	Conservative
Witney East by-election	7 July 2005	Conservative	Conservative
Witney Central by-election	25 January 2007	Conservative	Conservative
Carterton South by-election	2 May 2013	Conservative	Conservative
Witney East by-election	2 May 2013	Conservative	Conservative
Chipping Norton by-election	7 November 2013	Labour	Labour
Witney North by-election	20 August 2015	Independent	Conservative
Hailey, Minster Lovell and Leafield by-election	9 March 2017	Conservative	Liberal Democrats
The Bartons by-election	4 May 2017	Conservative	Conservative
Carterton South by-election	15 February 2018	Conservative	Conservative
Chipping Norton by-election	14 November 2024	Labour	Liberal Democrats
Standlake, Aston & Stanton Harcourt by-election	1 May 2025	Liberal Democrats	Liberal Democrats
