= 2002 West Oxfordshire District Council election =

2002 UK local government election

Map of the results of the 2002 West Oxfordshire District Council election. Conservatives in blue, Liberal Democrats in yellow, independents in light grey and Labour in red.

The 2002 West Oxfordshire District Council election took place on 2 May 2002 to elect members of West Oxfordshire District Council in Oxfordshire, England. The whole council was up for election with boundary changes since the last election in 2000. The Conservative Party stayed in overall control of the council.

== Background ==
Before the election, the Conservatives had a two-seat majority with 25 councillors, while the Liberal Democrats had 12 seats, Independents had nine, the Labour Party had two seats and one seat was vacant. Boundary changes took place for the 2002 election with the whole council being elected for the first time since 1976. Only seven wards had no boundary change and the number of councillors for Witney increased from 9 to 12.

A total of 108 candidates stood for the 49 seats on the council, 46 Conservatives, 27 Liberal Democrats, 18 Labour, 10 Independents, 6 Green Party and 1 United Kingdom Independence Party. 39 councillors sought re-election, with the Conservative group leader Barry Norton being re-elected in North Leigh without opposition.

== Election results ==
The Conservative majority on the council increased to 15, after 32 Conservative councillors were elected. 35 of the 39 councillors who sought election were re-elected, with the Liberal Democrats taking 10 seats, independents 5 seats and Labour kept the 2 seats they had been defending. The Green Party failed to win any seats, with 324 votes in fourth place in Witney North being their best result. Overall turnout at the election was 39%.

West Oxfordshire local election result 2002
Party	Seats	Gains	Losses	Net gain/loss	Seats %	Votes %	Votes	+/−
Conservative	32			+7	65.3	43.6	21,164	-3.3
Liberal Democrats	10			-2	20.4	27.5	13,341	+6.6
Independent	5			-4	10.2	12.1	5,882	+0.5
Labour	2			0	4.1	13.7	6,637	-6.4
Green	0			0	0.0	2.9	1,399	+2.5
UKIP	0			0	0.0	0.2	117	+0.2

== Ward results ==
Alvescot and Filkins
Party	Candidate	Votes	%	±%
Conservative	Angela Neale	421	71.0	
Liberal Democrats	Katherine Southey	172	29.0	
Majority		249	42.0	
Turnout		593	42.9	

Ascott and Shipton
Party	Candidate	Votes	%	±%
Conservative	Hilary Hibbert-Biles	439	57.4	
Independent	Robert Barrett	326	42.6	
Majority		113	14.8	
Turnout		765	47.1	

Bampton and Clanfield (2 seats)
Party	Candidate	Votes	%	±%
Independent	Jonathan Phillips	795	46.9	
Conservative	Frederick Gray	665	39.2	
Labour	Mark Albert	235	13.9	
Turnout		1,695	37.8	

Brize Norton and Shilton
Party	Candidate	Votes	%	±%
Conservative	Verena Hunt	unopposed		

Burford
Party	Candidate	Votes	%	±%
Independent	Keith Davies	407	56.5	
Conservative	Donald Seale	313	43.5	
Majority		94	13.0	
Turnout		720	47.3	

Carterton North East (2 seats)
Party	Candidate	Votes	%	±%
Conservative	Reginald Mason	unopposed		
Conservative	Keith Stone	unopposed		

Carterton North West (2 seats)
Party	Candidate	Votes	%	±%
Conservative	David King	555		
Conservative	Peter Handley	515		
Independent	Paul Wesson	448		
Turnout		1,518	28.5	

Carterton South (2 seats)
Party	Candidate	Votes	%	±%
Conservative	Windell Walcott	793		
Conservative	Harry Watts	448		
Liberal Democrats	Peter Madden	402		
Turnout		1,643	31.4	

Chadlington and Churchill
Party	Candidate	Votes	%	±%
Conservative	Terence Owen	402	65.5	
Liberal Democrats	Amanda Epps	212	34.5	
Majority		190	31.0	
Turnout		614	40.0	

Charlbury and Finstock (2 seats)
Party	Candidate	Votes	%	±%
Liberal Democrats	Glena Chadwick	902		
Liberal Democrats	Michael Breakell	708		
Independent	Robert Potter	405		
Conservative	Simon Hoare	321		
Conservative	Philip Rand	275		
Labour	Stephen Hague	214		
Turnout		2,825	50.8	

Chipping North (3 seats)
Party	Candidate	Votes	%	±%
Independent	John Hannis	1,000		
Conservative	Michael Howes	813		
Labour	Evelyn Coles	797		
Labour	Georgina Burrows	610		
Conservative	Carolyn Hazeel	608		
Labour	Stephen Akers	547		
Liberal Democrats	Catherine Dawson	209		
Liberal Democrats	Derek Brown	197		
Turnout		4,781	38.6	

Ducklington
Party	Candidate	Votes	%	±%
Conservative	Stephen Hayward	303	53.5	
Liberal Democrats	June Taylor	135	23.9	
Labour	Sheila Cuss	128	22.6	
Majority		168	29.6	
Turnout		566	35.8	

Eynsham and Cassington (3 seats)
Party	Candidate	Votes	%	±%
Liberal Democrats	Harry Wyatt	1,008		
Liberal Democrats	Margaret Stevens	967		
Liberal Democrats	David Rossiter	892		
Conservative	Frederick Wright	625		
Conservative	Frances Pike	546		
Conservative	Alison Fayers-Kerr	541		
Green	Jill Jones	201		
Turnout		4,780	37.7	

Freeland and Hanborough (2 seats)
Party	Candidate	Votes	%	±%
Liberal Democrats	Gareth Epps	866		
Liberal Democrats	David James	844		
Conservative	David Dawes	566		
Conservative	Helen Barrow	431		
Turnout		2,707	46.1	

Hailey, Minster Lovell and Leafield (2 seats)
Party	Candidate	Votes	%	±%
Conservative	George Kellow	780		
Conservative	Warwick Robinson	695		
Liberal Democrats	Christopher Blount	415		
Liberal Democrats	Malcolm West	282		
Turnout		2,172	39.1	

Kingham, Rollright and Enstone (2 seats)
Party	Candidate	Votes	%	±%
Conservative	Anthony Walker	768		
Conservative	Rodney Rose	712		
Liberal Democrats	Helen Worrall	411		
Labour	Melanie Deans	344		
Turnout		2,235	42.3	

Milton under Wychwood
Party	Candidate	Votes	%	±%
Conservative	Jeffrey Haine	524	76.4	
Liberal Democrats	John Lily	162	23.6	
Majority		362	52.8	
Turnout		686	42.8	

North Leigh
Party	Candidate	Votes	%	±%
Conservative	Barry Norton	unopposed		

Standlake, Aston and Stanton Harcourt (2 seats)
Party	Candidate	Votes	%	±%
Liberal Democrats	Brenda Smith	915		
Conservative	James Mills	606		
Independent	John Faulkner	548		
Turnout		2,069	43.1	

Stonesfield and Tackley (2 seats)
Party	Candidate	Votes	%	±%
Independent	Derrick Milard	903		
Independent	Charles Cottrell-Dormer	635		
Labour	David Cullen	471		
Conservative	Gillian Oldfield	284		
Liberal Democrats	John Miller	222		
Conservative	Sandra Rasch	204		
Turnout		2,719	47.4	

The Bartons
Party	Candidate	Votes	%	±%
Conservative	William Goffe	unopposed		

Witney Central (2 seats)
Party	Candidate	Votes	%	±%
Labour	Edward Cooper	587		
Conservative	Andrew Creery	429		
Conservative	Akin Adams	424		
Labour	Richard Kelsall	401		
Liberal Democrats	Brenda Churchill	277		
Green	Colette Jones	171		
Turnout		2,289	41.1	

Witney East (3 seats)
Party	Candidate	Votes	%	±%
Liberal Democrats	Stephen Holborough	521		
Conservative	Frank Smith	470		
Conservative	Andrew Rands	446		
Liberal Democrats	David Nicholson	443		
Liberal Democrats	Richard Willis	437		
Conservative	Grant Stanley	412		
Labour	Raymond Harris	243		
Green	Christopher Marchant	186		
Turnout		3,158	33.2	

Witney North (2 seats)
Party	Candidate	Votes	%	±%
Conservative	Martin Chapman	491		
Conservative	Roger Curry	484		
Liberal Democrats	Serena Martin	387		
Green	Richard Dossett-Davies	324		
Labour	Alison Bettle	234		
Turnout		1,920	33.4	

Witney South (3 seats)
Party	Candidate	Votes	%	±%
Conservative	Anthony Harvey	748		
Conservative	Peter Green	703		
Conservative	Ross McFarlane	598		
Independent	Thomas Titherington	415		
Labour	Michael Enright	412		
Labour	Andrew Ross	360		
Labour	David Wesson	360		
Liberal Democrats	Geoffrey Branner	226		
Green	Stephen Mohammad	132		
UKIP	James Robertshaw	117		
Turnout		4,071	32.6	

Witney West (2 seats)
Party	Candidate	Votes	%	±%
Conservative	Louise Chapman	469		
Conservative	Lesley Semaine	448		
Labour	Ross Beadle	231		
Labour	William Tumbridge	220		
Liberal Democrats	Anna Fairhurst	190		
Turnout		1,558	26.5	

Woodstock and Bladon (2 seats)
Party	Candidate	Votes	%	±%
Liberal Democrats	Julian Cooper	939		
Conservative	Ian Hudspeth	451		
Conservative	Joanne Chow	438		
Green	Paul Creighton	385		
Labour	Duncan Enright	243		
Turnout		2,456	47.9	
