= 2007 West Oxfordshire District Council election =

2007 UK local government election

Map of the results of the 2007 West Oxfordshire District Council election. Conservatives in blue, Liberal Democrats in yellow, Labour in red and Independent in light grey. Wards in dark grey were not contested in 2007.

The 2007 West Oxfordshire District Council election took place on 3 May 2007 to elect members of West Oxfordshire District Council in Oxfordshire, England. One third of the council was up for election and the Conservative Party stayed in overall control of the council.

After the election, the composition of the council was:

- Conservative 36
- Liberal Democrats 8
- Independent 4
- Labour 1

== Background ==
After the 2006 election the Conservatives controlled the council with 34 councillors, while the Liberal Democrats had nine, there were five Independents and Labour had one seat. 16 seats were to be contested in 2007, but on 21 April 2007 the chairman of West Oxfordshire District Council, Conservative Keith Stone, died. As a result, the election in his ward where he had been standing for re-election, Carterton North East, was postponed until 21 June.

For the 15 seats therefore contested on 3 May 2007, the Conservatives had 14 candidates, both the Liberal Democrats and Greens had 11, Labour had five, the UK Independence Party had two and there were two Independents. 11 sitting councillors sought re-election, with these including the only Labour councillor in West Oxfordshire, Eve Coles. There was no contest in Alvescot and Filkins ward, with Conservative David McFarlane being elected without opposition.

== Election result ==
The Conservatives made a net gain of two seats to win 10 of the 15 seats elected on 3 May. This took the Conservatives to 35 seats on the council and a majority of 22. The Conservatives gained three seats in Witney, in Witney Central, Witney East and Witney North wards, to win all five seats contested in the town and meant that only one councillor in Witney was not Conservative, independent Peter Green who had been elected as a Conservative. However the Conservatives lost a seat in Carterton South to the Liberal Democrats by a single vote.

Despite the gain in Carterton South the Liberal Democrats dropped to eight councillors, after losing two seats in Witney and received fewer votes than Labour in Witney. Labour retained their only seat on the council after Eve Cole held Chipping Norton by 163 votes. The number of independent councillors was reduced to four after the election, while overall eight of the 11 councillors who stood again held their seats. Overall turnout at the election was 38.22%, reaching a high of 51.12% in Charlbury ward.

The Conservatives won a further seat in the delayed election in Carterton North East on 21 June, which was held for the party by Norman Macrae with a majority of 296 votes over independent Paul Wesson.

West Oxfordshire local election result 2007
Party	Seats	Gains	Losses	Net gain/loss	Seats %	Votes %	Votes	+/−
Conservative	11	3	1	+2	68.8	52.4	10,151	-7.2%
Liberal Democrats	3	1	2	-1	18.8	19.3	3,745	-0.7%
Labour	1	0	0	0	6.3	9.6	1,855	+0.3%
Independent	1	0	1	-1	6.3	6.7	1,300	+0.1%
Green	0	0	0	0	0	10.6	2,059	+6.1%
UKIP	0	0	0	0	0	1.3	260	+1.3%

The above totals include the delayed election in Carterton North East.

== Ward results ==
Alvescot and Filkins
Party	Candidate	Votes	%	±%
Conservative	David McFarlane	unopposed		
Conservative hold		Swing		

Bampton and Clanfield
Party	Candidate	Votes	%	±%
Conservative	Mark Booty	1,007	78.4	+40.9
Liberal Democrats	Gill Workman	155	12.1	+12.1
Green	Gill Edmonds	123	9.6	+9.6
Majority		852	66.3	
Turnout		1,285	45.2	−6.7
Conservative hold		Swing		

Carterton North West
Party	Candidate	Votes	%	±%
Conservative	Pete Handley	784	74.8	−9.0
Liberal Democrats	John Lilly	264	25.2	+25.2
Majority		520	49.6	−18.1
Turnout		1,048	33.0	+1.8
Conservative hold		Swing		

Carterton South
Party	Candidate	Votes	%	±%
Liberal Democrats	Peter Madden	493	50.1	+31.3
Conservative	Harry Watts	492	49.9	−31.3
Majority		1	0.2	
Turnout		985	33.5	−11.4
Liberal Democrats gain from Conservative		Swing		

Charlbury and Finstock
Party	Candidate	Votes	%	±%
Liberal Democrats	Mike Breakell	790	52.8	−13.9
Conservative	Gill Hill	579	38.7	+5.4
Green	Harriet Marshall	128	8.6	+8.6
Majority		211	14.1	−19.4
Turnout		1,497	51.2	+0.3
Liberal Democrats hold		Swing		

Chipping Norton
Party	Candidate	Votes	%	±%
Labour	Eve Coles	958	47.3	+20.1
Conservative	Michael Tysoe	795	39.3	−21.7
Independent	Keith Greenwell	272	13.4	+13.4
Majority		163	8.0	
Turnout		2,025	42.9	+0.1
Labour hold		Swing		

Eynsham and Cassington
Party	Candidate	Votes	%	±%
Liberal Democrats	Richard Andrews	910	49.1	+8.9
Conservative	Jane Doughty	685	37.0	−8.6
UKIP	Jonathan Miller	134	7.2	+7.2
Green	Xanthe Bevis	124	6.7	−1.7
Majority		225	12.1	
Turnout		1,853	42.1	−0.1
Liberal Democrats hold		Swing		

Hailey, Minster Lovell and Leafield
Party	Candidate	Votes	%	±%
Conservative	Warwick Robinson	809	67.8	−0.5
Liberal Democrats	Elizabeth Mortimer	230	19.3	−2.9
Green	Andrew Coles	155	13.0	+13.0
Majority		579	48.5	+2.4
Turnout		1,194	38.6	−6.3
Conservative hold		Swing		

Kingham, Rollright and Enstone
Party	Candidate	Votes	%	±%
Conservative	Andrew Beaney	885	68.7	+6.6
Labour	Melanie Deans	151	11.7	−6.4
Green	Brian Luney	132	10.2	+10.2
Liberal Democrats	Christopher Tatton	121	9.4	−10.4
Majority		734	56.9	+14.5
Turnout		1,289	41.3	−4.7
Conservative hold		Swing		

Stonesfield and Tackley
Party	Candidate	Votes	%	±%
Independent	Charles Cottrell-Dormer	895	71.0	+1.7
Green	Susan Turnbull	365	29.0	+14.6
Majority		530	42.1	−10.9
Turnout		1,260	40.0	−8.8
Independent hold		Swing		

Witney Central
Party	Candidate	Votes	%	±%
Conservative	Nick Buckle	569	53.4	+10.5
Labour	Phillip Edney	201	18.9	−8.8
Liberal Democrats	Brenda Churchill	172	16.1	−1.7
Green	Sandra Simpson	124	11.6	0.0
Majority		368	34.5	+19.4
Turnout		1,066	33.3	−7.8
Conservative gain from Independent		Swing		

Witney East
Party	Candidate	Votes	%	±%
Conservative	Alan Davies	959	57.7	−3.2
Labour	Duncan Enright	280	16.8	+9.0
Liberal Democrats	David Nicholson	242	14.6	−2.9
Green	Enid Dossett-Davies	182	10.9	−2.9
Majority		679	40.8	−2.7
Turnout		1,663	33.1	−1.1
Conservative gain from Liberal Democrats		Swing		

Witney North
Party	Candidate	Votes	%	±%
Conservative	Richard Langridge	588	51.4	+6.2
Green	Richard Dossett-Davies	368	32.1	+6.4
Liberal Democrats	Serena Martin	189	16.5	−2.5
Majority		220	19.2	−0.2
Turnout		1,145	37.0	−4.1
Conservative gain from Liberal Democrats		Swing		

Witney South
Party	Candidate	Votes	%	±%
Conservative	Alvin Adams	849	55.2	−5.7
Labour	David Wesson	215	14.0	−1.9
Liberal Democrats	June Taylor	179	11.6	−1.7
Green	Jill Jones	169	11.0	+1.1
UKIP	David Phipps	126	8.2	+8.2
Majority		634	41.2	−3.9
Turnout		1,538	34.7	+0.5
Conservative hold		Swing		

Witney West
Party	Candidate	Votes	%	±%
Conservative	Harry Eaglestone	723	79.3	+28.0
Green	Stephen Mohammad	189	20.7	+11.6
Majority		534	58.6	+34.1
Turnout		912	30.8	−6.2
Conservative hold		Swing		

=== Carterton North East delayed election ===
Carterton North East
Party	Candidate	Votes	%	±%
Conservative	Norman Macrae	427	70.0	+7.9
Independent	Paul Wesson	133	21.8	−16.1
Labour	David Wesson	50	8.2	+8.2
Majority		294	48.2	+24.1
Turnout		610	17.8	−7.5
Conservative hold		Swing		
