= John Gittings =

British journalist and author

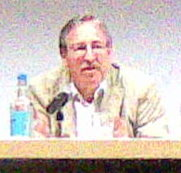

John Gittings is a British journalist and author who is mainly known for his works on modern China and the Cold War. From 1983 to 2003, he worked at The Guardian (UK) as assistant foreign editor and chief foreign leader-writer. He has also been a fellow of the Transnational Institute.

== Biography ==
He was educated at Midhurst Grammar School (1950–56), the School of Oriental and African Studies (1957–58), and Corpus Christi College, Oxford (1958–61). He taught at the Polytechnic of Central London (now the University of Westminster), before going to The Guardian, where he was employed for 20 years (1983–2003), as assistant foreign editor and chief foreign leader-writer.

He has also worked in the past at the Royal Institute of International Affairs, the University of Chile, and the Far Eastern Economic Review.

Since the mid-2000s, Gittings has been involved in local politics, standing unsuccessfully for the Labour Party in elections to West Oxfordshire District Council in the Ascott and Shipton ward in 2006, 2010 and 2014.

== Publications ==
=== Books ===
- The Glorious Art of Peace: From the Iliad to Iraq. Oxford: OUP, 2012.
- The Changing Face of China: From Mao to Market. Oxford University Press. 2005 (paperback: 2006).
- China through the Sliding Door. London: Simon & Schuster/Touchstone, 1999.
- Real China: From Cannibalism to Karaoke. London: Simon & Schuster, 1996.
- China Changes Face: The Road from Revolution. Oxford: OUP, 1989/90.
- The World and China, 1922–1974. London: Eyre-Methuen, 1974.
- A Chinese View of China. London: BBC, 1972.
- Survey of the Sino-Soviet Dispute. Oxford: OUP for RIIA, 1968.
- The Role of the Chinese Army. Oxford: OUP for RIIA, 1966.

=== Online ===
- Profile on the website of the guardian.co.uk
- Articles on the website of the Transnational Institute
