= 2015 West Oxfordshire District Council election =

2015 UK local government election

Map of the results of the 2015 West Oxfordshire District Council election. Conservatives in blue and Liberal Democrats in yellow. Wards in dark grey were not contested in 2015.

The 2015 West Oxfordshire District Council election took place on 22 May 2015 to elect members of West Oxfordshire District Council in Oxfordshire, England. One third of the council was up for election and the Conservative Party stayed in overall control of the council.

After the election, the composition of the council was:

- Conservative 40
- Labour 4
- Liberal Democrats 4
- Independent 1

== Background ==
After the last election in 2014 the Conservatives controlled the council with 40 councillors, while Labour had five seats, the Liberal Democrats had three seats and there was one Independent. 17 seats were contested in 2015, with 2 seats being elected in Hailey, Minster Lovell and Leafield ward after the resignation of a councillor.

Four councillors stood down at the election, Mark Booty, Eve Coles, Hywel Davies and Simon Hoare, while 13 councillors sought re-election. The Conservative, Labour and Liberal Democrat parties each had a full 17 candidates, the Greens had 16 candidates and the UK Independence Party had 14 candidates.

== Election result ==
The Conservatives remained in control of the council with 40 councillors after winning 16 of the 17 seats contested. They gained a seat in Chipping Norton from Labour, but in Charlbury and Finstock Liberal Democrat Andy Graham took the seat from the Conservatives. This left both Labour and the Liberal Democrats with four seats, while there remained one independent councillor. All 13 councillors who stood again were re-elected and overall turnout at the election was 71.58%.

West Oxfordshire local election result 2015
Party	Seats	Gains	Losses	Net gain/loss	Seats %	Votes %	Votes	+/−
Conservative	16	1	1	0	94.1	53.6	23,231	+4.3%
Liberal Democrats	1	1	0	+1	5.9	10.4	4,512	-0.1%
Labour	0	0	1	-1	0	17.5	7,579	-1.1%
UKIP	0	0	0	0	0	9.5	4,126	-3.2%
Green	0	0	0	0	0	9.0	3,906	+3.1%

== Ward results ==
Alvescot and Filkins
Party	Candidate	Votes	%	±%
Conservative	Ross McFarlane	709	66.4	−7.5
UKIP	Ken Clark	102	9.6	+9.6
Labour	Richard Kelsall	100	9.4	+9.4
Green	Alma Tumilowicz	87	8.2	−17.9
Liberal Democrats	Gilly Workman	69	6.5	+6.5
Majority		607	56.9	+9.2
Turnout		1,067	74.3	+21.4
Conservative hold		Swing		

Bampton and Clanfield
Party	Candidate	Votes	%	±%
Conservative	Ted Fenton	1,319	59.4	−21.9
UKIP	Susan Cummins	284	12.8	+12.8
Labour	Patrick Brennan	216	9.7	−9.0
Green	Maurice Fantato	214	9.6	+9.6
Liberal Democrats	Glena Chadwick	186	8.4	+8.4
Majority		1,035	46.6	−15.9
Turnout		2,219	75.2	+33.2
Conservative hold		Swing		

Carterton North East
Party	Candidate	Votes	%	±%
Conservative	Norman MacRae	1,528	59.7	+10.5
UKIP	Leandra Edmands	386	15.1	−12.2
Labour	Dave Wesson	361	14.1	+0.6
Liberal Democrats	Mike Baggaley	153	6.0	+6.0
Green	Paul Creighton	130	5.1	−4.9
Majority		1,142	44.6	+22.8
Turnout		2,558	64.3	+39.9
Conservative hold		Swing		

Carterton North West
Party	Candidate	Votes	%	±%
Conservative	Pete Handley	1,328	60.0	−3.1
UKIP	Barclay Lawrence	371	16.7	+16.7
Labour	Melvin Long	270	12.2	−8.1
Green	Andy King	129	5.8	−10.8
Liberal Democrats	Mark Mann	117	5.3	+5.3
Majority		957	43.2	+0.4
Turnout		2,215	67.7	+36.1
Conservative hold		Swing		

Carterton South
Party	Candidate	Votes	%	±%
Conservative	Michael Brennan	1,363	61.5	+7.0
UKIP	Martyn Webb	342	15.4	−14.6
Labour	Moira Swann	254	11.5	+2.3
Liberal Democrats	Peter Madden	133	6.0	+6.0
Green	Tony Barrett	124	5.6	−1.7
Majority		1,021	46.1	+20.6
Turnout		2,216	67.4	+34.9
Conservative hold		Swing		

Charlbury and Finstock
Party	Candidate	Votes	%	±%
Liberal Democrats	Andy Graham	1,108	43.2	−23.6
Conservative	Rory MacArthur	790	33.5	+0.3
Green	Celia Kerslake	255	10.8	+10.8
Labour	Georgia Mazower	171	7.3	+7.3
UKIP	Stephen Nash	123	5.2	+5.2
Majority		228	9.7	−23.8
Turnout		2,357	77.5	+28.2
Liberal Democrats gain from Conservative		Swing		

Chipping Norton
Party	Candidate	Votes	%	±%
Conservative	Guy Wall	1,782	51.9	+11.1
Labour	Sian O'Neill	887	25.8	−19.4
UKIP	Jim Stanley	309	9.0	−5.0
Green	Charles Averill	273	8.0	+8.0
Liberal Democrats	Ivan Melet	181	5.3	+5.3
Majority		895	26.1	
Turnout		3,432	73.3	+29.1
Conservative gain from Labour		Swing		

Eynsham and Cassington
Party	Candidate	Votes	%	±%
Conservative	Peter Kelland	1,513	41.6	+1.9
Liberal Democrats	Matthew Gordon-Banks	680	18.7	−5.1
Labour	Judith Wardle	557	15.3	−3.5
Green	Karl Gay	494	13.6	+13.6
UKIP	Jonathan Miller	394	10.8	−7.0
Majority		833	22.9	+7.0
Turnout		3,638	74.7	+32.0
Conservative hold		Swing		

Hailey, Minster Lovell and Leafield (2 seats)
Party	Candidate	Votes	%	±%
Conservative	Gill Hill	1,374		
Conservative	Warwick Robinson	1,220		
Labour	Liz Blount	391		
Liberal Democrats	Andy Crick	346		
Labour	Mary Jay	343		
Green	Andrew Wright	341		
Liberal Democrats	Elizabeth Mortimer	257		
Turnout		4,272	76.0	+42.0
Conservative hold		Swing		
Conservative hold		Swing		

Kingham, Rollright and Enstone
Party	Candidate	Votes	%	±%
Conservative	Andrew Beaney	1,433	60.7	−10.8
Labour	Andrew Scott	337	14.3	−14.2
UKIP	Alistair Scott	204	8.6	+8.6
Liberal Democrats	Jenny Tatton	197	8.3	+8.3
Green	Nicholas Goodwin	191	8.1	+8.1
Majority		1,096	46.4	+3.3
Turnout		2,362	72.3	+37.5
Conservative hold		Swing		

Stonesfield and Tackley
Party	Candidate	Votes	%	±%
Conservative	Charles Cottrell-Dormer	1,448	57.7	+1.6
Labour	Dave Baldwin	430	17.1	−7.7
Green	Harriet Kopinska	334	13.3	+13.3
Liberal Democrats	Christopher Tatton	296	11.8	−7.3
Majority		1,018	40.6	+9.3
Turnout		2,508	78.7	+36.3
Conservative hold		Swing		

Witney Central
Party	Candidate	Votes	%	±%
Conservative	Peter Dorward	1,180	46.0	−1.4
Labour	Kate Walsh	813	31.7	−20.9
UKIP	Clive Taylor	225	8.8	+8.8
Green	Jenny Guildford	199	7.8	+7.8
Liberal Democrats	Christopher Blount	149	5.8	+5.8
Majority		367	14.3	
Turnout		2,566	66.7	+35.4
Conservative hold		Swing		

Witney East
Party	Candidate	Votes	%	±%
Conservative	Jeanette Baker	2,274	53.9	+11.5
Labour	Duncan Hume	1,017	24.1	−4.6
Green	Kate Griffin	419	9.9	−0.2
UKIP	James Mawle	327	7.8	−4.7
Liberal Democrats	Ross Beadle	182	4.3	−1.0
Majority		1,257	29.8	+16.0
Turnout		4,219	72.9	+37.2
Conservative hold		Swing		

Witney North
Party	Candidate	Votes	%	±%
Conservative	Richard Langridge	1,120	49.6	+6.1
Labour	Trevor License	419	18.6	+1.3
Green	Brigitte Hickman	323	14.3	−13.3
UKIP	Stephen Westwood	259	11.5	+11.5
Liberal Democrats	William Griffiths	136	6.0	−5.6
Majority		701	31.1	+15.3
Turnout		2,257	70.1	+37.6
Conservative hold		Swing		

Witney South
Party	Candidate	Votes	%	±%
Conservative	Alvin Adams	1,497	47.2	+9.8
Labour	Stephen Parkinson	697	22.0	+1.8
UKIP	James Robertshaw	559	17.6	−10.7
Green	Alex Friend	248	7.8	−1.8
Liberal Democrats	Emma Tatton	171	5.4	+0.9
Majority		800	25.2	+16.1
Turnout		3,172	67.4	+32.1
Conservative hold		Swing		

Witney West
Party	Candidate	Votes	%	±%
Conservative	Harry Eaglestone	1,353	61.3	+0.3
Labour	Calvert McGibbon	316	14.3	−10.3
UKIP	Max Everett	241	10.9	+10.9
Liberal Democrats	Diane West	151	6.8	+6.8
Green	Rosanna Pearson	145	6.6	−7.8
Majority		1,037	47.0	+10.6
Turnout		2,206	70.5	+44.3
Conservative hold		Swing		

== By-elections between 2015 and 2016 ==
A by-election was held in Witney North on 20 August 2015 after independent councillor David Snow resigned from the council in June 2015. David Snow had been originally elected as a Conservative but resigned from the party in May 2013. The seat was gained for the Conservatives by Carol Reynolds with a majority of 63 votes over Liberal Democrat Diane West.

Witney North by-election 20 August 2015
Party	Candidate	Votes	%	±%
Conservative	Carol Reynolds	264	33.9	−15.7
Liberal Democrats	Diane West	201	25.8	+19.8
Green	Brigitte Hickman	136	17.5	+3.2
Labour	Trevor License	114	14.6	−4.0
UKIP	James Robertshaw	64	8.2	−3.3
Majority		63	8.1	−23.0
Turnout		779	24.1	−46.0
Conservative gain from Independent		Swing		
