= 2014 West Oxfordshire District Council election =

2014 UK local government election

Map of the results of the 2014 West Oxfordshire District Council election. Conservatives in blue, Labour in red and Liberal Democrats in yellow. Wards in dark grey were not contested in 2014.

The 2014 West Oxfordshire District Council election took place on 22 May 2014 to elect members of West Oxfordshire District Council in Oxfordshire, England. One third of the council was up for election and the Conservative Party stayed in overall control of the council.

After the election, the composition of the council was:

- Conservative 40
- Labour 5
- Liberal Democrats 3
- Independent 1

== Background ==
After the previous election in 2012 the Conservatives controlled the council with 41 councillors, while both Labour and the Liberal Democrats had four seats. However, in May 2013 two Conservative councillors, Steve Hayward of Ducklington ward and David Snow of Witney North, resigned from the party to become Independents. They were joined the following month by Annie Roy-Barker of Chipping Norton ward who also left the Conservatives to become an independent. With seats in Ducklington, and Stonesfield and Tackley, vacant the council composition before the 2014 election was therefore 37 Conservatives, four Labour, four Liberal Democrats and two independents.

16 seats were scheduled to be contested in 2014, but the vacancy in Stonesfield and Tackley meant 17 seats were elected. A total of 66 candidates stood for election, 17 Conservatives, 15 Labour, 11 Green, 11 UK Independence Party, nine Liberal Democrats and three independents. 10 sitting councillors sought re-election, with councillors Annie Roy-Barker, Arthur Goffe, Hilary Hibbert-Biles, Verena Hunt and Larry Poole standing down at the election.

The election was held on 22 May 2014 at the same time as the 2014 European Parliament elections.

== Election result ==
The Conservatives gained two seats to have 40 councillors and a 31-seat majority on the council. They gained a seat in Eynsham and Cassington from the Liberal Democrats and regained Ducklington, which had previously been held by independent, former Conservative, councillor Steve Hayward.

Labour moved to become the second largest group on the council with five councillors after gaining one seat, while the Liberal Democrats dropped to three seats and only one independent councillor remained on the council. The UK Independence Party failed to win any seats, but came second in seven of the wards they contested, coming closest in Witney South where James Robertshaw was 152 votes behind Conservative David Harvey. All ten sitting councillors who stood were re-elected and overall turnout at the election was 39.03%.

West Oxfordshire local election result 2014
Party	Seats	Gains	Losses	Net gain/loss	Seats %	Votes %	Votes	+/−
Conservative	15	2	0	+2	88.2	49.3	10,435	-0.7%
Labour	1	1	0	+1	5.9	18.6	3,934	-6.8%
Liberal Democrats	1	0	1	-1	5.9	10.5	2,213	-6.9%
UKIP	0	0	0	0	0	12.7	2,690	+12.7%
Green	0	0	0	0	0	5.9	1,255	-1.3%
Independent	0	0	2	-2	0	3.0	632	+3.0%

== Ward results ==
Ascott and Shipton
Party	Candidate	Votes	%	±%
Conservative	Tom Simcox	478	62.6	−14.5
Labour	John Gittings	114	14.9	−8.0
Green	Celia Kerslake	96	12.6	+12.6
Liberal Democrats	Andrew Crick	75	9.8	+9.8
Majority		364	47.7	−6.5
Turnout		763	43.8	−34.2
Conservative hold		Swing		

Bampton and Clanfield
Party	Candidate	Votes	%	±%
Conservative	Martin Barrett	980	81.3	+9.5
Labour	Liz Blount	226	18.7	+18.7
Majority		754	62.5	+18.8
Turnout		1,206	42.0	−9.1
Conservative hold		Swing		

Brize Norton and Shilton
Party	Candidate	Votes	%	±%
Conservative	Alex Postan	395	55.0	−6.3
Independent	Shane Rae	323	45.0	+6.3
Majority		72	10.0	−12.6
Turnout		718	45.4	−28.1
Conservative hold		Swing		

Burford
Party	Candidate	Votes	%	±%
Conservative	Derek Cotterill	494	73.3	−3.4
UKIP	Erika Barnby	84	12.5	+12.5
Green	Rosie Pearson	56	8.3	+8.3
Labour	Andrew Ferrero	40	5.9	−1.3
Majority		410	60.8	+0.2
Turnout		674	45.4	−28.2
Conservative hold		Swing		

Carterton North East
Party	Candidate	Votes	%	±%
Conservative	Henry Howard	466	49.2	−17.4
UKIP	Barclay Lawrence	259	27.3	+27.3
Labour	Duncan Hume	128	13.5	+13.5
Green	Andy King	95	10.0	−4.5
Majority		207	21.8	−26.0
Turnout		948	24.4	−7.6
Conservative hold		Swing		

Carterton North West
Party	Candidate	Votes	%	±%
Conservative	Maxine Crossland	647	63.1	−9.5
Labour	Dave Wesson	208	20.3	+20.3
Green	Paul Creighton	170	16.6	−10.8
Majority		439	42.8	−2.3
Turnout		1,025	31.6	−9.3
Conservative hold		Swing		

Carterton South
Party	Candidate	Votes	%	±%
Conservative	Lynn Little	536	54.5	−14.8
UKIP	Leandra Edmands	285	29.0	+29.0
Labour	Michael Enright	91	9.2	−0.8
Green	Tony Barrett	72	7.3	+0.9
Majority		251	25.5	−29.5
Turnout		984	32.5	−8.4
Conservative hold		Swing		

Chipping Norton
Party	Candidate	Votes	%	±%
Labour	Laetisia Carter	927	45.2	−14.8
Conservative	Guy Wall	836	40.8	+0.8
UKIP	James Stanley	287	14.0	+14.0
Majority		91	4.4	−15.6
Turnout		2,050	44.2	+9.7
Labour gain from Independent		Swing		

Ducklington
Party	Candidate	Votes	%	±%
Conservative	Benjamin Woodruff	337	50.6	−11.6
UKIP	Lawrence Haar	151	22.7	+22.7
Labour	Richard Kelsall	119	17.9	+3.1
Green	Stuart MacDonald	59	8.9	+8.9
Majority		186	27.9	−11.3
Turnout		666	39.4	−37.6
Conservative gain from Independent		Swing		

Eynsham and Cassington
Party	Candidate	Votes	%	±%
Conservative	Peter Emery	822	39.7	+1.8
Liberal Democrats	Will Griffiths	492	23.8	−11.7
Labour	Judith Wardle	389	18.8	−0.1
UKIP	Jonathan Miller	368	17.8	+17.8
Majority		330	15.9	+13.4
Turnout		2,071	42.7	+4.7
Conservative gain from Liberal Democrats		Swing		

Freeland and Hanborough
Party	Candidate	Votes	%	±%
Conservative	Colin Dingwall	644	44.9	−1.1
Liberal Democrats	Mike Baggaley	443	30.9	−2.2
Labour	Lucy Tritton	200	13.9	+4.1
Green	Andrew Wright	147	10.3	−0.8
Majority		201	14.0	+1.1
Turnout		1,434	42.7	+3.5
Conservative hold		Swing		

Standlake, Aston and Stanton Harcourt
Party	Candidate	Votes	%	±%
Conservative	Steve Good	840	56.7	−9.3
UKIP	Clive Taylor	261	17.6	+17.6
Labour	Liam Carroll	140	9.5	−9.1
Liberal Democrats	Chris Blount	137	9.3	−2.7
Green	Alma Tumilowicz	103	7.0	+3.6
Majority		579	39.1	−8.3
Turnout		1,481	44.7	+8.6
Conservative hold		Swing		

Stonesfield and Tackley
Party	Candidate	Votes	%	±%
Conservative	Richard Bishop	742	56.1	−3.1
Labour	Georgia Mazower	328	24.8	+24.8
Liberal Democrats	Christopher Tatton	253	19.1	+5.1
Majority		414	31.3	−1.1
Turnout		1,323	42.4	+7.7
Conservative hold		Swing		

The Bartons
Party	Candidate	Votes	%	±%
Conservative	Robert Courts	389	61.9	−8.9
UKIP	Stephen Nash	141	22.5	+22.5
Liberal Democrats	Amanda Epps	98	15.6	−13.6
Majority		248	39.5	−2.2
Turnout		628	40.0	−34.4
Conservative hold		Swing		

Witney East
Party	Candidate	Votes	%	±%
Conservative	James Mills	879	42.4	−3.4
Labour	Alfred Fullah	594	28.7	−25.5
UKIP	James Mawle	279	13.5	+13.5
Green	Kate Griffin	210	10.1	+10.1
Liberal Democrats	Ross Beadle	109	5.3	+5.3
Majority		285	13.7	
Turnout		2,071	35.7	+4.4
Conservative hold		Swing		

Witney South
Party	Candidate	Votes	%	±%
Conservative	David Harvey	625	37.4	−7.6
UKIP	James Robertshaw	473	28.3	+28.3
Labour	Calvert McGibbon	338	20.2	−10.8
Green	Brigitte Hickman	160	9.6	−5.8
Liberal Democrats	Gillian Workman	76	4.5	−4.2
Majority		152	9.1	−4.9
Turnout		1,672	35.3	+8.1
Conservative hold		Swing		

Woodstock and Bladon
Party	Candidate	Votes	%	±%
Liberal Democrats	Julian Cooper	530	36.7	−15.9
Conservative	Sandy Rasch	325	22.5	−24.9
Independent	Brian Yoxall	182	12.6	+12.6
Independent	Sharone Parnes	127	8.8	+8.8
UKIP	Charles Bennett	102	7.1	+7.1
Labour	Trevor License	92	6.4	+6.4
Green	John O'Regan	87	6.0	+6.0
Majority		205	14.2	+8.9
Turnout		1,445	43.6	+5.3
Liberal Democrats hold		Swing		
