= 1999 West Oxfordshire District Council election =

1999 UK local government election

The 1999 West Oxfordshire District Council election took place on 6 May 1999 to elect members of West Oxfordshire District Council in Oxfordshire, England. One third of the council was up for election and the council stayed under no overall control.

After the election, the composition of the council was

- Conservative 19
- Liberal Democrats 13
- Independent 10
- Labour 7

== Election result ==
West Oxfordshire local election result 1999
Party	Seats	Gains	Losses	Net gain/loss	Seats %	Votes %	Votes	+/−
Conservative	8			+5	50.0	38.4	4,782	-0.6%
Liberal Democrats	4			+1	25.0	27.6	3,432	-1.3%
Independent	3			-3	18.8	15.5	1,926	+9.1%
Labour	1			-3	6.3	17.8	2,217	-7.6%
Green	0			0	0	0.7	81	+0.5%

== Ward results ==
Carterton North
Party	Candidate	Votes	%	±%
Conservative	Reginald Mason	548	54.4	+4.9
Labour	John Rowe	311	30.9	+12.4
Liberal Democrats	Richard Harold	148	14.7	−0.2
Majority		237	23.5	−7.4
Turnout		1,007	21.0	+0.3

Carterton South
Party	Candidate	Votes	%	±%
Conservative	Windell Walcott	627	73.0	+23.7
Liberal Democrats	Peter Madden	232	27.0	−2.8
Majority		395	46.0	+26.5
Turnout		859	28.8	+6.5

Chadlington
Party	Candidate	Votes	%	±%
Conservative	Brian Stacey	225	47.4	
Independent	Christopher Lyden	144	30.3	
Liberal Democrats	Emma Tatton	106	22.3	
Majority		81	17.1	
Turnout		475	45.1	

Chipping North
Party	Candidate	Votes	%	±%
Independent	John Hannis	625	47.0	+47.0
Labour	Georgina Burrows	432	32.5	−28.1
Independent	Richard Soper	204	15.3	+15.3
Liberal Democrats	David Davies	68	5.1	+5.1
Majority		193	14.5	
Turnout		1,329	30.2	+3.6

Clanfield and Shilton
Party	Candidate	Votes	%	±%
Conservative	Angela Neale	unopposed		

Coombe and Stonesfield
Party	Candidate	Votes	%	±%
Independent	Derrick Millard	670	72.2	
Liberal Democrats	Gareth Epps	258	27.8	
Majority		412	44.4	
Turnout		928	53.6	

Ducklington
Party	Candidate	Votes	%	±%
Conservative	Stephen Hayward	255	58.8	
Labour	Sheila Cuss	126	29.0	
Liberal Democrats	Stephen Copestake	53	12.2	
Majority		129	29.7	
Turnout		434	34.3	

Enstone
Party	Candidate	Votes	%	±%
Independent	Elizabeth Higgs	212	46.1	
Conservative	Sandra Rasch	126	27.4	
Labour	Stephen Hague	98	21.3	
Liberal Democrats	Geoffrey Walton	24	5.3	
Majority		86	18.7	
Turnout		460	36.5	

Eynsham
Party	Candidate	Votes	%	±%
Liberal Democrats	David Rossiter	777	71.5	+11.0
Conservative	David Dawes	228	21.0	−0.4
Green	Mark Stevenson	81	7.5	+7.5
Majority		549	50.6	+11.5
Turnout		1,086	29.5	−1.0

Filkins and Langford
Party	Candidate	Votes	%	±%
Conservative	Donald Seale	344	74.0	−0.3
Labour	Raymond Gibbons	121	26.0	+0.3
Majority		223	48.0	−0.7
Turnout		465	47.8	+6.1

Finstock and Leafield
Party	Candidate	Votes	%	±%
Liberal Democrats	Stuart Jauncey	328	57.3	
Conservative	Rodney Rose	173	30.2	
Independent	David Gore	71	12.4	
Majority		155	27.1	
Turnout		572	47.0	

Hailey
Party	Candidate	Votes	%	±%
Conservative	George Kellow	426	75.4	
Labour	William Tumbridge	91	16.1	
Liberal Democrats	Malcolm West	48	8.5	
Majority		335	59.3	
Turnout		565	37.4	

Witney East
Party	Candidate	Votes	%	±%
Liberal Democrats	Stephen Holborough	706	58.3	
Conservative	Martin Chapman	506	41.7	
Majority		200	16.5	
Turnout		1,212	32.0	

Witney North
Party	Candidate	Votes	%	±%
Liberal Democrats	Philip Workman	403	49.4	+15.1
Conservative	Clive Knowles	289	35.4	−0.8
Labour	John Ryall	124	15.2	−14.3
Majority		114	14.0	
Turnout		816	33.9	+8.7

Witney South
Party	Candidate	Votes	%	±%
Conservative	Ross McFarlane	627	48.3	−5.8
Labour	Raymond Harris	482	37.1	−8.8
Liberal Democrats	Olive Minett	190	14.6	+14.6
Majority		145	11.2	+3.0
Turnout		1,299	24.6	+0.7

Witney West
Party	Candidate	Votes	%	±%
Labour	Edward Cooper	432	46.4	
Conservative	Andrew Creery	408	43.8	
Liberal Democrats	Richard Willis	91	9.8	
Majority		24	2.6	
Turnout		931	30.5	

== By-elections between 1999 and 2000 ==
Carterton South by-election 30 September 1999
Party	Candidate	Votes	%	±%
Conservative		341	46.3	−26.7
Liberal Democrats		310	42.1	+15.1
Labour		86	11.7	+11.7
Majority		31	4.2	−41.8
Turnout		737	24.4	−4.4
Conservative hold		Swing		
