= 2006 West Oxfordshire District Council election =

2006 UK local government election

Map of the results of the 2006 West Oxfordshire District Council election. Conservatives in blue, Liberal Democrats in yellow and Independent in light grey. Wards in dark grey were not contested in 2006.

The 2006 West Oxfordshire District Council election took place on 4 May 2006 to elect members of West Oxfordshire District Council in Oxfordshire, England. One third of the council was up for election and the Conservative Party stayed in overall control of the council.

After the election, the composition of the council was:

- Conservative 34
- Liberal Democrats 9
- Independent 5
- Labour 1

== Background ==
After the last election in 2004 the Conservatives controlled the council with 29 councillors, while the Liberal Democrats had 13 seats, Independents had six and the Labour Party had one seat. However, in April 2005 Conservative councillor Peter Green resigned from the party to sit as an independent, meaning that going into the 2006 election the Conservatives had 28 seats and there were 7 independents.

For the 16 seats contested in 2006, the Conservatives had 16 candidates, Labour 13, Liberal Democrats 11, Green Party 7 and there were 3 Independents.

== Election result ==
The Conservatives increased their majority on the council after gaining six seats to take 14 of the 16 seats contested. This took the Conservatives to 34 councillors and came at the expense of the Liberal Democrats, who lost four seats, and the independents who lost two seats. The Liberal Democrats were therefore reduced to nine councillors and the independents to five, while Labour remained with a single councillor. Of the 10 councillors who sought re-election, nine were successful, with only Liberal Democrat Julian Cooper losing in Woodstock and Bladon ward by 34 votes to Conservative candidate Jill Dunsmore. Overall turnout at the election was 40.25%.

West Oxfordshire local election result 2006
Party	Seats	Gains	Losses	Net gain/loss	Seats %	Votes %	Votes	+/−
Conservative	14	6	0	+6	87.5	59.6	11,471	+13.1%
Liberal Democrats	1	0	4	-4	6.3	20.0	3,850	-10.4%
Independent	1	0	2	-2	6.3	6.6	1,273	+0.8%
Labour	0	0	0	0	0	9.3	1,793	-0.9%
Green	0	0	0	0	0	4.5	866	-2.6%

== Ward results ==
Ascott and Shipton
Party	Candidate	Votes	%	±%
Conservative	Hilary Hibbert-Biles	649	78.6	+21.2
Labour	John Gittings	92	11.1	+11.1
Liberal Democrats	John Miller	85	10.3	+10.3
Majority		557	67.4	+52.6
Turnout		826	50.3	+3.2
Conservative hold		Swing		

Bampton and Clanfield
Party	Candidate	Votes	%	±%
Independent	Martin Barrett	856	57.6	+57.6
Conservative	Frederick Gray	558	37.5	−15.9
Labour	Mark Albert	73	4.9	+4.9
Majority		298	20.1	
Turnout		1,487	51.9	+13.5
Independent hold		Swing		

Brize Norton and Shilton
Party	Candidate	Votes	%	±%
Conservative	Verena Hunt	490	76.3	
Independent	Shane Rae	120	18.7	
Labour	Duncan Enright	32	5.0	
Majority		370	57.6	
Turnout		642	43.0	
Conservative hold		Swing		

Burford
Party	Candidate	Votes	%	±%
Conservative	Derek Cotterill	556	79.8	+36.3
Liberal Democrats	John Lilly	104	14.9	+14.9
Labour	Matthew Deans	37	5.3	+5.3
Majority		452	64.9	
Turnout		697	50.0	+2.7
Conservative gain from Independent		Swing		

Carterton North East
Party	Candidate	Votes	%	±%
Conservative	Reginald Mason	486	62.1	−8.5
Independent	Paul Wesson	297	37.9	+37.9
Majority		189	24.1	−17.0
Turnout		783	25.3	+7.9
Conservative hold		Swing		

Carterton North West
Party	Candidate	Votes	%	±%
Conservative	David King	846	83.8	+29.5
Labour	Raymond Harris	163	16.2	+4.6
Majority		683	67.7	+47.6
Turnout		1,009	31.2	+4.7
Conservative hold		Swing		

Carterton South
Party	Candidate	Votes	%	±%
Conservative	Windell Walcott	892	81.2	+31.8
Liberal Democrats	Peter Madden	206	18.8	−23.0
Majority		686	62.5	+54.9
Turnout		1,098	34.9	+6.4
Conservative hold		Swing		

Chipping Norton
Party	Candidate	Votes	%	±%
Conservative	Robert Townley	1,198	61.0	+12.0
Labour	Robert Evans	533	27.2	+2.9
Liberal Democrats	Elizabeth Allen	138	7.0	−11.4
Green	Brian Luney	94	4.8	−3.5
Majority		665	33.9	+9.2
Turnout		1,963	42.8	−1.3
Conservative gain from Independent		Swing		

Ducklington
Party	Candidate	Votes	%	±%
Conservative	Stephen Hayward	443	67.1	+13.6
Labour	William Tumbridge	91	13.8	−8.8
Liberal Democrats	Gillian Workman	76	11.5	−12.4
Green	Richard Dossett-Davies	50	7.6	+7.6
Majority		352	53.3	+23.6
Turnout		660	41.4	+5.6
Conservative hold		Swing		

Eynsham and Cassington
Party	Candidate	Votes	%	±%
Conservative	Frances Pike	867	45.6	+10.9
Liberal Democrats	Richard Andrews	763	40.2	−14.6
Green	Xanthe Bevis	160	8.4	−2.1
Labour	Richard Kelsall	110	5.8	+5.8
Majority		104	5.4	
Turnout		1,900	42.2	−0.8
Conservative gain from Liberal Democrats		Swing		

Freeland and Hanborough
Party	Candidate	Votes	%	±%
Conservative	Colin Dingwall	732	48.9	+4.8
Liberal Democrats	Michael Baggaley	604	40.4	−15.5
Green	Jill Jones	100	6.7	+6.7
Labour	Georgina Burrows	60	4.0	+4.0
Majority		128	8.5	
Turnout		1,496	45.7	−6.4
Conservative gain from Liberal Democrats		Swing		

Standlake, Aston and Stanton Harcourt
Party	Candidate	Votes	%	±%
Liberal Democrats	Brenda Smith	779	51.7	+0.0
Conservative	Elizabeth Fenton	729	48.3	+0.0
Majority		50	3.3	−0.2
Turnout		1,508	47.6	−4.5
Liberal Democrats hold		Swing		

The Bartons
Party	Candidate	Votes	%	±%
Conservative	William Goffe	474	80.7	
Labour	Colin Carritt	113	19.3	
Majority		361	61.4	
Turnout		587	38.0	
Conservative hold		Swing		

Witney East
Party	Candidate	Votes	%	±%
Conservative	James Mills	959	60.9	+11.5
Liberal Democrats	Paul Slamin	275	17.5	−6.2
Green	Enid Dossett-Davies	217	13.8	−1.4
Labour	David Wesson	123	7.8	−4.0
Majority		684	43.5	+17.8
Turnout		1,574	34.2	−4.1
Conservative gain from Liberal Democrats		Swing		

Witney South
Party	Candidate	Votes	%	±%
Conservative	Anthony Harvey	944	60.9	+8.2
Labour	Phillip Edney	246	15.9	−3.4
Liberal Democrats	Michelle Coulson	206	13.3	−3.9
Green	Sandra Simpson	153	9.9	−0.9
Majority		698	45.1	+11.8
Turnout		1,549	34.2	−2.1
Conservative hold		Swing		

Woodstock and Bladon
Party	Candidate	Votes	%	±%
Conservative	Jill Dunsmore	648	44.0	+0.1
Liberal Democrats	Julian Cooper	614	41.7	+7.3
Labour	Susan Roberts	120	8.1	−5.0
Green	Paul Creighton	92	6.2	−2.5
Majority		34	2.3	−7.3
Turnout		1,474	49.1	−4.6
Conservative gain from Liberal Democrats		Swing		

== By-elections between 2006 and 2007 ==
A by-election was held in Witney Central on 25 January 2007 after the disappearance of Conservative councillor Andrew Creery. The seat was held for Conservatives by Colin Adams with a majority of 210 votes over Liberal Democrat Brenda Churchill.

Witney Central by-election 25 January 2007
Party	Candidate	Votes	%	±%
Conservative	Colin Adams	417	53.5	+10.6
Liberal Democrats	Brenda Churchill	207	26.6	+8.8
Labour	David Wesson	87	11.2	−16.5
Green	Sandra Simpson	68	8.7	−2.9
Majority		210	27.0	+11.9
Turnout		779	25.1	−16.0
Conservative hold		Swing		
