= 1998 West Oxfordshire District Council election =

1998 UK local government election

The 1998 West Oxfordshire District Council election took place on 7 May 1998 to elect members of West Oxfordshire District Council in Oxfordshire, England. One third of the council was up for election and the council stayed under no overall control.

After the election, the composition of the council was

- Conservative 14
- Independent 13
- Liberal Democrats 12
- Labour 10

== Background ==
Before the election there were 15 independent councillors, the Liberal Democrats had 14 seats, Labour had 11 and the Conservatives had 9. An alliance between the Liberal Democrats and the Labour party controlled the council with a majority of one seat.

Among the councillors who stood down at the election was independent David Walker, who had quit the Conservatives in the early 1990s over the poll tax, as well as Patrick Madden, Peg McWilliam, Elizabeth Mortimer and Susan Swann. 49 candidates stood for the 18 seats that were contested in 1998, including one candidate from the Green party, with the Liberal Democrats defending the most seats at eight.

== Election result ==
The Conservatives became the largest group on the council after gaining five seats.

West Oxfordshire local election result 1998
Party	Seats	Gains	Losses	Net gain/loss	Seats %	Votes %	Votes	+/−
Conservative	9	5	0	+5	50.0	39.0	5,758	
Liberal Democrats	6	0	2	-2	33.3	28.9	4,262	
Independent	2	0	2	-2	11.1	6.4	949	
Labour	1	0	1	-1	5.6	25.4	3,752	
Green	0	0	0	0	0	0.2	27	

== Ward results ==
Ascott and Shipton
Party	Candidate	Votes	%	±%
Independent	Robert Barrett	295	45.9	
Conservative	Rodney Rose	240	37.3	
Labour	Frances Ashworth	108	16.8	
Majority		55	8.6	
Turnout		643	41.4	
Independent hold		Swing		

Aston Bampton and Standlake
Party	Candidate	Votes	%	±%
Liberal Democrats	Brenda Smith	576	74.7	
Conservative	Martin Chapman	153	19.8	
Labour	Christine Ainsley-Cowlishaw	42	5.4	
Majority		423	54.9	
Turnout		771	38.4	
Liberal Democrats hold		Swing		

Bampton
Party	Candidate	Votes	%	±%
Independent	Jonathan Phillips	480	83.2	
Labour	Duncan Enright	59	10.2	
Liberal Democrats	Gareth Epps	38	6.6	
Majority		421	73.0	
Turnout		577	28.9	
Independent hold		Swing		

Bartons
Party	Candidate	Votes	%	±%
Conservative	William Goffe	243	56.1	
Liberal Democrats	Richard Noviss	117	27.0	
Labour	Matthew Deans	73	16.9	
Majority		126	29.1	
Turnout		433	29.5	
Conservative hold		Swing		

Bladon and Cassington
Party	Candidate	Votes	%	±%
Conservative	Louise Chapman	306	58.4	
Labour	Laurence Whitehead	218	41.6	
Majority		88	16.8	
Turnout		524	43.5	
Conservative hold		Swing		

Brize Norton and Curbridge
Party	Candidate	Votes	%	±%
Conservative	Verena Hunt	462	60.8	
Labour	William Tumbridge	204	26.8	
Liberal Democrats	David Rossiter	94	12.4	
Majority		258	33.9	
Turnout		760	25.7	
Conservative gain from Independent		Swing		

Burford
Party	Candidate	Votes	%	±%
Liberal Democrats	Christopher Davis	383	49.5	
Conservative	Mary Sanderson	329	42.5	
Labour	Alison Bettle	35	4.5	
Green	Ann Edmonds	27	3.5	
Majority		54	7.0	
Turnout		774	46.8	
Liberal Democrats hold		Swing		

Carterton North
Party	Candidate	Votes	%	±%
Conservative	Charles Marlow	502	49.5	
Labour	William Stevenson	188	18.5	
Independent	Keith Stone	174	17.1	
Liberal Democrats	Richard Harold	151	14.9	
Majority		314	30.9	
Turnout		1,015	20.7	
Conservative gain from Independent		Swing		

Carterton South
Party	Candidate	Votes	%	±%
Conservative	Paul Wesson	331	49.3	
Liberal Democrats	Peter Madden	200	29.8	
Labour	John Rowe	141	21.0	
Majority		131	19.5	
Turnout		672	22.3	
Conservative gain from Liberal Democrats		Swing		

Charlbury
Party	Candidate	Votes	%	±%
Liberal Democrats	Christopher Tatton	686	60.2	
Labour	Reginald James	252	22.1	
Conservative	Brian Stacey	201	17.6	
Majority		434	38.1	
Turnout		1,139	49.7	
Liberal Democrats hold		Swing		

Chipping Norton
Party	Candidate	Votes	%	±%
Labour	Evelyn Coles	717	60.6	
Conservative	Rosalind Stroud	466	39.4	
Majority		251	21.2	
Turnout		1,183	26.6	
Labour hold		Swing		

Clanfield and Shilton
Party	Candidate	Votes	%	±%
Conservative	Angela Neale	286	68.6	
Labour	Sally Webster	131	31.4	
Majority		155	37.2	
Turnout		417	28.5	
Conservative hold		Swing		

Eynsham
Party	Candidate	Votes	%	±%
Liberal Democrats	Harry Wyatt	675	60.5	
Conservative	Stephen Hayward	239	21.4	
Labour	Christopher Miles	202	18.1	
Majority		436	39.1	
Turnout		1,116	30.5	
Liberal Democrats hold		Swing		

Filkins and Langford
Party	Candidate	Votes	%	±%
Conservative	Donald Seale	307	74.3	
Labour	Michael Enright	106	25.7	
Majority		201	48.7	
Turnout		413	41.7	
Conservative hold		Swing		

Freeland and Hanborough
Party	Candidate	Votes	%	±%
Liberal Democrats	David James	527	43.4	
Conservative	David Dawes	522	43.0	
Labour	Kim Simkin	165	13.6	
Majority		5	0.4	
Turnout		1,214	37.5	
Liberal Democrats hold		Swing		

Witney North
Party	Candidate	Votes	%	±%
Conservative	David Robertson	218	36.2	
Liberal Democrats	Brenda Churchill	207	34.3	
Labour	John Ryall	178	29.5	
Majority		11	1.8	
Turnout		603	25.2	
Conservative gain from Liberal Democrats		Swing		

Witney South
Party	Candidate	Votes	%	±%
Conservative	Anthony Harvey	686	54.1	
Labour	Frederick Saxby	582	45.9	
Majority		104	8.2	
Turnout		1,268	23.9	
Conservative gain from Labour		Swing		

Woodstock
Party	Candidate	Votes	%	±%
Liberal Democrats	Julian Cooper	608	49.6	
Labour	Ian Baxter	351	28.6	
Conservative	Sandra Rasch	267	21.8	
Majority		257	21.0	
Turnout		1,226	49.7	
Liberal Democrats hold		Swing		
