= 2023 West Oxfordshire District Council election =

2023 UK local government election

← 2022	4 May 2023	2024 →

17 out of 49 seats to West Oxfordshire District Council 25 seats needed for a majority

	First party	Second party	Third party
Leader	Andy Graham	Michele Mead	Duncan Enright
Party	Liberal Democrats	Conservative	Labour
Last election	14 seats, 36.0%	23 seats, 37.4%	8 seats, 19.3%
Seats before	15	19	9
Seats won	6	6	4
Seats after	18	17	10
Seat change	▲3	▼3	▲1
Popular vote	6,581	8,642	4,889
Percentage	28.2%	37.1%	21.0%
Swing	▼7.8%	▼0.3%	▲1.7%
	Fourth party	Fifth party
Leader	Rosie Pearson	Richard Langridge
Party	Green	Independent
Last election	2 seats, 6.4%	2 seats, 0.8%
Seats before	2	3
Seats won	1	0
Seats after	3	1
Seat change	▲1	▼2
Popular vote	2,112	947
Percentage	9.1%	9.1%
Swing	▲2.7%	▲2.7%
- Winner of each seat at the 2023 West Oxfordshire District Council election
Leader before election
Andy Graham
Liberal Democrat
No overall control
Leader after election
Andy Graham
Liberal Democrat
No overall control

The 2023 West Oxfordshire District Council election took place on 4 May 2023 to elect members of West Oxfordshire District Council in Oxfordshire, England. This was on the same day as other local elections in England. There were 17 of the 49 seats on the council being contested, being the usual nominal third of the council.

== Summary ==
Prior to the election the council was under no overall control. The Conservatives were the largest party, but the council was run by a coalition of the Liberal Democrats, Labour and Greens, led by Liberal Democrat councillor Andy Graham. The council remained under no overall control after the election; the Liberal Democrats overtook the Conservatives to become the largest party, and the same coalition continued to run the council.

=== Election result ===
2023 West Oxfordshire District Council election
Party	This election			Full council			This election		
Party	Seats	Net	Seats %	Other	Total	Total %	Votes	Votes %	+/−
Liberal Democrats	6	▲3	35.3	12	18	36.7	6,581	28.2	–7.8
Conservative	6	▼3	35.3	11	17	34.7	8,642	37.1	–0.3
Labour	4	▲1	23.5	6	10	20.4	4,889	21.0	+1.7
Green	1	▲1	5.9	2	3	6.1	2,112	9.1	+2.7
Independent	0	▼2	0.0	1	1	2.0	947	4.1	+3.3
Heritage	0	Steady	0.0	0	0	0.0	129	0.6	+0.4

The overall turnout was 36.37%, from an electorate of 64,450 people.

== Ward results ==
The Statement of Persons Nominated, which details the candidates standing in each ward, was released by West Oxfordshire District Council following the close of nominations on 4 April 2023. The results by ward were as below.

=== Alvescot and Filkins ===
Alvescot and Filkins
Party	Candidate	Votes	%	±%
Conservative	Edward James	285	47.1	−1.9
Independent	Pete Handley	122	20.2	N/A
Labour	George Richmond	121	20.0	+1.0
Green	Miles Gibson	77	12.7	+1.6
Majority		163	26.9	
Turnout		605	42.67	
Registered electors		1,425		
Conservative hold		Swing		

=== Bampton and Clanfield ===
Bampton and Clanfield
Party	Candidate	Votes	%	±%
Liberal Democrats	Alistair Wray	638	46.8	+0.1
Conservative	Ted Fenton*	606	44.4	+0.7
Green	Matt Morton	67	4.9	+0.4
Labour	Georgia Meadows	53	3.9	−1.2
Majority		32	2.4	
Turnout		1,364	40.62	
Registered electors		3,380		
Liberal Democrats gain from Conservative		Swing		

=== Carterton North East ===
Carterton North East
Party	Candidate	Votes	%	±%
Liberal Democrats	David Melvin	515	49.5	+5.4
Conservative	Emma Leeming	364	35.0	−9.6
Labour	Shaun Harley	108	10.4	N/A
Heritage	Stephen Breedon	53	5.1	N/A
Majority		151	14.5	
Turnout		1,040	25.57	
Registered electors		4,095		
Liberal Democrats gain from Conservative		Swing		

=== Carterton North West ===
Carterton North West
Party	Candidate	Votes	%	±%
Liberal Democrats	Phil Godfrey	550	46.0	+7.6
Conservative	Jill Bull*	424	35.5	−2.5
Labour Co-op	Dave Wesson	95	7.9	+1.3
Heritage	David Cox	76	6.4	+3.1
Green	Tony Barrett	51	4.3	N/A
Majority		126	10.5	
Turnout		1,196	30.79	
Registered electors		3,910		
Liberal Democrats gain from Conservative		Swing		

=== Carterton South ===
Carterton South
Party	Candidate	Votes	%	±%
Conservative	Michele Mead*	437	43.4	−21.6
Liberal Democrats	Liz Wood	400	39.7	+4.7
Labour	Marion Harley	105	10.4	N/A
No Description	Lynn Little	65	6.5	N/A
Majority		37	3.7	
Turnout		1,007	30.38	
Registered electors		3,338		
Conservative hold		Swing		

=== Charlbury and Finstock ===
Charlbury and Finstock
Party	Candidate	Votes	%	±%
Liberal Democrats	Andy Graham*	844	59.0	+4.4
Conservative	Caspar Morris	337	23.6	−1.6
Green	Liz Reason	141	9.9	−2.8
Labour Co-op	Sian O'Neill	108	7.6	+0.1
Majority		507	35.4	
Turnout		1,430	47.2	
Registered electors		3,038		
Liberal Democrats hold		Swing		

=== Chipping Norton ===
Chipping Norton
Party	Candidate	Votes	%	±%
Labour Co-op	Mark Walker	672	38.9	−22.1
Conservative	Peter Burns	393	22.7	−7.2
Independent	Mike Cahill*	370	21.4	N/A
Green	Arron Baker	181	10.5	N/A
Liberal Democrats	Ivan Aguado Melet	113	6.5	−2.6
Majority		279	16.2	
Turnout		1,729	30.68	
Registered electors		5,662		
Labour Co-op gain from Independent		Swing		

=== Ducklington ===
Ducklington (by-election)
Party	Candidate	Votes	%	±%
Conservative	Adrian Walsh	355	41.8	−6.2
Liberal Democrats	Stephen Cosier	347	40.9	N/A
Labour	Reuben Oreffo	147	17.3	−22.4
Majority		8	0.9	
Turnout		849	40.94	
Registered electors		2,096		
Conservative hold		Swing		

=== Eynsham and Cassington ===
Eynsham and Cassington
Party	Candidate	Votes	%	±%
Liberal Democrats	Dan Levy*	1,149	57.7	−5.4
Conservative	Sean Grace	486	24.4	+2.5
Green	Nicholas Goodwin	167	8.4	+2.0
Labour	Jacob Withington	149	7.5	−1.0
Independent	Ricardo Silva	40	2.0	N/A
Majority		663	33.3	
Turnout		1,991	39.81	
Registered electors		5,019		
Liberal Democrats hold		Swing		

=== Hailey, Minster Lovell and Leafield ===
Hailey, Minster Lovell and Leafield
Party	Candidate	Votes	%	±%
Conservative	Liam Walker	704	49.1	−6.0
Liberal Democrats	Paul Marsh	631	44.0	−0.9
Labour	Georgia Mazower	100	7.0	N/A
Majority		73	5.1	
Turnout		1,435	42.44	
Registered electors		3,400		
Conservative hold		Swing		

=== Kingham, Rollright and Enstone ===
Kingham, Rollright and Enstone
Party	Candidate	Votes	%	±%
Conservative	Andrew Beaney*	570	50.1	−4.2
Green	Barry Wheatley	339	29.8	+17.6
Labour Co-op	David Heyes	229	20.1	−4.2
Majority		231	20.3	
Turnout		1,138	35.91	
Registered electors		3,194		
Conservative hold		Swing		

=== Stonesfield and Tackley ===
Stonesfield and Tackley
Party	Candidate	Votes	%	±%
Liberal Democrats	Tim Sumner	708	45.6	+5.6
Conservative	Richard Jackson	512	33.0	−5.6
Labour	Kate England	173	11.2	+3.2
Green	Genny Early	158	10.2	−3.2
Majority		196	12.6	
Turnout		1,551	45.29	
Registered electors		3,440		
Liberal Democrats hold		Swing		

=== Witney Central ===
Witney Central
Party	Candidate	Votes	%	±%
Labour	Andrew Lyon	565	42.2	−10.7
Conservative	Abdul Mubin	550	41.1	+6.8
Green	Harriet Kopinska	114	8.5	+2.0
Liberal Democrats	Mark Morgenroth	109	8.1	+3.6
Majority		15	1.1	
Turnout		1,338	31.61	
Registered electors		4,265		
Labour hold		Swing		

=== Witney East ===
Witney East
Party	Candidate	Votes	%	±%
Labour Co-op	Joy Aitman*	877	41.5	−6.0
Conservative	James Robertshaw	828	39.2	+3.2
Green	Ben Fleetwood	246	11.6	+4.0
Liberal Democrats	Hannah Bailey	163	7.7	−1.1
Majority		49	2.3	
Turnout		2,114	37.42	
Registered electors		5,668		
Labour hold		Swing		

=== Witney North ===
Witney North
Party	Candidate	Votes	%	±%
Green	Sandra Simpson	493	36.4	−5.3
Independent	Richard Langridge*	350	25.8	N/A
Conservative	Toby Morris	298	22.0	−9.3
Labour	Andy Bailey	214	15.8	−6.8
Majority		143	10.6	
Turnout		1,355	44.93	
Registered electors		3,029		
Green gain from Independent		Swing		

=== Witney South ===
Witney South
Party	Candidate	Votes	%	±%
Labour	Rachel Crouch	766	46.3	+0.2
Conservative	David Edwards-Hughes	728	44.0	+1.9
Liberal Democrats	Peter Whitten	161	9.7	N/A
Majority		38	2.3	
Turnout		1,655	35.28	
Registered electors		4,754		
Labour hold		Swing		

=== Witney West ===
Witney West
Party	Candidate	Votes	%	±%
Conservative	Thomas Ashby	765	50.9	−1.6
Labour Co-op	Stuart McCarroll	407	27.1	−2.7
Liberal Democrats	David Smith	253	16.8	+6.1
Green	Frances Mortimer	78	5.2	−1.8
Majority		358	23.8	
Turnout		1,503	31.96	
Registered electors		4,737		
Conservative hold		Swing		
