= 2012 West Oxfordshire District Council election =

2012 UK local government election

Map of the results of the 2012 West Oxfordshire District Council election. Conservatives in blue, Labour in red and Liberal Democrats in yellow. Wards in dark grey were not contested in 2012.

The 2012 West Oxfordshire District Council election took place on 3 May 2012 to elect members of West Oxfordshire District Council in Oxfordshire, England. One third of the council was up for election and the Conservative Party stayed in overall control of the council.

After the election, the composition of the council was:

- Conservative 41
- Labour 4
- Liberal Democrats 4

== Background ==
After the last election in 2011 the Conservatives controlled the council with 44 councillors, while the Liberal Democrats had four seats and Labour had one seat. 17 seats were contested in 2012, with the Conservative Party having a full 17 candidates, while Labour had 13, the Liberal Democrats 10 and the Green Party had nine candidates.

== Election result ==
The Conservatives lost three seats to Labour, but remained in control of the council with 41 councillors. The three Labour gains came in the wards of Chipping Norton, Witney Central and Witney East, taking the party to four seats on the council. This was level with the Liberal Democrats, who remained on four seats, but Liberal Democrat Elizabeth Poskitt did defeat the new Conservative leader of Oxfordshire County Council, Ian Hudspeth, in Woodstock and Bladon by 65 votes. The three Labour gains came in wards with no Liberal Democrat or Green candidates, while the Liberal Democrat gain came in a ward with no Labour or Green candidates, although the parties denied there had been any arrangement. Overall eight of the 11 councillors who stood were re-elected, while average turnout at the election was 34.77%.

West Oxfordshire local election result 2012
Party	Seats	Gains	Losses	Net gain/loss	Seats %	Votes %	Votes	+/−
Conservative	12	1	4	-3	70.6	50.0	9,650	-5.0%
Labour	3	3	0	+3	17.6	25.4	4,913	+8.0%
Liberal Democrats	2	1	1	0	11.8	17.4	3,359	+6.4%
Green	0	0	0	0	0	7.2	1,396	-6.2%

== Ward results ==
Chadlington and Churchill
Party	Candidate	Votes	%	±%
Conservative	Neil Owen	455	72.9	−5.5
Labour	David Heyes	78	12.5	+12.5
Green	Brigitte Hickman	54	8.7	+8.7
Liberal Democrats	Amanda Epps	37	5.9	−15.7
Majority		377	60.4	+15.1
Turnout		624	39.2	−6.1
Conservative hold		Swing		

Charlbury and Finstock
Party	Candidate	Votes	%	±%
Liberal Democrats	Liz Leffman	956	66.8	+28.3
Conservative	Rory MacArthur	476	33.2	−7.6
Majority		480	33.6	
Turnout		1,432	49.3	−10.0
Liberal Democrats hold		Swing		

Chipping Norton
Party	Candidate	Votes	%	±%
Labour	Robert Evans	966	60.0	+23.4
Conservative	Patrick McHugh	644	40.0	+5.3
Majority		322	20.0	+18.0
Turnout		1,610	34.5	−17.5
Labour gain from Conservative		Swing		

Eynsham and Cassington
Party	Candidate	Votes	%	±%
Conservative	Edward James	677	37.9	0.0
Liberal Democrats	Richard Andrews	633	35.5	−0.6
Labour	Sarah Homer	337	18.9	+1.5
Green	Sarah MacDonald	138	7.7	−0.9
Majority		44	2.5	+0.7
Turnout		1,785	38.0	−12.6
Conservative gain from Liberal Democrats		Swing		

Freeland and Hanborough
Party	Candidate	Votes	%	±%
Conservative	Toby Morris	607	46.0	−3.8
Liberal Democrats	Michael Baggaley	437	33.1	−5.7
Green	Austen Naughten	147	11.1	+6.3
Labour	Adam Radford	130	9.8	+3.3
Majority		170	12.9	+1.9
Turnout		1,321	39.2	−37.7
Conservative hold		Swing		

Hailey, Minster Lovell and Leafield
Party	Candidate	Votes	%	±%
Conservative	Simon Hoare	572	53.9	−12.7
Labour	Mary Jay	246	23.2	+10.2
Liberal Democrats	Andrew Crick	124	11.7	+1.9
Green	Andrew Wright	120	11.3	+0.7
Majority		326	30.7	−22.9
Turnout		1,062	34.0	−15.5
Conservative hold		Swing		

Kingham, Rollright and Enstone
Party	Candidate	Votes	%	±%
Conservative	Nick Colston	799	71.5	+2.8
Labour	Charles Watson	318	28.5	+10.9
Majority		481	43.1	−8.0
Turnout		1,117	34.8	−16.2
Conservative hold		Swing		

Milton under Wychwood
Party	Candidate	Votes	%	±%
Conservative	Jeffrey Haine	unopposed		
Conservative hold		Swing		

North Leigh
Party	Candidate	Votes	%	±%
Conservative	Barry Norton	459	69.0	
Labour	Judith Wardle	206	31.0	
Majority		253	38.0	
Turnout		665	42.1	
Conservative hold		Swing		

Standlake, Aston and Stanton Harcourt
Party	Candidate	Votes	%	±%
Conservative	Hilary Fenton	776	66.0	+8.8
Labour	Michael Enright	219	18.6	+18.6
Liberal Democrats	Elizabeth Mortimer	141	12.0	−30.8
Green	Alma Tumilowicz	40	3.4	+3.4
Majority		557	47.4	+32.9
Turnout		1,176	36.1	−41.9
Conservative hold		Swing		

Stonesfield and Tackley
Party	Candidate	Votes	%	±%
Conservative	Derrick Millard	648	59.2	−2.0
Green	Harriet Kopinska	293	26.8	+2.8
Liberal Democrats	Geoffrey Walton	153	14.0	−0.7
Majority		355	32.4	−4.8
Turnout		1,094	34.7	−21.3
Conservative hold		Swing		

Witney Central
Party	Candidate	Votes	%	±%
Labour	Andrew Coles	647	52.6	+16.6
Conservative	Colin Adams	584	47.4	−3.7
Majority		63	5.2	
Turnout		1,231	31.3	−10.1
Labour gain from Conservative		Swing		

Witney East
Party	Candidate	Votes	%	±%
Labour	Duncan Enright	983	54.2	+14.6
Conservative	Jeanette Baker	831	45.8	+1.2
Majority		152	8.4	
Turnout		1,814	31.3	−13.1
Labour gain from Conservative		Swing		

Witney North
Party	Candidate	Votes	%	±%
Conservative	David Snow	450	43.5	−10.3
Green	Stuart MacDonald	286	27.6	+10.0
Labour	Alfred Fullah	179	17.3	+2.9
Liberal Democrats	Ross Beadle	120	11.6	−2.6
Majority		164	15.8	−20.4
Turnout		1,035	32.5	−15.0
Conservative hold		Swing		

Witney South
Party	Candidate	Votes	%	±%
Conservative	Jane Doughty	577	45.0	−3.1
Labour	Laura Price	397	31.0	+10.2
Green	Kate Griffin	197	15.4	+6.7
Liberal Democrats	Olive Minett	111	8.7	+2.2
Majority		180	14.0	−13.3
Turnout		1,282	27.2	−13.9
Conservative hold		Swing		

Witney West
Party	Candidate	Votes	%	±%
Conservative	Louise Chapman	513	61.0	−7.1
Labour	Ray Harris	207	24.6	+4.4
Green	Andy King	121	14.4	+2.7
Majority		306	36.4	−11.4
Turnout		841	26.2	−14.4
Conservative hold		Swing		

Woodstock and Bladon
Party	Candidate	Votes	%	±%
Liberal Democrats	Elizabeth Poskitt	647	52.6	−1.2
Conservative	Ian Hudspeth	582	47.4	+1.2
Majority		65	5.3	−2.2
Turnout		1,229	38.3	−36.7
Liberal Democrats gain from Conservative		Swing		

== By-elections between 2012 and 2014 ==
=== Carterton South ===
A by-election was held in Carterton South on 2 May 2013 after the resignation of Conservative councillor Joe Walcott. The seat was held for the Conservatives by Lynn Little with a majority of 369 votes over Labour candidate Dave Wesson.

Carterton South by-election 2 May 2013
Party	Candidate	Votes	%	±%
Conservative	Lynn Little	477	67.5	−1.8
Labour	Dave Wesson	108	15.3	+5.3
Green	Alma Tumilowicz	78	11.0	+4.6
Liberal Democrats	Amanda Epps	44	6.2	−8.1
Majority		369	52.2	−2.8
Turnout		707	23.9	−17.0
Conservative hold		Swing		

=== Witney East ===
A by-election was held in Witney East on 2 May 2013 after the resignation of Conservative councillor Sian Davies. The seat was held for the Conservatives by Jeanette Baker with a majority of 152 votes over Labour candidate Alfred Fullah.

Witney East by-election 2 May 2013
Party	Candidate	Votes	%	±%
Conservative	Jeanette Baker	794	46.5	+0.7
Labour	Alfred Fullah	642	37.6	−16.6
Green	Kate Griffin	270	15.8	+15.8
Majority		152	8.9	
Turnout		1,706	29.4	−1.9
Conservative hold		Swing		

=== Chipping Norton ===
A by-election was held in Chipping Norton on 7 November 2013 after the death of Labour councillor Rob Evans. The seat was held for Labour by Geoff Saul with a majority of 310 votes over Conservative candidate Joe Johnson.

Chipping Norton by-election 7 November 2013
Party	Candidate	Votes	%	±%
Labour	Geoff Saul	810	57.0	−3.0
Conservative	Joe Johnson	500	35.2	−4.8
Green	Matthew Clayton	58	4.1	+4.1
Liberal Democrats	Andrew Crick	53	3.7	+3.7
Majority		310	21.8	+1.8
Turnout		1,421	29.1	−5.4
Labour hold		Swing		
