= 2016 West Oxfordshire District Council election =

2016 UK local government election

2016 local election results in West Oxfordshire

The 2016 West Oxfordshire District Council election was held on 5 May 2016 to elect members of West Oxfordshire District Council in England. This was on the same day as other local elections.

Elections were held for 17 of the 49 seats on the council. No seats changed hands. The Conservative Party held 12 seats, the Labour Party held three seats and the Liberal Democrats held two seats. The Conservatives remained in overall control of the council with a total of 41 seats. The Labour Party and Liberal Democrats remained in opposition with four seats each.

== Ward results ==
=== Chadlington and Churchill ===
Chadlington and Churchill 2016
Party	Candidate	Votes	%	±%
Conservative	Terence Neil Owen	421		
Green	Celia Jocelyn Kerslake	84		
Labour	Aaron James Michael Miles	66		
Liberal Democrats	Ivan Aguado Melet	70		
Turnout			41.18%	
Majority		351		
Conservative hold		Swing		

=== Charlbury and Finstock ===
Charlbury and Finstock 2016
Party	Candidate	Votes	%	±%
Conservative	Paul John Honey	318		
Green	Harriet Lorna Mary Kopinska	76		
Labour	Ruth Helen Smith	77		
Liberal Democrats	Liz Leffman	944		
UKIP	Stephen Howell Nash	31		
Turnout			48.17%	
Majority		626		
Liberal Democrats hold		Swing		

=== Chipping Norton ===
Chipping Norton 2016
Party	Candidate	Votes	%	±%
Conservative	Clare Percival	856		
Green	Paulo Von Zschock	59		
Labour	Geoff Saul	1008		
Liberal Democrats	Chris Tatton	58		
UKIP	Neil David Cartwright	109		
Turnout			43.56%	
Majority		152		
Labour hold		Swing		

=== Eynsham and Cassington ===
Eynsham and Cassington 2016
Party	Candidate	Votes	%	±%
Conservative	Edward Humfrey James	688		
Green	Nicholas Goodwin	248		
Labour	Elsa Louise Dawson	494		
Liberal Democrats	William Harry Griffiths	358		
Turnout			37.47%	
Majority		194		
Conservative hold		Swing		

=== Freeland and Hanborough ===
Freeland and Hanborough 2016
Party	Candidate	Votes	%	±%
Conservative	Carol Elizabeth Reynolds	613		
Green	Alex Simon Friend	158		
Labour	Sian Priscilla Florence O’Neill	158		
Liberal Democrats	Mike Baggaley	225		
UKIP	Barclay Ronald Lawrence	143		
Turnout			37.75%	
Majority		388		
Conservative hold		Swing		

=== Hailey, Minster Lovell and Leafield ===
Hailey, Minster Lovell and Leafield 2016
Party	Candidate	Votes	%	±%
Conservative	Warwick David Robinson	450		
Green	Andy Wright	71		
Independent	Graham Albert Lawrence Knaggs	399		
Labour	Aaron Marc Bennett	123		
Liberal Democrats	Christopher John Blount	151		
Turnout			37.85%	
Majority		299		
Conservative hold		Swing		

=== Kingham, Rollright and Enstone ===
Kingham, Rollright and Enstone 2016
Party	Candidate	Votes	%	±%
Conservative	Nigel George Colston	677		
Green	David James Chanter	102		
Labour	Moira Christine Swann	185		
Liberal Democrats	Glena Elizabeth Edna Chadwick	95		
UKIP	Jim Stanley	137		
Turnout			37.87%	
Majority		3179		
Conservative hold		Swing		

=== Milton-Under-Wychwood ===
Milton-Under-Wychwood 2016
Party	Candidate	Votes	%	±%
Conservative	Jeffrey Haine	477		
Green	Rosanna Pearson	48		
Labour	Andrew Lawrence Ferrero	67		
Liberal Democrats	Matthew Gordon-Banks	106		
Turnout			41.72%	
Majority		371		
Conservative hold		Swing		

=== North Leigh ===
North Leigh 2016
Party	Candidate	Votes	%	±%
Conservative	Harry St John	430		
Green	Stuart Sutherland MacDonald	69		
Labour	Judith Frances Wardle	143		
Liberal Democrats	Gillian Elizabeth Workman	28		
Turnout			43.84%	
Majority		287		
Conservative hold		Swing		

=== Standlake, Aston and Stanton Harcourt ===
Standlake, Aston and Stanton Harcourt 2016
Party	Candidate	Votes	%	±%
Conservative	Elizabeth Hilary Northcote Fenton	670		
Green	Alma Ann Tumilowicz	91		
Labour	Dave Wesson	134		
Liberal Democrats	Andrew Edward Crick	122		
UKIP	Kenneth Robert Clark	176		
Turnout			35.95%	
Majority		494		
Conservative hold		Swing		

=== Stonesfield and Tackley ===
Stonesfield and Tackley 2016
Party	Candidate	Votes	%	±%
Conservative	Richard John Michael Bishop	675		
Green	Maurice Fantato	128		
Labour	David John Baldwin	277		
Liberal Democrats	Mark Mann	141		
Turnout			38.58%	
Majority		398		
Conservative hold		Swing		

=== Witney Central ===
Witney Central 2016
Party	Candidate	Votes	%	±%
Conservative	Chris Holliday	422		
Labour	Andrew Stanley Coles	781		
Liberal Democrats	Edward Mortimer	66		
Turnout			32.89%	
Majority		359		
Labour hold		Swing		

=== Witney East ===
Witney East 2016
Party	Candidate	Votes	%	±%
Conservative	Suzanne Elizabeth Bartington	919		
Green	Nick Owen	106		
Labour	Duncan Shaw Thomas Enright	997		
Liberal Democrats	Carl Martin Rylett	55		
Turnout			35.92%	
Majority		78		
Labour hold		Swing		

=== Witney North ===
Witney North 2016
Party	Candidate	Votes	%	±%
Conservative	Toby Jacob Morris	442		
Green	Brigitte Anne Hickman	201		
Labour	Trevor Ian License	222		
Liberal Democrats	Diane West	158		
Turnout			32.48%	
Majority		200		
Conservative hold		Swing		

=== Witney South ===
Witney South 2016
Party	Candidate	Votes	%	±%
Conservative	Jane Michelle Doughty	673		
Green	Rhys Emmanuel John Danino	125		
Labour	Stephen Parkinson	456		
Liberal Democrats	Kate Southey	116		
Turnout			29.07%	
Majority		217		
Conservative hold		Swing		

=== Witney West ===
Witney West 2016
Party	Candidate	Votes	%	±%
Conservative	Louise Jane Chapman	524		
Green	Andy King	83		
Labour	Calvert Charles Stuart McGibbon	224		
Liberal Democrats	Emma De Launey Tatton	48		
Turnout			27.96%	
Majority		300		
Conservative hold		Swing		

=== Woodstock and Bladon ===
Woodstock and Bladon 2016
Party	Candidate	Votes	%	±%
Conservative	Jill Rosemary Dunsmore	600		
Green	Paul Dominic Creighton	93		
Labour	Christopher Charles Johnson	132		
Liberal Democrats	Elizabeth Margaret Embree Poskitt	617		
Turnout			44.96%	
Majority		17		
Liberal Democrats hold		Swing		

== By-elections between 2016 and 2018 ==
=== Hailey, Minster Lovell and Leafield by-election ===
Hailey, Minster Lovell and Leafield by-election 9 March 2017
Party	Candidate	Votes	%	±%
Liberal Democrats	Kieran Mullins	567	46.7	+34.1
Conservative	Brendan Kay	504	41.5	+3.8
Labour	Calvert McGibbon	71	5.8	−4.5
Green	Andrew Wright	38	3.1	−2.8
UKIP	Jim Stanley	35	2.9	+2.9
Majority		63	5.2	
Turnout		1,215		
Liberal Democrats gain from Conservative		Swing		

=== The Bartons by-election ===
The Bartons by-election 4 May 2017
Party	Candidate	Votes	%	±%
Conservative	Charles Virgin	431	68.4	+6.5
Liberal Democrats	Mark Mann	145	23.0	+7.4
Labour	Dave Baldwin	54	8.6	+8.6
Majority		286	45.4	
Turnout		630		
Conservative hold		Swing		

=== Carterton South by-election ===
Carterton South by-election 15 February 2018
Party	Candidate	Votes	%	±%
Conservative	Michele Mead	388	62.9	+1.4
Liberal Democrats	Ben Lines	146	23.7	+17.7
Labour	Simon Adderley	83	13.5	+2.0
Majority		242	39.2	
Turnout		617		
Conservative hold		Swing		
