= 2004 West Oxfordshire District Council election =

2004 UK local government election

Map of the results of the 2004 West Oxfordshire District Council election. Conservatives in blue, Liberal Democrats in yellow and independent in light grey. Wards in dark grey were not contested in 2004.

The 2004 West Oxfordshire District Council election took place on 10 June 2004 to elect members of West Oxfordshire District Council in Oxfordshire, England. One third of the council was up for election and the Conservative Party stayed in overall control of the council.

After the election, the composition of the council was:

- Conservative 29
- Liberal Democrats 13
- Independent 6
- Labour 1

== Background ==
After the last election in 2003 the Conservatives controlled the council with 29 seats, while the Liberal Democrats had 12, there were six Independent councillors and the Labour Party had two seats. A total of 54 candidates stood for the 17 seats up for election in 2004, comprising 16 each for the Conservatives and Liberal Democrats, 11 Labour candidates, nine Green Party and two Independents.

== Election result ==
The Conservatives remained in control of the council with 29 councillors, after winning 12 of the 17 seats contested. 13 of the 14 councillors who were standing again were re-elected, with only Conservative councillor James Mills losing his seat in Standlake, Aston and Stanton Harcourt ward to Liberal Democrat Elisabeth Bickley. The Liberal Democrats took four seats and therefore finished with 13 councillors on the council., while all three members of the Conservative council cabinet were re-elected, including the council leader Barry Norton in North Leigh ward.

Conservative Andrew Creery also gained one seat in Witney Central from Labour, after the Labour councillor for the previous 30 years, Ted Cooper, stood down at the election. This reduced Labour to its worst ever position on the council with just one councillor. Meanwhile, independent councillor Derrick Millard retained his seat in Stonesfield and Tackley, to mean there remained six independent councillors. Overall turnout at the election was 45.19%.

West Oxfordshire local election result 2004
| Party | Seats | Gains | Losses | Net gain/loss | Seats % | Votes % | Votes | +/− |
|---|---|---|---|---|---|---|---|---|
| Conservative | 12 | 1 | 1 | 0 | 70.6 | 46.5 | 10,996 | +7.9% |
| Liberal Democrats | 4 | 1 | 0 | +1 | 23.5 | 30.4 | 7,180 | -0.1% |
| Independent | 1 | 0 | 0 | 0 | 5.9 | 5.8 | 1,360 | -8.2% |
| Labour | 0 | 0 | 1 | -1 | 0 | 10.2 | 2,419 | -1.0% |
| Green | 0 | 0 | 0 | 0 | 0 | 7.1 | 1,686 | +2.3% |

== Ward results ==
Chadlington and Churchill
| Party | Candidate | Votes | % | ±% |
|---|---|---|---|---|
| Conservative | Terence Owen | 499 | 66.0 | +0.5 |
| Liberal Democrats | Elizabeth Leffman | 152 | 20.1 | −14.4 |
| Labour | Georgina Burrows | 105 | 13.9 | +13.9 |
| Majority | | 347 | 45.9 | +15.0 |
| Turnout | | 756 | 49.9 | +9.9 |
| Conservative hold | | Swing | | |

Charlbury and Finstock
| Party | Candidate | Votes | % | ±% |
|---|---|---|---|---|
| Liberal Democrats | Glena Chadwick | 985 | 66.7 | +4.5 |
| Conservative | Ian Lyne | 491 | 33.3 | +33.3 |
| Majority | | 494 | 33.5 | +3.9 |
| Turnout | | 1,476 | 50.9 | +9.7 |
| Liberal Democrats hold | | Swing | | |

Chipping Norton
| Party | Candidate | Votes | % | ±% |
|---|---|---|---|---|
| Conservative | Michael Howes | 964 | 49.0 | +9.5 |
| Labour | Mark Walker | 478 | 24.3 | −22.3 |
| Liberal Democrats | Elizabeth Allen | 363 | 18.4 | +4.4 |
| Green | Rachel Griffiths | 163 | 8.3 | +8.3 |
| Majority | | 486 | 24.7 | |
| Turnout | | 1,968 | 44.1 | +8.2 |
| Conservative hold | | Swing | | |

Eynsham and Cassington
| Party | Candidate | Votes | % | ±% |
|---|---|---|---|---|
| Liberal Democrats | Margaret Stevens | 1,045 | 54.8 | −3.0 |
| Conservative | Frances Pike | 662 | 34.7 | +0.4 |
| Green | Xanthe Bevis | 201 | 10.5 | +2.6 |
| Majority | | 383 | 20.1 | −3.3 |
| Turnout | | 1,908 | 43.0 | +10.5 |
| Liberal Democrats hold | | Swing | | |

Freeland and Hanborough
| Party | Candidate | Votes | % | ±% |
|---|---|---|---|---|
| Liberal Democrats | Stuart Brooks | 935 | 55.9 | |
| Conservative | Jill Dunsmore | 737 | 44.1 | |
| Majority | | 198 | 11.8 | |
| Turnout | | 1,672 | 52.1 | +6.0 |
| Liberal Democrats hold | | Swing | | |

Hailey, Minster Lovell and Leafield
| Party | Candidate | Votes | % | ±% |
|---|---|---|---|---|
| Conservative | Simon Hoare | 942 | 68.3 | +3.3 |
| Liberal Democrats | Malcolm West | 306 | 22.2 | −12.8 |
| Labour | William Tumbridge | 131 | 9.5 | +9.5 |
| Majority | | 636 | 46.1 | +16.0 |
| Turnout | | 1,379 | 44.9 | +8.6 |
| Conservative hold | | Swing | | |

Kingham, Rollright and Enstone
| Party | Candidate | Votes | % | ±% |
|---|---|---|---|---|
| Conservative | Anthony Walker | 899 | 62.1 | +1.2 |
| Liberal Democrats | Christopher Tatton | 286 | 19.8 | −0.2 |
| Labour | Melanie Deans | 262 | 18.1 | −0.9 |
| Majority | | 613 | 42.4 | +1.5 |
| Turnout | | 1,447 | 46.0 | +11.3 |
| Conservative hold | | Swing | | |

Milton under Wychwood
| Party | Candidate | Votes | % | ±% |
|---|---|---|---|---|
| Conservative | Jeffrey Haine | 571 | 74.2 | −2.2 |
| Liberal Democrats | John Lilly | 199 | 25.8 | +2.2 |
| Majority | | 372 | 48.3 | −4.5 |
| Turnout | | 770 | 49.2 | +5.4 |
| Conservative hold | | Swing | | |

North Leigh
| Party | Candidate | Votes | % | ±% |
|---|---|---|---|---|
| Conservative | Barry Norton | 513 | 60.2 | |
| Liberal Democrats | Philip Workman | 200 | 23.5 | |
| Labour | Helen Bridge | 139 | 16.3 | |
| Majority | | 313 | 36.7 | |
| Turnout | | 852 | 56.3 | |
| Conservative hold | | Swing | | |

Standlake, Aston and Stanton Harcourt
| Party | Candidate | Votes | % | ±% |
|---|---|---|---|---|
| Liberal Democrats | Elisabeth Bickley | 831 | 51.7 | |
| Conservative | James Mills | 775 | 48.3 | |
| Majority | | 56 | 3.4 | N/A |
| Turnout | | 1,606 | 52.1 | +9.0 |
| Liberal Democrats gain from Conservative | | Swing | | |

Stonesfield and Tackley
| Party | Candidate | Votes | % | ±% |
|---|---|---|---|---|
| Independent | Derrick Millard | 1,060 | 69.3 | −0.6 |
| Liberal Democrats | Gillian Workman | 249 | 16.3 | −0.2 |
| Green | Susan Turnbull | 220 | 14.4 | +0.8 |
| Majority | | 811 | 53.0 | −0.5 |
| Turnout | | 1,529 | 48.8 | +12.8 |
| Independent hold | | Swing | | |

Witney Central
| Party | Candidate | Votes | % | ±% |
|---|---|---|---|---|
| Conservative | Andrew Creery | 524 | 42.9 | +14.2 |
| Labour | Richard Kelsall | 339 | 27.7 | +2.8 |
| Liberal Democrats | June Taylor | 217 | 17.8 | +4.6 |
| Green | Sandra Simpson | 142 | 11.6 | +8.4 |
| Majority | | 185 | 15.2 | N/A |
| Turnout | | 1,222 | 41.1 | +1.7 |
| Conservative gain from Labour | | Swing | | |

Witney East
| Party | Candidate | Votes | % | ±% |
|---|---|---|---|---|
| Conservative | Frank Smith | 710 | 49.4 | +16.8 |
| Liberal Democrats | Peter Madden | 341 | 23.7 | −27.2 |
| Green | Enid Dossett-Davies | 218 | 15.2 | +9.3 |
| Labour | Raymond Harris | 169 | 11.8 | +1.3 |
| Majority | | 369 | 25.7 | |
| Turnout | | 1,438 | 38.3 | +6.8 |
| Conservative hold | | Swing | | |

Witney North
| Party | Candidate | Votes | % | ±% |
|---|---|---|---|---|
| Conservative | Martin Chapman | 569 | 45.2 | +6.7 |
| Green | Richard Dossett-Davies | 324 | 25.7 | +5.9 |
| Liberal Democrats | Paul Slamin | 239 | 19.0 | −22.7 |
| Labour | Diana Kelsall | 128 | 10.2 | +10.2 |
| Majority | | 245 | 19.5 | |
| Turnout | | 1,260 | 41.1 | +6.4 |
| Conservative hold | | Swing | | |

Witney South
| Party | Candidate | Votes | % | ±% |
|---|---|---|---|---|
| Conservative | Peter Green | 863 | 52.7 | +21.7 |
| Labour | Phillip Edney | 317 | 19.3 | +2.3 |
| Liberal Democrats | Olive Minett | 282 | 17.2 | +6.6 |
| Green | Jill Jones | 177 | 10.8 | +5.8 |
| Majority | | 546 | 33.3 | +27.7 |
| Turnout | | 1,639 | 36.3 | +6.8 |
| Conservative hold | | Swing | | |

Witney West
| Party | Candidate | Votes | % | ±% |
|---|---|---|---|---|
| Conservative | Louise Chapman | 574 | 51.3 | +9.5 |
| Independent | Ian Lucas | 300 | 26.8 | +1.9 |
| Labour | David Wesson | 142 | 12.7 | −1.6 |
| Green | Christopher Marchant | 102 | 9.1 | +2.8 |
| Majority | | 274 | 24.5 | +7.6 |
| Turnout | | 1,118 | 37.0 | +13.0 |
| Conservative hold | | Swing | | |

Woodstock and Bladon
| Party | Candidate | Votes | % | ±% |
|---|---|---|---|---|
| Conservative | Ian Hudspeth | 703 | 43.9 | |
| Liberal Democrats | Elizabeth Poskitt | 550 | 34.4 | |
| Labour | Susan Roberts | 209 | 13.1 | |
| Green | Tracy Dighton-Brown | 139 | 8.7 | |
| Majority | | 153 | 9.5 | |
| Turnout | | 1,601 | 53.7 | +5.8 |
| Conservative hold | | Swing | | |

== By-elections between 2004 and 2006 ==
Witney East by-election 7 July 2005
| Party | Candidate | Votes | % | ±% |
|---|---|---|---|---|
| Conservative | Roger Curry | 420 | 50.5 | +1.1 |
| Liberal Democrats | Daniel Coulson | 253 | 30.4 | +6.7 |
| Green | Enid Dossett-Davies | 109 | 13.1 | −2.1 |
| Labour | David Wesson | 49 | 5.9 | −5.9 |
| Majority | | 167 | 20.1 | −5.6 |
| Turnout | | 831 | 19.8 | −18.5 |
| Conservative hold | | Swing | | |
