= 2000 West Oxfordshire District Council election =

2000 UK local government election

The 2000 West Oxfordshire District Council election took place on 4 May 2000 to elect members of West Oxfordshire District Council in Oxfordshire, England. One third of the council was up for election and the Conservative Party gained overall control of the council from no overall control.

After the election, the composition of the council was:

- Conservative 26
- Liberal Democrats 13
- Independent 8
- Labour 2

== Election result ==
The Conservatives gained a majority on the council for the first time in 11 years with 26 councillors, after taking 47% of the vote and 11 of the 17 seats contested. The Conservative gains included taking seats from Labour in Chipping Norton and Witney West, as well as Minster Lovell from an independent, while the Conservative group leader Barry Norton was easily re-elected in North Leigh.

The Conservative gains came mostly at the expense of the Labour Party, who with 20% of the vote lost five seats to be left with only two councillors. Meanwhile, the Liberal Democrats remained with 13 councillors after taking 21% of the vote.

West Oxfordshire local election result 2000
Party	Seats	Gains	Losses	Net gain/loss	Seats %	Votes %	Votes	+/−
Conservative	11			+7	64.7	46.9	7,577	+8.5
Liberal Democrats	3			0	17.6	20.9	3,381	-6.7
Independent	3			-2	17.6	11.6	1,875	-3.9
Labour	0			-5	0.0	20.1	3,254	+2.3
Green	0			0	0.0	0.4	69	-0.3

== Ward results ==
Carterton North
Party	Candidate	Votes	%	±%
Conservative	Keith Stone	819	72.0	+17.6
Labour	John Rowe	318	28.0	−2.9
Majority		501	44.1	+20.6
Turnout		1,137	24.0	+3.0

Carterton South
Party	Candidate	Votes	%	±%
Conservative	Harry Watts	505	56.6	−16.4
Liberal Democrats	Peter Madden	327	36.7	+9.7
Labour	William Tumbridge	60	6.7	+6.7
Majority		178	20.0	−26.0
Turnout		892	29.2	+0.4
Conservative hold		Swing		

Charlbury
Party	Candidate	Votes	%	±%
Liberal Democrats	Glena Chadwick	528	42.9	−17.3
Independent	Robert Potter	294	23.9	+23.9
Conservative	Jacqueline Windsor-Lewis	209	17.0	−0.6
Labour	Alison Bettle	200	16.2	−5.9
Majority		234	19.0	−19.1
Turnout		1,231	52.3	+2.6

Chipping Norton
Party	Candidate	Votes	%	±%
Conservative	Michael Howes	850	54.8	+54.8
Labour	Georgina Burrows	546	35.2	+2.7
Liberal Democrats	Derek Brown	156	10.1	+5.0
Majority		304	19.6	
Turnout		1,552	34.1	+3.9
Conservative gain from Labour		Swing		

Eynsham
Party	Candidate	Votes	%	±%
Liberal Democrats	Margaret Stevens	603	55.1	−16.4
Conservative	Peter Green	272	24.9	+3.9
Labour	Michael Shelton	150	13.7	+13.7
Green	Mark Stevenson	69	6.3	−1.2
Majority		331	30.3	−20.3
Turnout		1,094	29.7	+0.2
Liberal Democrats hold		Swing		

Freeland and Hanborough
Party	Candidate	Votes	%	±%
Liberal Democrats	Gareth Epps	667	49.1	+5.7
Conservative	David Dawes	597	43.9	+0.9
Labour	Gwilym Mason	95	7.0	−6.6
Majority		70	5.2	+4.8
Turnout		1,359	41.8	+4.3
Liberal Democrats hold		Swing		

Kingham
Party	Candidate	Votes	%	±%
Conservative	Maria Drinkwater	429	80.8	
Labour	Matthew Deans	61	11.5	
Liberal Democrats	Malcolm West	41	7.7	
Majority		368	69.3	
Turnout		531	41.5	
Conservative hold		Swing		

Milton-under-Wychwood
Party	Candidate	Votes	%	±%
Conservative	Jeffrey Haine	474	66.3	
Liberal Democrats	Keith Baker	175	24.5	
Labour	Frances Ashworth	66	9.2	
Majority		299	41.8	
Turnout		715	44.9	
Conservative hold		Swing		

Minster Lovell
Party	Candidate	Votes	%	±%
Conservative	Warwick Robinson	276	48.4	
Independent	Francis Smith	238	41.8	
Labour	Sheila Cuss	56	9.8	
Majority		38	6.6	
Turnout		570	42.5	
Conservative gain from Independent		Swing		

North Leigh
Party	Candidate	Votes	%	±%
Conservative	Barry Norton	536	73.3	
Labour	Helen Bridge	130	17.8	
Liberal Democrats	Edward Williams	65	8.9	
Majority		406	55.5	
Turnout		731	47.9	
Conservative hold		Swing		

Rollright
Party	Candidate	Votes	%	±%
Conservative	Anthony Walker	319	75.1	
Labour	Melanie Deans	106	24.9	
Majority		213	50.2	
Turnout		425	37.1	
Conservative hold		Swing		

Stanton Harcourt
Party	Candidate	Votes	%	±%
Independent	John Faulkner	411	75.4	
Labour	Andrew Ross	134	24.6	
Majority		277	50.8	
Turnout		545	41.7	
Independent hold		Swing		

Tackley and Wootton
Party	Candidate	Votes	%	±%
Independent	Charles Cottrell-Dormer	340	51.8	
Conservative	Lynda Collingwood	132	20.1	
Labour	Michael Enright	109	16.6	
Liberal Democrats	Phyllis Epps	76	11.6	
Majority		208	31.7	
Turnout		657	47.8	
Independent hold		Swing		

Witney East
Party	Candidate	Votes	%	±%
Conservative	Martin Chapman	556	44.3	+2.6
Liberal Democrats	Serena Martin	446	35.6	−22.7
Labour	Ross Beadle	252	20.1	+20.1
Majority		110	8.7	
Turnout		1,254	32.2	+0.2

Witney South
Party	Candidate	Votes	%	±%
Conservative	Lesley Semaine	817	56.7	+8.4
Labour	Richard Kelsall	430	29.8	−7.3
Liberal Democrats	Olive Minett	194	13.5	−1.1
Majority		387	26.9	+15.7
Turnout		1,441	27.3	+2.7
Conservative gain from Labour		Swing		

Witney West
Party	Candidate	Votes	%	±%
Conservative	Andrew Creery	518	51.7	+7.9
Labour	Paul Langley	381	38.0	−8.4
Liberal Democrats	June Taylor	103	10.3	+0.5
Majority		137	13.7	
Turnout		1,002	32.4	+1.9
Conservative gain from Labour		Swing		

Woodstock
Party	Candidate	Votes	%	±%
Independent	Ann Cooper	592	58.0	+58.0
Conservative	Sandra Rasch	268	26.3	+4.5
Labour	Duncan Enright	160	15.7	−12.9
Majority		324	31.7	
Turnout		1,020	41.7	−8.0
Independent hold		Swing		
