= 2011 West Oxfordshire District Council election =

2011 UK local government election

Map of the results of the 2011 West Oxfordshire District Council election. Conservatives in blue and Labour in red. Wards in dark grey were not contested in 2011.

The 2011 West Oxfordshire District Council election took place on 5 May 2011 to elect members of West Oxfordshire District Council in Oxfordshire, England. One third of the council was up for election and the Conservative Party stayed in overall control of the council.

After the election, the composition of the council was:

- Conservative 44
- Liberal Democrats 4
- Labour 1

== Background ==
After the 2010 West Oxfordshire District Council election the Conservatives controlled the council with 40 councillors, compared to seven for the Liberal Democrats and one each for Labour and an Independent. 16 seats were contested in 2011, with three Conservative cabinet members, Mark Booty, Richard Langridge and Warwick Robinson, defending seats, as well as the Liberal Democrat group leader Richard Andrews.

A total of 55 candidates stood for election, with 19 for the five seats in Witney alone. Both the Conservatives and the Green Party put up a full slate of 16 candidates, while Labour had 11 candidates, the Liberal Democrats 10 and there were two independents.

== Election result ==
The Conservatives increased their control of the council, gaining four seats to have 44 councillors. Three of the Conservative gains came at the expense of the Liberal Democrats who dropped to four seats on the council, with the Liberal Democrat group leader Richard Andrews in Eynsham and Cassington being one of those who were defeated at the election. The other Liberal Democrat defeats came in Carterton South were Peter Madden lost his seat to Conservative Michael Brennan and in Charlbury and Finstock, where Michael Breakell had stepped down as a councillor at the election.

The fourth Conservative gain came in Stonesfield and Tackley where Charles Cottrell-Dormer won the seat as a Conservative, after having previously represented the ward as an independent. Meanwhile, Labour remained with one seat after Eve Coles held Chipping Norton for the party and Duncan Enright came second in Witney East with 1,006 votes, compared to 1,131 for Conservative Sian Davies. Overall 11 of the 13 sitting councillors who stood again were re-elected and average turnout at the election was 45.9%.

West Oxfordshire local election result 2011
Party	Seats	Gains	Losses	Net gain/loss	Seats %	Votes %	Votes	+/−
Conservative	15	4	0	+4	93.8	55.0	14,365	-4.1%
Labour	1	0	0	0	6.3	17.4	4,532	+7.1%
Green	0	0	0	0	0	13.4	3,499	+10.6%
Liberal Democrats	0	0	3	-3	0	11.0	2,880	-15.6%
Independent	0	0	1	-1	0	3.2	843	+2.0%

== Ward results ==
Alvescot and Filkins
Party	Candidate	Votes	%	±%
Conservative	Ross McFarlane	565	73.9	
Green	Alma Tumilowicz	200	26.1	
Majority		365	47.8	
Turnout		765	52.9	
Conservative hold		Swing		

Bampton and Clanfield
Party	Candidate	Votes	%	±%
Conservative	Mark Booty	1,053	71.8	−4.2
Green	Maurice Fantato	413	28.2	+28.2
Majority		640	43.7	−8.2
Turnout		1,466	51.1	−24.4
Conservative hold		Swing		

Carterton North East
Party	Candidate	Votes	%	±%
Conservative	Norman MacRae	799	66.6	−0.1
Liberal Democrats	Jonathan Biggs	226	18.8	−14.5
Green	Fredrick Cousins	174	14.5	+14.5
Majority		573	47.8	+14.3
Turnout		1,199	32.0	−32.2
Conservative hold		Swing		

Carterton North West
Party	Candidate	Votes	%	±%
Conservative	Peter Handley	928	72.6	+2.3
Green	Rosanna Taylor	351	27.4	+13.2
Majority		577	45.1	−9.7
Turnout		1,279	40.9	−30.1
Conservative hold		Swing		

Carterton South
Party	Candidate	Votes	%	±%
Conservative	Michael Brennan	893	69.3	−8.7
Liberal Democrats	Peter Madden	184	14.3	−7.7
Labour	William Tumbridge	129	10.0	+10.0
Green	John-Patrick Stacey	83	6.4	+6.4
Majority		709	55.0	−0.9
Turnout		1,289	40.9	−27.4
Conservative gain from Liberal Democrats		Swing		

Charlbury and Finstock
Party	Candidate	Votes	%	±%
Conservative	Hywel Davies	716	40.8	−1.2
Liberal Democrats	Elizabeth Leffman	677	38.5	−19.5
Labour	Lesley Algar	199	11.3	+11.3
Green	Celia Kerslake	165	9.4	+9.4
Majority		39	2.3	
Turnout		1,757	59.3	+7.7
Conservative gain from Liberal Democrats		Swing		

Chipping Norton
Party	Candidate	Votes	%	±%
Labour	Evelyn Coles	881	36.6	−2.8
Conservative	David Lydiat	833	34.7	−12.6
Independent	Susan Bartholomew	537	22.3	+22.3
Green	Catherine Hickman	94	3.9	+3.9
Liberal Democrats	Amanda Epps	59	2.5	−10.7
Majority		48	1.9	
Turnout		2,404	52.0	−19.5
Labour hold		Swing		

Eynsham and Cassington
Party	Candidate	Votes	%	±%
Conservative	Peter Kelland	872	37.9	−5.4
Liberal Democrats	Richard Andrews	831	36.1	−20.6
Labour	Merilyn Davies	399	17.4	+17.4
Green	Susan MacDonald	197	8.6	+8.6
Majority		41	1.8	
Turnout		2,299	50.6	−24.8
Conservative gain from Liberal Democrats		Swing		

Hailey, Minster Lovell and Leafield
Party	Candidate	Votes	%	±%
Conservative	Warwick Robinson	1,009	66.6	
Labour	Frances Ashworth	197	13.0	
Green	Andrew Wright	160	10.6	
Liberal Democrats	Gillian Workman	149	9.8	
Majority		812	53.6	
Turnout		1,515	49.5	
Conservative hold		Swing		

Kingham, Rollright and Enstone
Party	Candidate	Votes	%	±%
Conservative	Andrew Beaney	1,088	68.7	
Labour	Charles Watson	279	17.6	
Green	Kevin Hickman	217	13.7	
Majority		809	51.1	
Turnout		1,584	51.0	
Conservative hold		Swing		

Stonesfield and Tackley
Party	Candidate	Votes	%	±%
Conservative	Charles Cottrell-Dormer	1,077	61.2	−8.3
Green	Susan Turnbull	423	24.0	−6.5
Liberal Democrats	Michael Baggaley	259	14.7	+14.7
Majority		654	37.2	−1.7
Turnout		1,759	56.0	+15.2
Conservative gain from Independent		Swing		

Witney Central
Party	Candidate	Votes	%	±%
Conservative	Peter Dorward	813	51.1	−11.7
Labour	Andrew Coles	572	36.0	+13.7
Green	Jonathan Strode	205	12.9	+4.9
Majority		241	15.2	−25.3
Turnout		1,590	41.4	+8.3
Conservative hold		Swing		

Witney East
Party	Candidate	Votes	%	±%
Conservative	Sian Davies	1,131	44.6	−10.9
Labour	Duncan Enright	1,006	39.6	+20.8
Green	Kate Griffin	241	9.5	+2.6
Liberal Democrats	Rose Beadle	160	6.3	−12.5
Majority		125	4.9	−31.8
Turnout		2,538	44.4	−26.1
Conservative hold		Swing		

Witney North
Party	Candidate	Votes	%	±%
Conservative	Richard Langridge	798	53.8	−0.3
Green	Brigitte Hickman	261	17.6	−11.0
Labour	Alfred Fullah	214	14.4	+14.4
Liberal Democrats	Ruth Smith	210	14.2	−3.0
Majority		537	36.2	+10.7
Turnout		1,483	47.5	+12.4
Conservative hold		Swing		

Witney South
Party	Candidate	Votes	%	±%
Conservative	Alvin Adams	922	48.1	−7.3
Labour	Michael Enright	398	20.8	+3.5
Independent	James Robertshaw	306	16.0	+16.0
Green	Andrew King	166	8.7	−1.2
Liberal Democrats	Olive Minett	125	6.5	−10.9
Majority		524	27.3	−10.7
Turnout		1,917	41.1	−26.5
Conservative hold		Swing		

Witney West
Party	Candidate	Votes	%	±%
Conservative	Harry Eaglestone	868	68.1	−7.2
Labour	David Wesson	258	20.2	+5.6
Green	Paul Creighton	149	11.7	+1.7
Majority		610	47.8	−12.9
Turnout		1,275	40.6	+10.3
Conservative hold		Swing		
