= 2003 West Oxfordshire District Council election =

2003 UK local government election

Map of the results of the 2003 West Oxfordshire District Council election. Conservatives in blue, Liberal Democrats in yellow, independents in light grey and Labour in red. Wards in dark grey were not contested in 2003.

The 2003 West Oxfordshire District Council election took place on 1 May 2003 to elect members of West Oxfordshire District Council in Oxfordshire, England. One third of the council was up for election and the Conservative Party stayed in overall control of the council.

After the election, the composition of the council was:

- Conservative 29
- Liberal Democrats 12
- Independent 6
- Labour 2

== Background ==
Before the election the Conservatives controlled the council with 32 councillors, while the Liberal Democrats had 10 seats, Independents had 5 seats and the Labour Party had 2 seats. 16 seats were contested in 2003, with 13 of the sitting councillors defending their seats.

A total of 53 candidates stood for election, 15 Liberal Democrats, 14 Conservatives, 9 Greens, 8 Labour, 6 independents and 1 UK Independence Party.

== Election result ==
The Conservatives retained control of West Oxfordshire District Council with a reduced majority of nine seats. They won 9 of the 16 seats contested, but lost three seats, two to the Liberal Democrats and one to an Independent candidate. This left the Conservatives with 29 councillors, while the Liberal Democrat gains moved them to 12 seats on the council. In total 11 of the 13 sitting councillors who stood again in 2003 won re-election.

The Independent gain from the Conservatives came in Witney Central, where first time candidate Harriet Ryley was elected after campaigning against the redevelopment of the Marriotts Close area for either a superstore or housing. Meanwhile, Labour kept two seats on the council, after Eve Coles held a seat in Chipping Norton ward for the party, while none of the Green Party candidates were elected. Overall turnout at the election was 32.89%.

West Oxfordshire local election result 2003
Party	Seats	Gains	Losses	Net gain/loss	Seats %	Votes %	Votes	+/−
Conservative	9	0	3	-3	56.3	38.6	6,400	-5.0%
Liberal Democrats	4	2	0	+2	25.0	30.5	5,047	+3.0%
Independent	2	1	0	+1	12.5	14.0	2,320	+1.9%
Labour	1	0	0	0	6.3	11.2	1,860	-2.5%
Green	0	0	0	0	0	4.8	788	+1.9%
UKIP	0	0	0	0	0	0.9	145	+0.7%

== Ward results ==
Alvescot and Filkins
Party	Candidate	Votes	%	±%
Conservative	Angela Neale	384	72.3	+1.3
Liberal Democrats	Anna Fairhurst	107	20.2	−8.8
Green	Xanthe Bevis	40	7.5	+7.5
Majority		277	52.2	+10.2
Turnout		531	39.8	−3.1
Conservative hold		Swing		

Bampton and Clanfield
Party	Candidate	Votes	%	±%
Conservative	Mark Booty	576	53.4	
Liberal Democrats	Nicholas Locke	503	46.6	
Majority		73	6.8	
Turnout		1,079	38.4	+0.6
Conservative hold		Swing		

Carterton North East
Party	Candidate	Votes	%	±%
Conservative	Keith Stone	235	70.6	
Liberal Democrats	Christopher Tatton	98	29.4	
Majority		137	41.2	
Turnout		333	17.4	
Conservative hold		Swing		

Carterton North West
Party	Candidate	Votes	%	±%
Conservative	Peter Handley	458	54.3	
Independent	Paul Wesson	288	34.1	
Labour	William Tumbridge	98	11.6	
Majority		170	20.2	
Turnout		844	26.5	−2.0
Conservative hold		Swing		

Carterton South
Party	Candidate	Votes	%	±%
Conservative	Harry Watts	430	49.4	
Liberal Democrats	Peter Madden	364	41.8	
Labour	Duncan Enright	77	8.8	
Majority		66	7.6	
Turnout		871	28.5	−2.9
Conservative hold		Swing		

Charlbury and Finstock
Party	Candidate	Votes	%	±%
Liberal Democrats	Michael Breakell	735	62.2	
Independent	Robert Potter	386	32.7	
Green	Tracy Dighton-Brown	60	5.1	
Majority		349	29.5	
Turnout		1,181	41.2	−9.6
Liberal Democrats hold		Swing		

Chipping Norton
Party	Candidate	Votes	%	±%
Labour	Evelyn Coles	744	46.6	
Conservative	Carolyn Hazeel	631	39.5	
Liberal Democrats	Katharine Southey	223	14.0	
Majority		113	7.1	
Turnout		1,598	35.9	−2.7
Labour hold		Swing		

Eynsham and Cassington
Party	Candidate	Votes	%	±%
Liberal Democrats	David Rossiter	838	57.8	
Conservative	Frances Pike	498	34.3	
Green	Jill Jones	114	7.9	
Majority		340	23.5	
Turnout		1,450	32.5	−5.2
Liberal Democrats hold		Swing		

Hailey, Minster Lovell and Leafield
Party	Candidate	Votes	%	±%
Conservative	Warwick Robinson	714	65.0	
Liberal Democrats	Malcolm West	384	35.0	
Majority		330	30.0	
Turnout		1,098	36.3	−2.8
Conservative hold		Swing		

Kingham, Rollright and Enstone
Party	Candidate	Votes	%	±%
Conservative	Rodney Rose	660	60.9	
Liberal Democrats	Amanda Epps	217	20.0	
Labour	Georgina Burrows	206	19.0	
Majority		443	40.9	−1.4
Turnout		1,083	34.7	
Conservative hold		Swing		

Stonesfield and Tackley
Party	Candidate	Votes	%	±%
Independent	Charles Cottrell-Dormer	782	69.9	
Liberal Democrats	Elizabeth Leffman	184	16.5	
Green	Susan Turnbull	152	13.6	
Majority		598	53.4	
Turnout		1,118	36.0	−11.4
Independent hold		Swing		

Witney Central
Party	Candidate	Votes	%	±%
Independent	Harriet Ryley	351	30.1	
Conservative	Andrew Creery	335	28.7	
Labour	Richard Kelsall	290	24.9	
Liberal Democrats	Paul Slamin	154	13.2	
Green	Paul Creighton	37	3.2	
Majority		16	1.4	
Turnout		1,167	39.4	−1.7
Independent gain from Conservative		Swing		

Witney East
Party	Candidate	Votes	%	±%
Liberal Democrats	David Nicholson	571	50.9	
Conservative	Robert Barton	366	32.6	
Labour	Mark Albert	118	10.5	
Green	Christopher Marchant	66	5.9	
Majority		205	18.3	
Turnout		1,121	31.5	−1.7
Liberal Democrats gain from Conservative		Swing		

Witney North
Party	Candidate	Votes	%	±%
Liberal Democrats	Serena Martin	439	41.7	
Conservative	Roger Curry	405	38.5	
Green	Richard Dossett-Davies	208	19.8	
Majority		34	3.2	
Turnout		1,052	34.7	+1.3
Liberal Democrats gain from Conservative		Swing		

Witney South
Party	Candidate	Votes	%	±%
Conservative	Ross McFarlane	408	31.0	
Independent	Thomas Titherington	334	25.4	
Labour	Phillip Edney	224	17.0	
UKIP	James Robertshaw	145	11.0	
Liberal Democrats	Olive Minett	139	10.6	
Green	Stephen Mohammad	66	5.0	
Majority		74	5.6	
Turnout		1,316	29.5	−3.1
Conservative hold		Swing		

Witney West
Party	Candidate	Votes	%	±%
Conservative	Alvin Adams	300	41.8	
Independent	Ian Lucas	179	24.9	
Labour	David Wesson	103	14.3	
Liberal Democrats	Geoffrey Branner	91	12.7	
Green	Colette Jones	45	6.3	
Majority		121	16.9	
Turnout		718	24.0	−2.5
Conservative hold		Swing		
