= 2024 West Oxfordshire District Council election =

- 2 May 2024

17 out of 49 seats to West Oxfordshire District Council 25 seats needed for a majority

	First party	Second party	Third party
Leader	Andy Graham	Michelle Mead	Duncan Enright
Party	Liberal Democrats	Conservative	Labour
Last election	18 seats, 28.2%	17 seats, 37.1%	10 seats, 21.0%
Seats before	17	16 (Note: Including one vacant seat last held by Conservative councillor Colin Dingwall prior to his resignation in April 2024.)	11
Seats after	21	13	11
Seat change	▲4	▼3	Steady
Popular vote	7,304	8,258	5,664
Percentage	30.1%	34.0%	23.3%
Swing	▲1.9%	▼3.1%	▲2.3%
	Fourth party	Fifth party
Leader	Rosie Pearson
Party	Green	Independent
Last election	3 seats, 9.1%	1 seat, 9.1%
Seats before	3	2
Seats after	4	0
Seat change	▲1	▼2
Popular vote	2,653	102
Percentage	10.9%	0.4%
Swing	▲1.8%	▼3.7%
- Winner of each seat at the 2024 West Oxfordshire District Council election
Leader before election
Andy Graham
Liberal Democrats
No overall control
Leader after election
Andy Graham
Liberal Democrats
No overall control

The 2024 West Oxfordshire District Council election took place on 2 May 2024 to elect members of West Oxfordshire District Council in Oxfordshire, England. This was on the same day as other local elections.

== Summary ==
Prior to the election, the council was under no overall control, being run by a Liberal Democrat, Labour and Green coalition. The council remained under no overall control after the election and the same coalition continued to form the council's administration.

=== Election result ===
West Oxfordshire Council's composition following the 2024 local elections.

2024 West Oxfordshire District Council election
Party	This election			Full council			This election		
Party	Seats	Net	Seats %	Other	Total	Total %	Votes	Votes %	+/−
Liberal Democrats	9	▲4	47.4	12	21	45.1	7,304	30.1	+1.9
Conservative	4	▼3	21.1	9	13	25.5	8,258	34.0	–3.1
Labour	4	Steady	21.1	7	11	21.6	5,664	23.3	+2.3
Green	2	▲1	10.5	2	4	7.8	2,653	10.9	+1.8
Reform	0	Steady	0.0	0	0	0.0	215	0.9	N/A
Independent	0	▼2	0.0	0	0	0.0	102	0.4	–3.7
Heritage	0	Steady	0.0	0	0	0.0	99	0.4	–0.2

== Ward results ==
The Statement of Persons Nominated, which details the candidates standing in each ward, was released by West Oxfordshire District Council following the close of nominations on 5 April 2024.

=== Chadlington & Churchill ===
Chadlington & Churchill
Party	Candidate	Votes	%	±%
Liberal Democrats	Nigel Ridpath	342	56.3	+23.9
Conservative	Caspar Morris	210	34.6	−10.6
Labour	Chris Tomlin	55	9.1	+0.7
Majority				
Turnout		607		
Registered electors				
Liberal Democrats gain from Conservative		Swing		

=== Charlbury & Finstock ===
Charlbury & Finstock
Party	Candidate	Votes	%	±%
Liberal Democrats	Liz Leffman*	785	58.9	−0.1
Conservative	Gareth Dore	270	20.3	−3.3
Labour	Robin Puttick	153	11.5	+1.6
Green	Flora Gregory	124	9.3	+1.7
Majority				
Turnout		1,332		
Registered electors				
Liberal Democrats hold		Swing		

=== Chipping Norton ===
Chipping Norton
Party	Candidate	Votes	%	±%
Labour Co-op	Geoff Saul*	1,071	61.3	+22.4
Conservative	Peter Burns	362	20.7	−2.0
Green	Amy Long	197	11.3	+0.8
Liberal Democrats	Ivan Aguado Melet	116	6.6	+0.1
Majority				
Turnout		1,746		
Registered electors				
Labour Co-op hold		Swing		

=== Eynsham & Cassington ===
Eynsham & Cassington
Party	Candidate	Votes	%	±%
Liberal Democrats	Andy Goodwin*	996	49.8	−7.9
Conservative	Sean Grace	455	22.8	−1.6
Labour	Nick Relph	389	19.5	+12.0
Green	Nicholas Goodwin	160	8.0	−0.4
Majority				
Turnout		2,000		
Registered electors				
Liberal Democrats hold		Swing		

=== Freeland & Hanborough ===
Freeland & Hanborough
Party	Candidate	Votes	%	±%
Conservative	Roger Faulkner	587	39.4	−3.7
Liberal Democrats	Marie Stimpson	558	37.5	−13.2
Labour	Nell Davies-Small	152	10.2	N/A
Independent	Sam Newman	102	6.9	N/A
Green	Dan Eisenhandler	90	6.0	−0.2
Majority				
Turnout		1,489		
Registered electors				
Conservative hold		Swing		

The incumbent councillor, Alaa al-Yousuf, was originally elected as a Conservative but changed his affiliation to Independent prior to the election. He did not re-stand.

=== Hailey, Minster Lovell & Leafield ===
Hailey, Minster Lovell & Leafield
Party	Candidate	Votes	%	±%
Liberal Democrats	Paul Marsh	606	43.8	−0.2
Conservative	Paul Eaglestone	595	43.0	−6.1
Labour	Andy Bailey	109	7.9	+0.9
Green	James Styring	73	5.3	N/A
Majority				
Turnout		1,383		
Registered electors				
Liberal Democrats gain from Conservative		Swing		

=== Kingham, Rollright & Enstone ===
Kingham, Rollright & Enstone
Party	Candidate	Votes	%	±%
Conservative	Alex Wilson*	475	43.0	−7.1
Green	Arron Baker	448	40.5	+10.7
Labour Co-op	David Heyes	182	16.5	−3.6
Majority				
Turnout		1,105		
Registered electors				
Conservative hold		Swing		

=== Milton-Under-Wychwood ===
Milton-Under-Wychwood
Party	Candidate	Votes	%	±%
Liberal Democrats	Adam Clements	400	52.9	+31.2
Conservative	Jeff Haine*	292	38.6	−19.5
Labour Co-op	Sian O'Neill	42	5.6	−5.3
Green	Timothy Eden	22	2.9	−6.5
Majority				
Turnout		756		
Registered electors				
Liberal Democrats gain from Conservative		Swing		

=== North Leigh ===
North Leigh
Party	Candidate	Votes	%	±%
Conservative	Sarah Veasey	487	54.1	−5.2
Liberal Democrats	Hannah Massie	303	33.7	+19.3
Labour	Richard Kelsall	73	8.1	−7.2
Green	Frances Mortimer	37	4.1	−6.9
Majority				
Turnout		900		
Registered electors				
Conservative hold		Swing		

The incumbent councillor, Harry St John, was originally elected as a Conservative but changed his affiliation to Independent prior to the election. He did not re-stand.

=== Standlake, Aston & Stanton Harcourt ===
Standlake, Aston & Stanton Harcourt
Party	Candidate	Votes	%	±%
Liberal Democrats	Stephen Cosier	860	51.3	−6.7
Conservative	Lysette Nicholls*	672	40.1	−1.9
Labour	Marion Harley	97	5.8	N/A
Green	Alma Tumilowicz	48	2.9	N/A
Majority				
Turnout		1,677		
Registered electors				
Liberal Democrats gain from Conservative		Swing		

=== Stonesfield & Tackley ===
Stonesfield & Tackley
Party	Candidate	Votes	%	±%
Green	Genny Early	523	33.6	+23.4
Liberal Democrats	Gareth Epps	497	32.0	−13.6
Conservative	Sharone Parnes	390	25.1	−7.9
Labour	Kate England	145	9.3	−1.9
Majority				
Turnout		1,555		
Registered electors				
Green gain from Liberal Democrats		Swing		

=== Witney Central ===
Witney Central
Party	Candidate	Votes	%	±%
Labour	Andrew Coles*	800	52.6	+10.4
Conservative	Abdul Mubin	518	34.1	−7.0
Liberal Democrats	Serena Martin	109	7.2	−0.9
Green	Rae Cather	93	6.1	−2.4
Majority				
Turnout		1,520		
Registered electors				
Labour hold		Swing		

=== Witney East ===
Witney East
Party	Candidate	Votes	%	±%
Labour Co-op	Duncan Enright*	1,019	45.0	+3.5
Conservative	James Robertshaw	932	41.2	+2.0
Liberal Democrats	Sophie Roell	183	8.1	+0.4
Green	Harriet Marshall	129	5.7	−5.9
Majority				
Turnout		2,263		
Registered electors				
Labour Co-op hold		Swing		

=== Witney North ===
Witney North
Party	Candidate	Votes	%	±%
Green	Andrew Prosser*	451	31.3	−5.1
Liberal Democrats	Michelle Coulson	390	27.1	N/A
Conservative	Dean Temple	248	17.2	−4.8
Reform	Richard Langridge	215	14.9	−10.9
Labour	Georgia Meadows	136	9.4	−6.4
Majority				
Turnout		1,440		
Registered electors				
Green hold		Swing		

=== Witney South ===
Witney South
Party	Candidate	Votes	%	±%
Labour Co-op	Stuart McCarroll	706	42.3	−4.0
Conservative	David Edwards-Hughes	649	38.9	−5.1
Liberal Democrats	Peter Whitten	115	6.9	−2.8
Heritage	David Cox	99	5.9	N/A
Green	Ed Rolison	99	5.9	N/A
Majority				
Turnout		1,668		
Registered electors				
Labour Co-op gain from Conservative		Swing		

=== Witney West ===
Witney West
Party	Candidate	Votes	%	±%
Conservative	Jane Doughty*	636	41.7	−9.2
Liberal Democrats	Dan Coulson	533	34.9	+18.1
Labour	Sachin Thorogood	281	18.4	−8.7
Green	Penelope Ponton	76	5.0	−0.2
Majority				
Turnout		1,526		
Registered electors				
Conservative hold		Swing		

=== Woodstock & Bladon ===
Woodstock & Bladon
Party	Candidate	Votes	%	±%
Liberal Democrats	Elizabeth Poskitt*	618	43.1	−8.2
Conservative	Ian Hudspeth	480	33.4	+5.3
Labour	Mathew Parkinson	254	17.7	+2.7
Green	Barry Wheatley	83	5.8	+0.2
Majority				
Turnout		1,435		
Registered electors				
Liberal Democrats hold		Swing		

== By-elections ==
=== Chipping Norton ===
Chipping Norton by-election 14 November 2024
Party	Candidate	Votes	%	±%
Liberal Democrats	Mike Baggaley	403	31.3	+24.7
Conservative	Caspar Morris	383	29.7	+9.0
Labour	Kate England	350	27.2	−34.1
Green	Claire Lasko	152	11.8	+0.5
Majority		20	1.6	
Turnout		1,288		
Liberal Democrats gain from Labour		Swing		

=== Standlake, Aston & Stanton Harcourt ===
Standlake, Aston & Stanton Harcourt by-election: 1 May 2025
Party	Candidate	Votes	%	±%
Liberal Democrats	Sandra Cosier	725	41.7	–9.6
Conservative	Lysette Nicholls	592	34.0	–6.1
Reform	Richard Langridge	337	19.4	N/A
Green	Dan Eisenhandler	58	3.3	+0.4
Labour	Sian O'Neill	28	1.6	–4.2
Majority		133	7.7	–3.5
Turnout		1,741	46.4	
Registered electors		3,750		
Liberal Democrats hold		Swing	▼1.8	
