= West Oxfordshire =

Coordinates: 51°47′36″N 1°28′45″W

West Oxfordshire District
- Non-metropolitan district
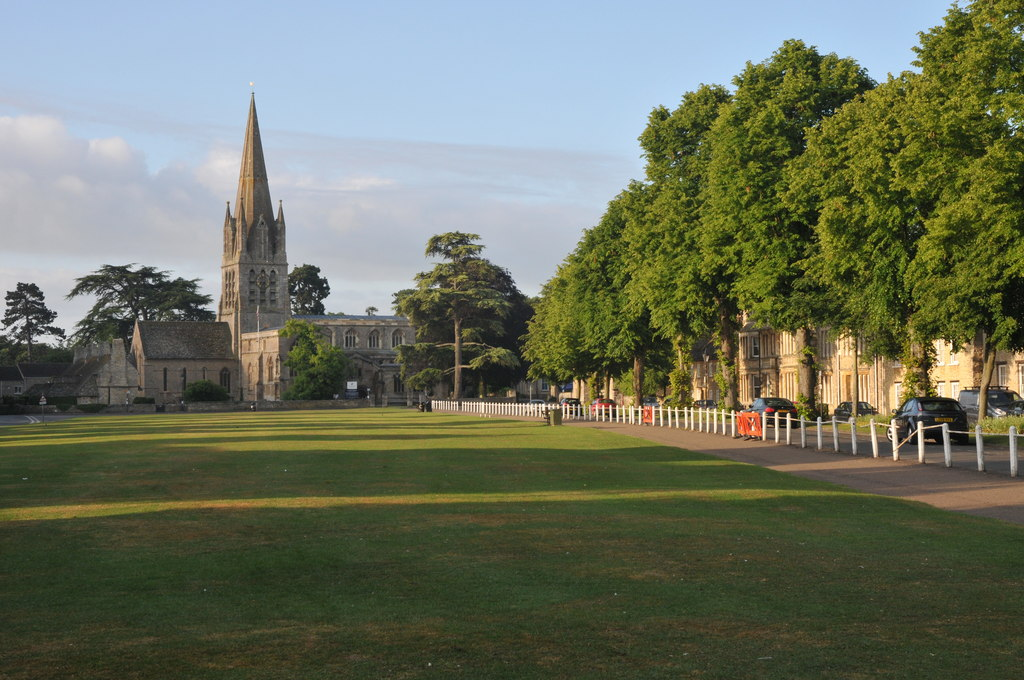
- Witney, the largest settlement and administrative centre of the district.

- West Oxfordshire shown within Oxfordshire
- Sovereign state: United Kingdom
- Constituent country: England
- Region: South East England
- Non-metropolitan county: Oxfordshire
- Status: Non-metropolitan district
- Admin HQ: Witney
- Incorporated: 1 April 1974

Government
  - Type: Non-metropolitan district council
  - Body: West Oxfordshire District Council
  - Leadership: Leader & Cabinet
  - MPs: Sean Woodcock; Calum Miller; Charlie Maynard

Area
  - Total: 275.83 sq mi (714.40 km^{2})
  - Rank: 46th (of 296)

Population (2025)
  - Total: 121,412
  - Rank: 206th (of 296)
  - Density: 440.17/sq mi (169.95/km^{2})

Ethnicity (2021)
  - Ethnic groups: List: 95.2% White; 1.9% Mixed; 1.7% Asian; 0.6% Black; 0.6% other

Religion (2021)
  - Religion: List: 51.5% Christianity; 40.6% no religion; 5.9% not stated; 0.7% Islam; 0.5% other; 0.4% Buddhism; 0.2% Hinduism; 0.2% Judaism; 0.1% Sikhism
- Time zone: UTC0 (GMT)
  - Summer (DST): UTC+1 (BST)
- ONS code: 38UF (ONS); E07000181 (GSS)
- OS grid reference: SP3591610698

West Oxfordshire is a local government district in northwest Oxfordshire, England, including towns such as Woodstock, Burford, Chipping Norton, Charlbury, Carterton and Witney, where the council is based.

== Area ==
The area is mainly rural downland and forest, with the main economic activities being farming and associated trades. West Oxfordshire lies within the River Thames catchment area, with the Thames itself and its tributaries including the River Evenlode and River Windrush running through the area. Parts of the district suffered severe flooding during the 2007 floods in the UK. Some areas of the district lie within the Cotswolds Area of Outstanding Natural Beauty.

== History ==
West Oxfordshire district was created on 1 April 1974 under the Local Government Act 1972, covering the area of five former districts, which were all abolished at the same time:

- Chipping Norton Municipal Borough
- Chipping Norton Rural District
- Witney Rural District
- Witney Urban District
- Woodstock Municipal Borough

The new district was named West Oxfordshire, describing its location within the wider county.

== Abolition ==
Under current local government reorganisation plans, all district councils in Oxfordshire, as well as the county council, will be abolished in 2028, with the district becoming part of a new North Oxfordshire unitary authority.

== Governance ==
West Oxfordshire District Council

Type
- Type: Non-metropolitan district

Leadership
- Chair: Carl Rylett, Liberal Democrat since 20 May 2026
- Leader: Andy Graham, Liberal Democrat since 18 May 2022
- Chief Executive: Philip Martin since 1 June 2026

Structure
- Seats: 49 councillors
- Political groups: Administration (32) Liberal Democrats (20) Labour (8) Green (4) Opposition (17) Conservative (16) Reform UK (1)

Elections
- Last election: 7 May 2026
- Next election: TBD

Meeting place
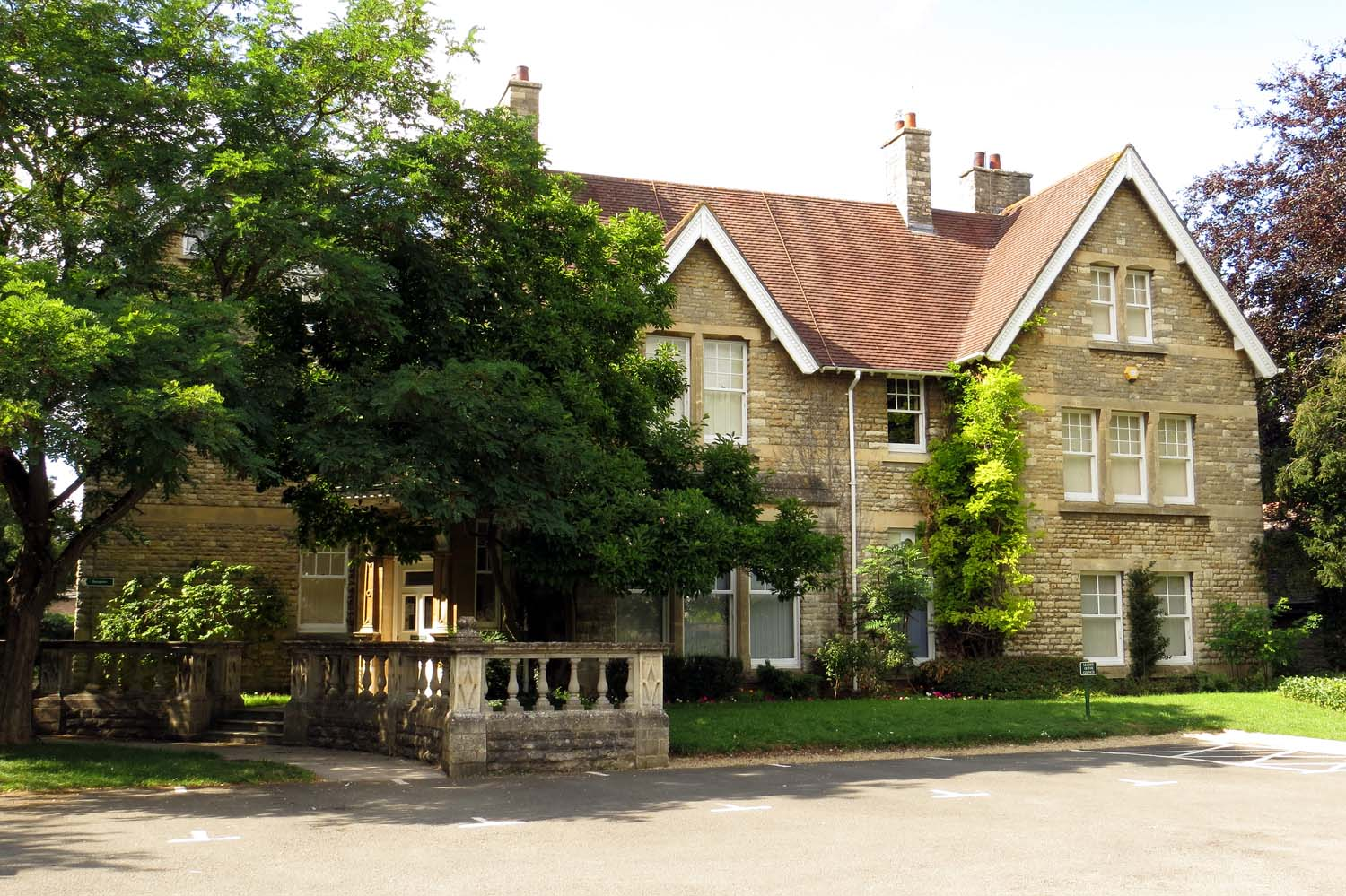
- Council Offices, Woodgreen, Witney, OX28 1NB

Website
- www.westoxon.gov.uk

Oxfordshire has a two-tier structure of local government, with the five district councils (including West Oxfordshire District Council) providing district-level services, and Oxfordshire County Council providing county-level services. There is also a third tier of local government in West Oxfordshire of civil parishes.

=== Political control ===
The council has been under no overall control since the 2022 election. The Liberal Democrats subsequently formed an administration with Labour and the Greens, with Liberal Democrat Andy Graham becoming the leader of the council. The same coalition continued following the 2023, 2024, and 2026 elections.

The first election to the district council was held in 1973, initially operating as a shadow authority alongside the outgoing authorities until it came into its powers on 1 April 1974. Political control of the council since 1974 has been as follows:

Party in control	Years
Independent	1974–1976
No overall control	1976–1983
Conservative	1983–1984
No overall control	1984–1987
Conservative	1987–1990
Independent	1990–1992
No overall control	1992–2000
Conservative	2000–2022
No overall control	2022–present

=== Leadership ===
The leaders of the council since 2001 have been:

Councillor	Party	From	To
Barry Norton	Conservative	2001	May 2016
James Mills	Conservative	18 May 2016	28 Oct 2020
Michele Mead	Conservative	28 Oct 2020	18 May 2022
Andy Graham	Liberal Democrats	18 May 2022	

=== Composition ===
Following the 2026 election the composition of the council is:

Party	Councillors
Liberal Democrats	20
Conservative	16
Labour	8
Green	4
Reform	1
Total	49

The next election is theoretically due in 2027 but the exact nature and timing of the election will be determined by proposed reforms to local government.

=== Elections ===
Since the last full review of boundaries in 2002, the council has comprised 49 councillors representing 27 wards. Elections are held in three out of every four years, with one third of the seats on the council being elected at each election. Oxfordshire County Council elections are held in the fourth year of the cycle when there are no district council elections.

=== Premises ===
The council is based at the former Witney Rural District Council offices on Woodgreen in Witney. The building was built as a large house in 1887 for one of the town's blanket manufacturers, and was originally known as Springfield, 39 Woodgreen. The building was acquired by Witney Rural District Council around 1966 and is now known as Council Offices, Woodgreen.

== Towns and parishes ==
The whole district is covered by civil parishes. The parishes of Burford, Carterton, Charlbury, Chipping Norton, Witney, and Woodstock have been declared towns and their parish councils therefore take the style 'town council'. Bampton is a post town, but has a parish council rather than a town council.
