= Electoral history of David Cameron =

List of elections featuring David Cameron as a candidate

This is a summary of the electoral history of David Cameron, who served as Prime Minister of the United Kingdom from 2010 to 2016 and Leader of the Conservative Party from 2005 to 2016, and as Foreign Secretary in the Sunak ministry from 2023 to 2024. He was also the member of parliament (MP) for Witney from 2001 to 2016.

== Parliamentary elections ==
=== 1997 general election, Stafford ===
General election 1997: Stafford
Party	Candidate	Votes	%	±%
Labour	David Kidney	24,606	47.5	+12.6
Conservative	David Cameron	20,292	39.2	−8.9
Liberal Democrats	Pam A. Hornby	5,480	10.6	−5.9
Referendum	Stephen R. Culley	1,146	2.2	New
Monster Raving Loony	Ashton A.N. May	248	0.5	New
Majority		4,314	8.3	
Turnout		51,772	76.6	−6.3
Labour gain from Conservative		Swing	+10.7	

=== 2001 general election, Witney ===
General election 2001: Witney
Party	Candidate	Votes	%	±%
Conservative	David Cameron	22,153	45.0	+2.0
Labour	Michael Bartlet	14,180	28.8	−1.8
Liberal Democrats	Gareth Epps	10,000	20.3	+0.4
Green	Mark Stevenson	1,100	2.2	+1.1
Independent	Barry Beadle	1,003	2.0	New
UKIP	Kenneth Dukes	767	1.6	+0.2
Majority		7,973	16.2	+3.8
Turnout		49,203	65.9	−10.8
Conservative hold		Swing	+1.9	

=== 2005 general election, Witney ===
General election 2005: Witney
Party	Candidate	Votes	%	±%
Conservative	David Cameron	26,571	49.3	+4.3
Liberal Democrats	Liz Leffman	12,415	23.0	+2.7
Labour	Tony Gray	11,845	22.0	−6.8
Green	Richard Dossett-Davies	1,682	3.2	+1.0
UKIP	Paul Wesson	1,356	2.5	+0.9
Majority		14,156	26.3	+10.1
Turnout		53,869	69.0	+3.1
Conservative hold		Swing	+0.8	

=== 2010 general election, Witney ===
General election 2010: Witney
Party	Candidate	Votes	%	±%
Conservative	David Cameron	33,973	58.8	+9.4
Liberal Democrats	Dawn Barnes	11,233	19.4	−3.1
Labour	Joe Goldberg	7,511	13.0	−9.4
Green	Stuart MacDonald	2,385	4.1	+1.0
UKIP	Nikolai Tolstoy	2,001	3.5	+0.9
Monster Raving Loony	Howling Laud Hope	234	0.3	New
Independent	Paul Wesson	166	0.3	New
Independent	Johnnie Cook	151	0.3	New
Wessex Regionalists	Colin Bex	62	0.1	New
Independent	Aaron Barschak	53	0.1	New
Majority		22,740	39.4	+12.5
Turnout		57,769	73.3	+4.3
Conservative hold		Swing	+6.3	

=== 2015 general election, Witney ===
General election 2015: Witney
Party	Candidate	Votes	%	±%
Conservative	David Cameron	35,201	60.2	+1.4
Labour	Duncan Enright	10,046	17.2	+4.2
UKIP	Simon Strutt	5,352	9.2	+5.7
Liberal Democrats	Andy Graham	3,953	6.8	−12.6
Green	Stuart MacDonald	2,970	5.1	+1.0
NHA	Clive Peedell	616	1.1	New
Wessex Regionalists	Colin Bex	110	0.2	+0.1
Independent	Christopher Tompson	94	0.2	New
Reduce VAT in Sport	Vivien Saunders	56	0.1	New
Give Me Back Elmo	Bobby Smith	37	0.1	New
Land Party	Deek Jackson	35	0.1	New
Independent	Nathan Handley	12	0.02	New
Majority		25,155	43.0	+3.6
Turnout		58,482	73.3	0.0
Conservative hold		Swing	−1.4	

== 2005 Conservative Party leadership election ==
Candidate	First ballot: 18 October 2005		Second ballot: 20 October 2005		Members' vote	
Candidate	Votes	%	Votes	%	Votes	%
David Cameron	56	28.3	90	45.5	134,446	67.6
David Davis	62	31.3	57	28.8	64,398	32.4
Liam Fox	42	21.2	51	25.7	Eliminated	
Kenneth Clarke	38	19.2	Eliminated			
Turnout	198	100	198	100	198,844	78.4 (Note: Turnout of 198,884 out of a membership of 253,600)
David Cameron elected

== United Kingdom general elections ==
=== 2010 general election ===
Summary of the May 2010 House of Commons of the United Kingdom election results
Political party	Leader	Candidates						Votes		
Political party	Leader	Nominated	Elected	Of total (%)	Gained	Lost	Net	Count	Proportion of total (%)	Change in proportion (%)
Conservative (Note: This figure excludes Speaker John Bercow (Buckingham))	David Cameron	631	306	47.1	100	3	+97	10,703,754	36.1	+3.7
Labour	Gordon Brown	631 (Note: Includes 43 Co-operative Party candidates, as part of the Labour-Co-op alliance)	258 (Note: Includes 28 Co-operative Party MPs, as part of the Labour-Co-op alliance)	39.7 (Note: Includes 4.3% for the Co-operative Party, as part of the Labour-Co-op alliance)	3	94	−91 (Note: Includes -1 Co-operative Party MPs, as part of the Labour-Co-op alliance)	8,609,527 (Note: Includes 776,358 for the Co-operative Party, as part of the Labour-Co-op alliance)	29.0 (Note: Includes 2.9% for the Co-operative Party, as part of the Labour-Co-op alliance)	−6.2 (Note: Includes +0.8% for the Co-operative Party, as part of the Labour-Co-op alliance)
Liberal Democrats	Nick Clegg	631	57	8.8	8	13	−5	6,836,824	23.0	+1.0
UKIP	Lord Pearson	558	0	0	0	0	0	919,546	3.1	+0.9
BNP	Nick Griffin	338	0	0	0	0	0	564,331	1.9	+1.2
SNP	Alex Salmond	59	6	0.9	0	0	0	491,386	1.7	+0.1
Green	Caroline Lucas	310	1	0.2	1	0	+1	265,247	0.9	−0.2
Sinn Féin	Gerry Adams	17	5	0.8	0	0	0	171,942	0.6	−0.1
DUP	Peter Robinson	16	8	1.2	0	1	−1	168,216	0.6	−0.3
Plaid Cymru	Ieuan Wyn Jones	40	3	0.5	1	0	+1	165,394	0.6	−0.1
SDLP	Margaret Ritchie	18	3	0.5	0	0	0	110,970	0.4	−0.1
UCU-NF	Reg Empey	17	0	0	0	1	−1	102,361	0.3	−0.1
English Democrat	Robin Tilbrook	107	0	0	0	0	0	64,826	0.2	0.2
Alliance	David Ford	18	1	0.2	1	0	+1	42,762	0.1	0.0
Respect	Salma Yaqoob	11	0	0	0	1	−1	33,251	0.1	−0.1
TUV	Jim Allister	10	0	0	0	0	0	26,300	0.1	—N/a
Speaker	—N/a	1	1	0.2	0	0	0	22,860	0.1	0.0
Independent – Rodney Connor	—N/a	1	0	0	0	0	0	21,300	0.1	—N/a
Independent – Sylvia Hermon	—N/a	1	1	0.2	1	0	+1	21,181	0.1	—N/a
Christian	George Hargreaves	71	0	0	0	0	0	18,623	0.1	+0.1
Green	Eleanor Scott and Patrick Harvie	20	0	0	0	0	0	16,827	0.1	0.0
Health Concern	Richard Taylor	1	0	0	0	1	−1	16,150	0.1	0.0
Independent – Bob Spink	—N/a	1	0	0	0	0	0	12,174	0.0	—N/a
TUSC	Dave Nellist	37	0	0	0	0	0	12,275	0.0	—N/a
National Front	Ian Edward	17	0	0	0	0	0	10,784	0.0	0.0
Buckinghamshire Campaign for Democracy	John Stevens	1	0	0	0	0	0	10,331	0.0	—N/a
Monster Raving Loony	Howling Laud Hope	27	0	0	0	0	0	7,510	0.0	0.0
Socialist Labour	Arthur Scargill	23	0	0	0	0	0	7,196	0.0	−0.1
Liberal	Rob Wheway	5	0	0	0	0	0	6,781	0.0	−0.1
Blaenau Gwent PV	Dai Davies	1	0	0	0	1	−1	6,458	0.0	−0.1
CPA	Alan Craig	17	0	0	0	0	0	6,276	0.0	0.0
Mebyon Kernow	Dick Cole	6	0	0	0	0	0	5,379	0.0	0.0
Lincolnshire Independent	Marianne Overton	3	0	0	0	0	0	5,311	0.0	—N/a
Mansfield Independent Forum		1	0	0	0	0	0	4,339	0.0	—N/a
Green (NI)	Mark Bailey and Karly Greene	4	0	0	0	0	0	3,542	0.0	0.0
Socialist	Peter Taaffe	4	0	0	0	0	0	3,298	0.0	0.0
Trust	Stuart Wheeler	2	0	0	0	0	0	3,233	0.0	—N/a
Scottish Socialist	Colin Fox and Frances Curran	10	0	0	0	0	0	3,157	0.0	−0.1
People Before Profit	—N/a	1	0	0	0	0	0	2,936	0.0	—N/a
Local Liberals People Before Politics		1	0	0	0	0	0	1,964	0.0	—N/a
Independent – Esther Rantzen	—N/a	1	0	0	0	0	0	1,872	0.0	—N/a
Alliance for Green Socialism	Mike Davies	6	0	0	0	0	0	1,581	0.0	0.0
SDP	Peter Johnson	2	0	0	0	0	0	1,551	0.0	—N/a
Pirate	Andrew Robinson	9	0	0	0	0	0	1,348	0.0	—N/a
Common Sense Party	Howard Thomas	2	0	0	0	0	0	1,173	0.0	0.0
Staffordshire Independent Group		1	0	0	0	0	0	1,208	0.0	0.0
Tendring First	Terry Allen	1	0	0	0	0	0	1,078	0.0	0.0
Solihull and Meriden Residents Association		2	0	0	0	0	0	977	0.0	0.0
Communist	Robert Griffiths	6	0	0	0	0	0	947	0.0	0.0
Democratic Labour	Brian Powell	1	0	0	0	0	0	842	0.0	0.0
English Independence Party		1	0	0	0	0	0	803	0.0	0.0
Democratic Nationalist Party		2	0	0	0	0	0	753	0.0	—N/a
Save King George Hospital		1	0	0	0	0	0	746	0.0	0.0
Workers Revolutionary	Sheila Torrance	7	0	0	0	0	0	738	0.0	0.0
Peace	John Morris	3	0	0	0	0	0	737	0.0	0.0
Animal Protection	—N/a	4	0	0	0	0	0	675	0.0	0.0
Christian Movement for Great Britain		2	0	0	0	0	0	598	0.0	0.0
New Millennium Bean Party	Captain Beany	1	0	0	0	0	0	558	0.0	0.0
Total		3,720	650	100	115	115	0	29,687,604	Turnout: 65.1	

=== 2015 general election ===
The following table shows final election results as reported by BBC News and The Guardian.

Summary (Note: 66 parties are grouped together as 'other parties'. None of those parties contested more than 2 constituencies, or received more than 300 votes) of the May 2015 House of Commons of the United Kingdom results
Political party	Leader	MPs						Votes		
Political party	Leader	Candidates	Total	Gained	Lost	Net	Of total (%)	Total	Of total (%)	Change (Note: This column shows the change in vote share percentage from the 2010 general election to the 2015 general election. It does not account for by-elections.) (%)
Conservative (Note: BBC News includes the Speaker of the House of Commons, John Bercow, in the MP tally and the vote tally for the Conservatives. See About these results, BBC News (30 April 2015). In this table, however, the speaker (who usually does not vote in the Commons) is listed separately, and has been removed from the Conservative tally.)	David Cameron	647	330	35	11	+24	50.8	11,299,609	36.8	+0.7
Labour	Ed Miliband	631 (Note: Includes 42 Co-operative Party candidates, as part of the Labour-Co-op alliance)	232 (Note: Includes 24 Co-operative Party MPs, as part of the Labour-Co-op alliance)	22 (Note: Includes 3 Co-operative Party MPs, as part of the Labour-Co-op alliance)	48 (Note: Includes 7 Co-operative Party MPs, as part of the Labour-Co-op alliance)	−26 (Note: Includes -4 Co-operative Party MPs, as part of the Labour-Co-op alliance)	35.7 (Note: Includes 3.7% for the Co-operative Party, as part of the Labour-Co-op alliance)	9,347,273 (Note: Includes 873,399 for the Co-operative Party, as part of the Labour-Co-op alliance)	30.4 (Note: Includes 2.8% for the Co-operative Party, as part of the Labour-Co-op alliance)	+1.5 (Note: Includes -0.1% for the Co-operative Party, as part of the Labour-Co-op alliance)
UKIP	Nigel Farage	624	1	1	0	+1	0.2	3,881,099	12.6	+9.5
Liberal Democrats	Nick Clegg	631	8	0	49	−49	1.2	2,415,916	7.9	−15.1
SNP	Nicola Sturgeon	59	56	50	0	+50	8.6	1,454,436	4.7	+3.1
Green Party of England and Wales	Natalie Bennett	538	1	0	0	0	0.2	1,111,603	3.8	+2.7
DUP	Peter Robinson	16	8	1	1	0	1.2	184,260	0.6	0.0
Plaid Cymru	Leanne Wood	40	3	0	0	0	0.5	181,704	0.6	0.0
Sinn Féin	Gerry Adams	18	4	0	1	−1	0.6	176,232	0.6	0.0
UUP	Mike Nesbitt	15	2	2	0	+2	0.3	114,935	0.4	—N/a (Note: The UUP did not run itself in 2010; instead, it ran candidates under the Ulster Conservatives and Unionists banner.)
SDLP	Alasdair McDonnell	18	3	0	0	0	0.5	99,809	0.3	0.0
Independent	—N/a	170	1	0	0	0	0.2	98,711	0.3	—N/a
Alliance	David Ford	18	0	0	1	−1	0	61,556	0.2	+0.1
Scottish Green	Patrick Harvie / Maggie Chapman	32	0	0	0	0	0	39,205	0.1	0.0
TUSC	Dave Nellist	128	0	0	0	0	0	36,490	0.1	+0.1
Speaker	John Bercow	1	1	0	0	0	0.2	34,617	0.1	0.0
NHA (Note: BBC News lists the National Health Action Party together with Independent Community and Health Concern (formerly known as Independent Kidderminster Hospital and Health Concern), which is affiliated with the larger party, for a total of 20,210 votes. The Guardian lists each party separately. Health Concern received 7,211 of the votes attributed to the National Health Action Party.)	Richard Taylor & Clive Peedell	13	0	0	0	0	0	20,210	0.1	0.0
TUV	Jim Allister	7	0	0	0	0	0	16,538	0.1	0.0
Respect	George Galloway	4	0	0	0	0	0	9,989	0.0	−0.1
CISTA	Paul Birch	34	0	0	0	0	0	8,419	0.0	New
People Before Profit	Collective	1	0	0	0	0	0	7,854	0.0	0.0
Green (NI)	Steven Agnew	5	0	0	0	0	0	6,822	0.0	0.0
Yorkshire First	Richard Carter	14	0	0	0	0	0	6,811	0.0	New
English Democrat	Robin Tilbrook	35	0	0	0	0	0	6,531	0.0	−0.2
Mebyon Kernow	Dick Cole	6	0	0	0	0	0	5,675	0.0	0.0
Lincolnshire Independent	Marianne Overton	5	0	0	0	0	0	5,407	0.0	0.0
Liberal	Steve Radford	4	0	0	0	0	0	4,480	0.0	0.0
Monster Raving Loony	Alan "Howling Laud" Hope	27	0	0	0	0	0	3,898	0.0	0.0
Independent Save Withybush Save Lives	Chris Overton	1	0	0	0	0	0	3,729	0.0	New
Socialist Labour	Arthur Scargill	8	0	0	0	0	0	3,481	0.0	0.0
CPA	Sidney Cordle	17	0	0	0	0	0	3,260	0.0	0.0
Christian (Note: The BBC groups together the votes under the Scottish Christian Party (1,467 votes); Christian Party (1,040 votes); and Christian (698 votes) labels, for a total of 3,205 votes. The Guardian lists these designations separately.)	Jeff Green	9	0	0	0	0	0	3,205	0.0	−0.1
No description (Note: Candidates who do not specify a party or Independent are categorised as No description)	—N/a		0	0	0	0	0	3,012	0.0	—N/a
Workers' Party	John Lowry	5	0	0	0	0	0	2,724	0.0	0.0
North East	Hilton Dawson	4	0	0	0	0	0	2,138	0.0	0.0
Poole People	Mike Howell	1	0	0	0	0	0	1,766	0.0	New
BNP	Adam Walker	8	0	0	0	0	0	1,667	0.0	−1.9
Residents for Uttlesford	John Lodge	1	0	0	0	0	0	1,658	0.0	New
Rochdale First Party	Farooq Ahmed	1	0	0	0	0	0	1,535	0.0	New
Communist (Note: The Guardian lists the vote totals for the Communist Party of Britain, Communist Party, Scottish Communist Party Conservatives, and the designation "Communist" separately. In this table, these designations are grouped into a single Communist tally.)	Robert David Griffiths	9	0	0	0	0	0	1,229	0.0	New
Pirate	Laurence Kaye	6	0	0	0	0	0	1,130	0.0	0.0
National Front	Kevin Bryan	7	0	0	0	0	0	1,114	0.0	0.0
Communities United	Kamran Malik	5	0	0	0	0	0	1,102	0.0	New
Reality	Mark "Bez" Berry	3	0	0	0	0	0	1,029	0.0	New
The Southport Party	David Cobham	1	0	0	0	0	0	992	0.0	New
All People's Party	Prem Goyal	4	0	0	0	0	0	981	0.0	New
Peace	John Morris	4	0	0	0	0	0	957	0.0	New
Bournemouth Independent Alliance	David Ross	1	0	0	0	0	0	903	0.0	New
Socialist (GB)	Collective	10	0	0	0	0	0	899	0.0	New
Scottish Socialist	Executive Committee	4	0	0	0	0	0	875	0.0	0.0
Alliance for Green Socialism	Mike Davies	4	0	0	0	0	0	852	0.0	0.0
Your Vote Could Save Our Hospital	Sandra Allison	1	0	0	0	0	0	849	0.0	New
Wigan Independents	Gareth Fairhurst	1	0	0	0	0	0	768	0.0	New
Animal Welfare	Vanessa Hudson	4	0	0	0	0	0	736	0.0	0.0
Something New	James Smith	2	0	0	0	0	0	695	0.0	New
Consensus	Helen Tyrer	1	0	0	0	0	0	637	0.0	New
National Liberal	National Council	2	0	0	0	0	0	627	0.0	New
Independents Against Social Injustice	Steve Walmsley	1	0	0	0	0	0	603	0.0	New
Independence from Europe	Mike Nattrass	5	0	0	0	0	0	578	0.0	New
Whig	Waleed Ghani	4	0	0	0	0	0	561	0.0	New
Guildford Greenbelt Group	Susan Parker	1	0	0	0	0	0	538	0.0	New
Class War	Ian Bone	7	0	0	0	0	0	526	0.0	New
Above and Beyond	Mark Flanagan	5	0	0	0	0	0	522	0.0	New
Northern	Mark Dawson	5	0	0	0	0	0	506	0.0	New
Workers Revolutionary	Sheila Torrance	7	0	0	0	0	0	488	0.0	0.0
Left Unity	Kate Hudson	3	0	0	0	0	0	455	0.0	New
Liberty GB	Paul Weston	3	0	0	0	0	0	418	0.0	New
People First	Collective	1	0	0	0	0	0	407	0.0	New
Other parties (Note: 66 parties, none of which contested more than 2 constituencies, each with under 300 votes)	—N/a		0	0	0	0	0	7,958	0.0	—N/a
Total		3,921	650					30,697,525		
