= Winston McKenzie =

British boxer

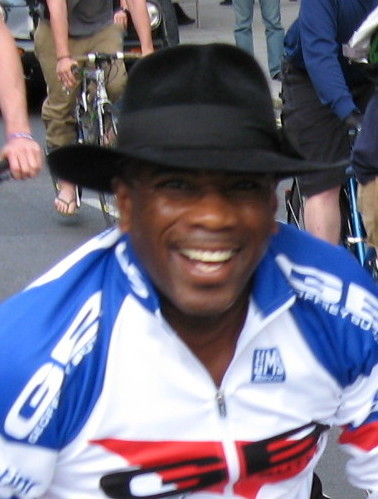
- McKenzie in 2007
- Born: 6 October 1953 (age 73); Croydon, England
- Occupation: Political activist
- Political party: Unity in Action (2017–present)
- Other political affiliations: English Democrats (2015–2017); UKIP (2009–2015); Unity Party (2009); Conservative (2006–2008); Veritas (2005); Liberal Democrats (2002–2003); Labour (until 2001)
- Relatives: Duke McKenzie (brother); Clinton McKenzie (brother)

Winston Truman McKenzie (born 6 October 1953) is a British political activist and perennial candidate for public office. He is currently a founder and leader of the Unity in Action Party. He has been a member of every major UK political party, and has stood as an independent or minor party candidate on numerous occasions without success.

A British Jamaican, McKenzie worked as a boxer before later running a pub with his brothers; it was closed down after police found many of its customers to possess weapons and drugs.

He was a member of the Labour Party from the 1980s until 2001. The following year he joined the Liberal Democrats, staying with them until 2003; he then remained politically independent for some time before becoming a member of Veritas, going back to standing as an independent, then back to Veritas to unsuccessfully contest their leadership election. In 2006 he joined the Conservative Party, standing to be their London mayoral candidate but failing to be shortlisted, before becoming a political independent again.

In 2009, he tried to establish his own Unity Party, but this failed owing to a lack of financial backing; McKenzie then joined the UK Independence Party. He stood for its leadership in 2010 and was the UKIP candidate in the 2012 Croydon North by-election, where he came third with 5.7% of the vote - his best ever election performance. He served as UKIP's Commonwealth spokesman from 2014 until 9 March 2015, when he was sacked over a series of gaffes.

Following an acrimonious departure from UKIP, McKenzie joined the English Democrats in December 2015 and attempted to run for Mayor of London in the 2016 election. That year, he competed on the reality television show Celebrity Big Brother, and was the first contestant to be eliminated, after receiving negative attention for his views on homosexuality. In 2017, he left the English Democrats and founded his own party, Unity in Action.

Once a regular fixture in British politics, standing in up to three elections per year, McKenzie has stood for public office only once since 2018. He blamed an abortive attempt to stand for Mayor of London in 2021 on difficulties he encountered with filling out forms.

He stood in the 2022 Croydon Mayoral Election as an independent, campaigning on a platform based largely on local economic stimulation and regeneration. He received 1,324 (1.4%) votes, losing to Conservative candidate and former councillor for South Croydon, Jason Perry.

== Background ==
An elder brother of boxer Duke McKenzie and a younger brother of boxer Clinton McKenzie, Winston McKenzie was an amateur middleweight boxer. He also fought professionally as a super-welterweight in a career spanning 1975 to 1982, winning six of his 16 fights, and being knocked out nine times. He contended that after an underprivileged childhood, "boxing was my salvation". At the age of 23, his boxing career suffered a setback after he suffered two detached retinas, although he continued to box for many years.

He later worked as a hairdresser, a rug wholesaler, a letting agent and a garage mechanic. He also ran a pub in Parchmore Road, Thornton Heath with his brothers. When the McKenzies bought the pub, it had "a notorious reputation... as a 'battleground' rife with gangsters and drug pushers until the brothers took over." They opened it as the McKenzie Bros Bar & Grill, but it was threatened with removal of its licence in July 2001 "after being caught several times by police serving alcohol after hours." It closed down in December 2002, after a single police raid resulted in 25 people on the premises being charged with various drugs and firearms offences. The pub was boarded up after the raid, and McKenzie confirmed in January 2003 that it would not be reopening. The building has been demolished. In 2005 he unsuccessfully auditioned for The X Factor.

== Political career ==
=== Labour, Lib Dems and Independent ===
McKenzie joined the Labour Party in the 1980s. In 2002 he joined the Liberal Democrats and, in February 2003, was quoted in the press as saying "I'm still very involved with the Liberal Democrats and have every intention of standing for MP in the next election." Seven months later he had left the Lib Dems.

He stood in the September 2003 Brent East by-election as an independent candidate on a slogan of "The black voice for Great Britain". He pledged to "shut all gates of entry to immigrants and asylum seekers" (and ask the US to take on Britain's immigrants in exchange for Britain's support in the Iraq War), and to increase sports facilities for young people. He also opposed university tuition fees on the grounds that young people should be able "to enjoy the privileges of childhood." He polled 197 votes (0.94%), coming seventh out of 16 candidates.

=== Veritas, Independent and Veritas again ===
McKenzie joined the newly formed Veritas party in 2005, calling for "a blanket ban on immigration and asylum for one year", and becoming its principal spokesman on sport. In the 2005 general election he stood for Veritas in Croydon North, coming seventh of nine candidates with 324 votes (0.7%). After the election he denounced party leader Robert Kilroy-Silk, whom he publicly blamed for his defeat, his lost deposit and other financial losses as a result of his campaign. He resigned from Veritas two weeks after the 2005 election (and three months after joining). He rejoined Veritas when Kilroy-Silk stepped down as leader, so that he could stand for leader of the party. He came third out of three candidates, polling 168 votes (14.4%).

In between his two short memberships of Veritas, he stood on 16 June 2005 Fieldway by-election to Croydon Council as an independent. He came fourth of five candidates, polling 47 votes (2.47%), only surpassing the votes received by the Official Monster Raving Loony Party candidate.

=== Conservative and Independent - 2008 London mayoral candidacy ===
After the local press reported that his 2004 "inaugural Croydon youth games ended in farce [in] October after many events were cancelled at short notice", McKenzie accused the local Conservative council of being "racist" in failing to support the endeavour. However, in November 2006 he joined the Conservative Party and announced his intention to be the next Mayor of London. He stood in 2007 for the Conservative Party's nomination, but failed to attract enough support to make the shortlist. He then left the Conservative Party by the end of the year and stood in the 2008 mayoral election as an independent candidate, under the slogans "I float like a butterfly and sting like a bee; I've got the policies they can't see" and "They said it couldn't be done". He came last of the 10 candidates, polling 5,389 votes (0.22%).

=== Unity Party ===
McKenzie founded the Unity Party in March 2009, and announced he would be the Unity Party candidate for Croydon Central at the next UK general election. In October 2009, McKenzie reported that Unity had folded as a party because of the withdrawal of its main financial backer.

=== UK Independence Party ===
==== 2009–10: leadership elections, general election ====
McKenzie joined the UK Independence Party (UKIP) in September 2009, and immediately announced he was a candidate to succeed Nigel Farage in its leadership election. However, McKenzie was barred from standing because he was still the leader of the Unity Party. In February 2010 he was adopted as UKIP's candidate for Tottenham. In the 2010 general election he came sixth of 10 candidates in Tottenham, polling 466 votes (1.1%).

McKenzie sought to stand again for leader of UKIP in September 2010, after Lord Pearson of Rannoch resigned. He came last of the four candidates, with 530 votes cast (5.3%).

==== 2011–12: London Mayoral, Assembly elections, Croydon North by-election ====
McKenzie confirmed in May 2011 that he was again hoping to be Mayor of London, this time under the banner of UKIP. He told UKIP paper The Voice: "The rumours are true. I am definitely looking to be nominated as a candidate." There were five other candidates for the UKIP nomination: David Coburn, Michael Corby, Mick McGough, Paul Oakley and Lawrence Webb. In a ballot of members in August 2011, McKenzie came joint third with McGough, both on 7.4%, behind winner Webb, who had 42%, and David Coburn on 29%.

In January 2012, UKIP announced that it had selected McKenzie as candidate for the Croydon and Sutton seat in the 2012 elections to the London Assembly. At the pre-election hustings in Croydon, a local newspaper reported that "he provided the audience with some welcome, but not always intentional, comic relief". When the issue of the building of a new waste incinerator was raised he announced "To be honest, ref, I'm not too hot on this issue", and the paper noted that he did not have "the first clue about the incinerator debate" and had a "lack of policies". He also bizarrely stated: "A couple of people in the audience to-night, I can see your faces. I owe you money.... You know where to find me." In the election he polled 10,757 votes (6.99%) across the boroughs of Croydon and Sutton, an increase of 1.6% on the UKIP vote in 2008, coming fourth of five candidates.

In October 2012 he was announced as the UKIP candidate for the Croydon North by-election. On 27 November 2012, McKenzie gave two interviews to the Croydon Advertiser and the London Metro which were repeated in the local and national press. He was reported to have commented that adoption by same-sex couples constitutes "child abuse", and asked the interviewer,

"If you couldn't look after your child and you had to put them up for adoption, would you honestly want your child to be adopted by a gay couple? Would you seriously want that or a heterosexual family? Which would be more healthy for the child? A caring loving home is a heterosexual or single family. I don't believe [a same-sex couple] is healthy for a child."

The comments were condemned by Ben Summerskill, Chief Executive of Stonewall, as "inflammatory", while UKIP distanced itself from the comments. The Croydon Advertiser interview also described as "a bizarre rant" McKenzie's related comments about people who "pretend" to be gay:

"Some people take on being gay as a sort of fashion. Celebrities come out to become more well known, it gets attention. It's a fact of life that some people actually are gay. They are what they are. They can't help it but the other bunch take on being gay as a fashion and push it because they have nothing better to do with their lives. They let the side down."

The subsequent Metro interview, held to clarify McKenzie's earlier remarks, quoted him as elaborating: "To say to a child, 'I am having you adopted by two men who kiss regularly but don't worry about it' – that is abuse. It is a violation of a child’s human rights because that child has no opportunity to grow up under normal circumstances."

In the Croydon North by-election, McKenzie came third with 5.7% of the vote, beating the Liberal Democrats and the Green Party. He also retained his deposit for the first time in his political career.

==== 2013–14: local election, local difficulties ====
During campaigning for the 2014 local and European elections, a UKIP event organised in Croydon was picketed by protestors angry at Nigel Farage's recent comments on Romanian immigrants and bearing a placard reading "We Are Romanians". McKenzie said that the protesters had "diminished the meaning of racism.... They've taken away the meaning of racism, which is a very potent subject." A steel band had been booked to play at the event but walked out, in full view of TV news camera crews, once they learned that it was a UKIP event. Farage had been due to attend but did not arrive, and McKenzie informed reporters that:

"It's not a case of being scared, it's a case of being a responsible family man and it is like being a boxer going into the ring. There are certain situations that you do not go into. If he hasn't turned up then he's a very sensible man. Croydon which used to be the place to shop has now become a dump. How can an international leader turn up somewhere he feels unsafe? Croydon has deteriorated over successive Labour and Tory governments and now we have a coalition Croydon has descended into depravity"

before adding that "Croydon is unsafe and a dump." He was not elected to Croydon Council, polling 480 votes, and coming ninth of 14 candidates. The incident led to McKenzie earning the local sobriquet, "Chump from the Dump".

McKenzie lost the confidence of his local UKIP branch, amid claims he and his partner Marianne Bowness mishandled thousands of pounds of branch funds, failing to account for the spending or to keep adequate receipts. He was suspended as branch chairman, and later replaced. Members signed motions of no confidence in McKenzie, and called an Extraordinary General Meeting to remove him.

==== 2015: general election, acrimonious departure from UKIP ====
McKenzie was the UKIP candidate for Croydon North in the 2015 general election. He had been Chairman of the Lambeth and Croydon North branch of UKIP, but was suspended on 19 December 2014 after "months of infighting" and accusations that he had misappropriated donations.

UKIP sacked McKenzie from his position as Commonwealth spokesman for the party in March 2015, although he retained his position as prospective candidate for Croydon North. In the 2015 general election he came third, again beating the Liberal Democrats and the Green Party, and again retaining his deposit with 5.4% of the vote.

In November 2015, McKenzie said on ITV News that he had been overlooked for the London elections as a mayoral or London Assembly candidate, and claimed this was owing to racism amongst senior UKIP officials. He said he was resigning from the party, and he cast his UKIP badge onto the table. He declared he would stand for London Mayor as an independent candidate.

=== English Democrats ===
McKenzie joined the English Democrats in December 2015.

==== 2016 abortive Mayoral bid: paperwork problems and financial controversy ====
Almost immediately after joining the English Democrats, McKenzie was selected as the party's candidate for the 2016 London mayoral election, at a national council meeting held in Bradford. A party statement declared McKenzie to be "the most influential Black English political figure today".

However, his nomination papers for the mayoral election were not completed properly before the close of nominations, so he was ineligible to stand in that election. Election administrators London Elects blamed McKenzie for leaving his paperwork to the last minute, saying "The English Democrats' prospective candidate for London Mayor, Winston McKenzie, met with London Elects for the first time at 13.45 on March 31, 2016. At that time, the paperwork was incomplete. Mr. McKenzie was given the opportunity to resolve matters by the 4pm legal deadline."

It later emerged that there was also some controversy over the disappearance of campaign funds, after McKenzie had fundraised for a target £60,000 Mayoral campaign, including the £20,000 cost of a deposit. Refuting allegations of malfeasance from Inside Croydon, McKenzie insisted: “£20,000 was paid in cash at City Hall”, for the London election. It was subsequently confirmed, both by election administrators, and by the Leader of the English Democrats who accompanied McKenzie as the paperwork was submitted, that no money had been ever been paid. Inside Croydon asked:

"What appears to have happened, whether through accident or design, is that Winston McKenzie walked away from City Hall that day with several thousand pounds in money which had been donated in good faith for the purpose of his standing in the Mayoral elections. What remains unexplained is what efforts, if any, McKenzie has made in the past six months to return any of that money to his various donors and supporters after he was unable to use it for the purpose intended."

As of December 2016, the fate of the missing money was still unknown.

==== Witney by-election and English Democrats leadership bid ====
On 8 April 2016 it was confirmed that McKenzie would be standing in a borough council by-election in Croydon to be held on the same day as the mayoral election. In October he stood in the by-election in the Oxfordshire seat of Witney, left vacant by the resignation of David Cameron. He came 12th of 14 candidates, with 52 votes, less than half the votes received by the Official Monster Raving Loony Party candidate.

In December 2016, less than a year after joining the English Democrats, McKenzie announced that he was standing for the party's leadership, seeking to unseat its long-serving leader Robin Tilbrook. Tilbrook responded that he was "unconcerned" by the challenge. It later emerged that the English Democrats did not as yet have a procedure for challenging a sitting leader, and a review then underway would not provide such a procedure until March 2017 at the earliest. McKenzie chose to resign from the English Democrats in early 2017 instead.

=== Unity in Action ===
In 2017 McKenzie registered the Unity in Action Party with the Electoral Commission, declaring himself as Leader, and his partner, Marianne Bowness, as Treasurer. He and Bowness stood for Croydon Council in the 2018 Croydon London Borough Council election, but they were not elected, respectively coming in last and second-last of 14 candidates in his council ward, each polling 59 votes (0.46%) and 63 votes (0.49%).

==== Difficulties filling out forms ====
McKenzie announced his intention to stand as Unity in Action's candidate for Mayor of London in the 2021 London mayoral election, which had been postponed from 2020 due to the COVID-19 pandemic. However, McKenzie later explained that administrative difficulties prevented him from standing, including routine re-registration with the Electoral Commission, which was "Not as easy as we imagined!", as a team of four volunteers for his party "found they were unable to even log-in with their own email details, or pass codes." After McKenzie's party grappled for four and a half months to log into the website used by every registered political party in the UK, the Commission declined their application, flagging 8 issues with Unity in Action's constitution. Further attempts to amend the party constitution ran out of time before the election registration deadline. McKenzie lamented: "All Party Candidates had to be stood down. All deposits returned. Sponsorship cancelled!"

== Celebrity Big Brother ==
In January 2016, McKenzie became a contestant on the Channel 5 reality television show Celebrity Big Brother., expressing the view that doing so was a "good opportunity to get exposure" for his mayoral candidacy. McKenzie stated that if there was to be a gay person in the house, "I guess I'll just have to stand with my back against a brick wall all the time." Upon making these comments, McKenzie was booed by the audience. Within two days, the regulator Ofcom received over 300 complaints about his comments. McKenzie was however defended by the spokesperson for the English Democrats, Steve Uncles, who compared the gay community to Nazis "when it comes to freedom of speech" and stated that McKenzie's viewpoint was being unfairly demonised given that – in his view – any Muslim contestants on Celebrity Big Brother would try to throw gay men off buildings.

During his time in the house, he reiterated his previous comments on child adoption by LGBT couples to Angie Bowie (the bisexual ex-wife of David Bowie), referring to such adoption as "child abuse", a view which Bowie clearly abhorred. Housemates and viewers of the programme considered his views towards homosexuality as wrong and also "disgusting". McKenzie was evicted via housemates' votes 13/14 on 8 January. During an interview with Emma Willis upon his eviction, she interrogated him on his controversial time in the house he referred to his time in the CBB house, saying that "I'm a boxer. Amateur professional. I thought I knew everything. But when I walked into the house and heard other people’s stories, anxieties, what they've been through, I realised you don't know everything. There are people out there who really give it their all.... It's such a revelation for me."

== Personal life ==
Asked to name his proudest achievements, McKenzie said, "Of all the things in life that one could possibly achieve, I guess I am proud of the honour, dignity and self-respect that I have earned throughout the years through boxing, politics and the love of my former wife, Cheryl."

McKenzie's long-term partner is Marianne Bowness, formerly the wife of Peter [later Lord] Bowness. In 2015, McKenzie recalled that they first met when she was the Mayoress of Croydon (in 1979–80), and her husband gave an honour to the McKenzie brothers for their work in boxing. Several years later, after the breakup of her marriage, she volunteered to manage the opening of his pub, the McKenzie Bros Bar and Grill, whilst McKenzie offered to help her lose weight, from 18 stone to 11 stone.

In an interview with Chat Politics, McKenzie likened UKIP leader Nigel Farage to Jesus Christ and non-stick Teflon, saying that "Jesus was one man, we're his army. Farage is one man, and we're his army and that's what it's all about," adding that "Farage is like Teflon – he can do no wrong. Everywhere he goes, it doesn't matter what he says or does – he gets away with it."

== Electoral record ==
Croydon Council Election 2018: Waddon ward (3 seats)
Party	Candidate	Votes	%	±%
Labour	Robert William Canning	2,209	17.04	+2.81
Labour	Joy Prince	2,134	16.46	+2.54
Labour	Andrew John Pelling	2,103	16.22	+2.2
Conservative	Alessia Cesana	1,683	12.98	−0.07
Conservative	Luke Springthorpe	1,645	12.69	+0.41
Conservative	Donald Osaro Ekekhomen	1,622	12.51	+1.18
Green	Nicholas Sheridan Barnett	357	2.75	+0.40
Green	Grace Onions	326	2.51	+0.39
Green	Andy Ellis	260	2.01	+0.67
Liberal Democrats	Yusuf Ali Osman	188	1.45	+0.02
Liberal Democrats	Karen Lesley Townsend	169	1.30	+0.28
Liberal Democrats	Alaric Taylor	145	1.12	+1.12
Unity in Action	Marianne Bowness	63	0.49	+0.49
Unity in Action	Winston T. McKenzie	59	0.46	+0.46
Majority		526	4.06	
Majority		451	3.48	
Majority		420	3.24	
Turnout		4,563	37.17	
Labour hold		Swing	1.44	
Labour hold		Swing	1.31	
Labour hold		Swing	1.14	

By-election 2016: Witney
Party	Candidate	Votes	%	±%
Conservative	Robert Courts	17,313	45.0	−15.2
Liberal Democrats	Liz Leffman	11,611	30.2	+23.4
Labour	Duncan Enright	5,765	15.0	−2.2
Green	Larry Sanders	1,363	3.5	−1.6
UKIP	Dickie Bird	1,354	3.5	−5.7
NHA	Helen Salisbury	433	1.1	0.0
Independent	Daniel Skidmore	151	0.4	N/A
Monster Raving Loony	Mad Hatter	129	0.3	N/A
Independent	Nicholas Ward	93	0.2	N/A
Bus-Pass Elvis	David Bishop	61	0.2	N/A
Eccentric Party	Lord Toby Jug	59	0.2	N/A
English Democrat	Winston T. McKenzie	52	0.1	N/A
One Love Party	Emilia Arno	44	0.1	N/A
Independent	Adam Knight	27	0.1	N/A
Majority		5,702	14.8	−28.2
Turnout		38,455	46.8	−26.5
Conservative hold		Swing	-19.3	

By-Election: West Thornton Ward, London Borough of Croydon, 5 May 2016
Party	Candidate	Votes	%	±%
Labour	Callton Young	3,136	64.7	
Conservative	Scott Roche	989	20.4	
Green	David Beall	289	6.0	
UKIP	Ace Nnorom	145	3.0	
Liberal Democrats	Geoff Morley	140	2.9	
Independence from Europe	Peter Morgan	77	1.6	
English Democrat	Winston T. McKenzie	70	1.4	
Majority		2,147	44.3	
Turnout		4,846	44.0	
Labour hold		Swing		

Summary of 5 May 2016 Mayor of London election results
Name	Party	1st Preference Votes	%	2nd Preference Votes	%	Final	%
Sadiq Khan	Labour	1,148,716	44.2 (+3.9)	388,090	17.5	1,536,806	56.9 (+8.4)
Zac Goldsmith	Conservative	909,755	35.0 (-9.0)	250,214	11.3	1,159,969	43.0 (-8.5)
Siân Berry	Green	150,673	5.8 (+1.3)	468,318	21.2	N/A	
Caroline Pidgeon	Liberal Democrat	120,005	4.6 (+0.4)	335,931	15.2	N/A	
Peter Whittle	UKIP	94,373	3.6 (+1.6)	223,253	10.1	N/A	
Sophie Walker	Women's Equality Party	53,055	2.0 (-)	198,720	9.0	N/A	
George Galloway	Respect	37,007	1.4 (-)	117,080	5.3	N/A	
Paul Golding	Britain First	31,372	1.2 (-)	73,883	3.3	N/A	
Lee Harris	CISTA	20,537	0.8 (-)	67,495	3.1	N/A	
David Furness	BNP	13,325	0.5 (-)	36,168	1.6	N/A	
Prince Zylinski	Independent	13,202	0.5 (-)	24,646	1.1	N/A	
Ankit Love	One Love	4,941	0.2 (-)	28,920	1.3	N/A	
Winston T. McKenzie	English Democrats	Disqualified from ballot paper	N/A	N/A	N/A	N/A	

General Election 2015: Croydon North
Party	Candidate	Votes	%	±%
Labour Co-op	Steve Reed	33,513	62.6	+6.6
Conservative	Vidhi Mohan	12,149	22.7	−1.4
UKIP	Winston T. McKenzie	2,899	5.4	+3.7
Green	Shasha Khan	2,515	4.7	+2.7
Liberal Democrats	Joanna Corbin	1,919	3.6	−10.4
TUSC	Glen Hart	261	0.5	+0.5
Independent	Lee Berks	141	0.3	+0.3
Communist	Ben Stevenson	125	0.2	−0.1
Majority		21,364	39.9	−8
Turnout		53,522	62.3	+35.77
Labour hold		Swing	+4.0	

2014 United Kingdom local elections, South Norwood Ward, London Borough of Croydon, 22 May 2014
Party	Candidate	Votes	%	±%
Labour	Kathy Bee	2,303		+4.8
Labour	Jane Avis	2,211		+2.3
Labour	Wayne James Patrick Lawlor	1,971		+3.0
Conservative	Jonathan Thomas Ewan Cope	909		−6.9
Conservative	Matthew Edward O'Flynn	739		−6.2
Conservative	Rosina Rachel Mat St. James	731		−6.0
Green	Graham Ronald Geoffrey Jones	494		+5.6
Green	Andrew Howard Ellis	486		−0.2
UKIP	Winston T. McKenzie	480		+6.8
UKIP	Anette Reid	437		
UKIP	Barry Slayford	437		
Green	James Anthony Seyforth	359		+2.9
Liberal Democrats	Robert James Brown	314		−11.6
Liberal Democrats	Kimberley Erica Sarah Reid	220		−12.7
Liberal Democrats	Jonathan Douglas Regan	177		−13.7
Majority		1,042; 240; 92		
Turnout			28.0	
Labour hold		Swing		

Croydon North by-election, 30 November 2012
Party	Candidate	Votes	%	±%
Labour	Steve Reed	15,892	64.7	+8.7
Conservative	Andrew Stranack	4,137	16.8	−7.3
UKIP	Winston T. McKenzie	1,400	5.7	+4.0
Liberal Democrats	Marisha Ray	860	3.5	−10.5
Green	Shasha Khan	855	3.5	+1.5
Respect	Lee Jasper	707	2.9	+2.4
CPA	Stephen Hammond	192	0.8	N/A
National Front	Richard Edmonds	161	0.7	N/A
Communist	Ben Stevenson	119	0.5	+0.2
Monster Raving Loony	John Cartwright	110	0.4	N/A
Nine Eleven Was An Inside Job	Simon Lane	66	0.3	N/A
Young People's Party	Robin Smith	63	0.3	N/A
Majority				
Rejected ballots				
Turnout			26.53%	
Labour hold		Swing		

London Assembly election, 3 May 2012: Croydon and Sutton
Party	Candidate	Votes	%	±%
Conservative	Steve O'Connell	60,152	39.1	−4.2
Labour	Louisa Woodley	50,734	33.0	+13.8
Liberal Democrats	Abigail Lock	21,889	14.2	−4.1
UKIP	Winston T. McKenzie	10,757	7.0	+1.6
Green	Gordon Ross	10,287	6.7	+1.6
Majority		9,418	6.1	−18.0
Total formal votes		153,819	98.6	
Informal votes		2,165	1.4	
Turnout		155,984	35.7	−13.3

UKIP primary for London Mayoral candidate, 5 September 2011
Party	Candidate	Votes	%	±%
UKIP	Lawrence Webb	Undisclosed	42.0	N/A
UKIP	David Coburn	Undisclosed	29.0	N/A
UKIP	Mick McGough	Undisclosed	7.4	N/A
UKIP	Winston McKenzie	Undisclosed	7.4	N/A
UKIP	Michael Corby	Undisclosed	Undisclosed	N/A
UKIP	Paul Oakley	Undisclosed	Undisclosed	N/A

UK Independence Party Leadership election, 2010
Candidate	Votes		%
✓ Nigel Farage	6,085		60.5%
Tim Congdon	2,037		20.3%
David Campbell Bannerman	1,404		14.0%
Winston McKenzie	530		5.3%
Turnout		10,056	65.1%
Nigel Farage elected as Leader ✓

General Election, 6 May 2010: Tottenham
Party	Candidate	Votes	%	±%
Labour	David Lammy	24,128	59.3	+1.4
Liberal Democrats	David Schmitz	7,197	17.7	+0.9
Conservative	Sean Sullivan	6,064	14.9	+1.4
TUSC	Jenny Sutton	1,057	2.6	N/A
Green	Anne Gray	980	2.4	−2.2
UKIP	Winston T. McKenzie	466	1.1	N/A
Independent People Together	Neville Watson	265	0.7	N/A
Christian	Abimbola Kadara	262	0.6	N/A
Independent	Sheik Thompson	143	0.4	N/A
Independent	Errol Carr	125	0.3	N/A
Majority		16,931	41.6	+0.5
Turnout		40,687	58.2	+10.4
Labour hold		Swing	+0.2	

Summary of 1 May 2008 Mayor of London election results
Name	Party	1st Preference Votes	%	2nd Preference Votes	%	Final	%
Boris Johnson	Conservative	1,043,761	43.2 (+14.1)	257,292	12.9	1,168,738	53.2 (+8.6)
Ken Livingstone	Labour	893,877	37.0 (+0.2)	303,198	15.1	1,028,966	46.8 (-8.6)
Brian Paddick	Liberal Democrat	236,685	9.8 (-5.5)	641,412	32.0	N/A	
Siân Berry	Green	77,374	3.2 (+0.1)	331,727	16.6	N/A	
Richard Barnbrook	British National Party	69,710	2.9 (-0.2)	128,609	6.4	N/A	
Alan Craig	Christian Peoples Alliance	39,249	1.6 (-0.6)	80,140	4.0	N/A	
Gerard Batten	UKIP	22,422	0.9 (-5.3)	113,651	5.7	N/A	
Lindsey German	Left List	16,796	0.7	35,057	1.7	N/A	
Matt O'Connor (withdrew from contest)	English Democrats	10,695	0.4	73,538	3.7	N/A	
Winston T. McKenzie	Independent	5,389	0.2	38,854	1.9	N/A	

Veritas leadership election, 15 September 2005
Party	Candidate	Votes	%	±%
Veritas	Patrick Eston	610	52.2	N/A
Veritas	Colin Brown	390	33.4	N/A
Veritas	Winston T. McKenzie	168	14.4	N/A
Majority		220	18.8	N/A
Turnout		1,168	Unknown	Unknown
Veritas hold		Swing		

Fieldway Ward By-Election, London Borough of Croydon, 16 June 2005
Party	Candidate	Votes	%	±%
Labour	Simon A. Hall	993	52.4	−13.0
Conservative	Anthony Pearson	714	37.6	+3.0
Liberal Democrats	Simon E. Hargrave	136	7.2	+7.2
Independent	Winston T. McKenzie	47	2.5	+2.5
Monster Raving Loony	John S. Cartwright	6	0.3	+0.3
Majority		279	14.8	
Turnout		1,896	28.0	
Labour hold		Swing		

General Election, 5 May 2005: Croydon North
Party	Candidate	Votes	%	±%
Labour	Malcolm Wicks	23,555	53.7	−9.8
Conservative	Tariq Ahmad	9,667	22.0	−1.3
Liberal Democrats	Adrian Gee-Turner	7,590	17.2	+6.8
Green	Shasha Khan	1,248	2.8	N/A
UKIP	Henry Pearce	770	1.8	+0.4
Croydon Pensions Alliance	Peter Gibson	394	0.9	N/A
Veritas	Winston T. McKenzie	324	0.7	N/A
Independent	Farhan Rasheed	197	0.4	N/A
The People's Choice	Michelle Chambers	132	0.3	N/A
Majority		13,888	31.7	
Turnout		43,877	52.3	−0.9
Labour hold		Swing	−4.3	

Brent East by-election, 18 September 2003
Party	Candidate	Votes	%	±%
Liberal Democrats	Sarah Teather	8,158	39.12	+28.5
Labour	Robert Evans	7,040	33.76	–29.4
Conservative	Uma Fernandes	3,368	16.15	–2.0
Green	Noel Lynch	638	3.06	–1.6
Socialist Alliance	Brian Butterworth	361	1.73	N/A
Public Services Not War	Fawzi Ibrahim	219	1.05	N/A
Independent	Winston T. McKenzie	197	0.94	N/A
Independent	Kelly McBride	189	0.91	N/A
Independent	Harold Immanuel	188	0.9	N/A
UKIP	Brian Hall	140	0.67	0.1
Socialist Labour	Iris Cremer	111	0.53	–0.8
Independent	Neil Walsh	101	0.48	N/A
Monster Raving Loony	Alan Hope	59	0.28	N/A
No label	Aaron Barschak	37	0.18	N/A
No label	Jitendra Bardwaj	35	0.17	N/A
www.xat.org	Rainbow George Weiss	11	0.05	N/A
Majority		1,118	5.36	
Turnout		20,752	36.2	–15.7
Liberal Democrats gain from Labour		Swing	+29.0	
