= 2026 West Oxfordshire District Council election =

2026 English local government election

- 7 May 2026

16 out of 49 seats to West Oxfordshire District Council 25 seats needed for a majority
- Registered: 58,557
- Turnout: 26,919; 46.0%
	First party	Second party	Third party
Leader	Andy Graham	Michele Mead	Duncan Enright
Party	Liberal Democrats	Conservative	Labour
Last election	21 seats, 30.1%	13 seats, 34.0%	11 seats, 23.3%
Seats before	21	13	10
Seats won	7	7	0
Seats after	20	16	8
Seat change	▼1	▲3	▼2
Popular vote	8,730	8,154	1,893
Percentage	32.5%	30.4%	7.1%
Swing	▲2.4%	▼3.6%	▼16.2%
	Fourth party	Fifth party
Leader	Rosie Pearson	None
Party	Green	Reform
Last election	4 seats, 10.9%	0 seats, 0.9%
Seats before	4	1
Seats won	1	1
Seats after	4	1
Seat change	Steady	Steady
Popular vote	2,559	5,456
Percentage	9.5%	20.3%
Swing	▼1.4%	▲19.4%
- Winner of each seat at the 2026 West Oxfordshire District Council election.
Leader before election
Andy Graham
Liberal Democrats
No overall control (Note: Liberal Democrats–Labour–Green coalition)
Leader after election
Andy Graham
Liberal Democrats
No overall control (Note: Liberal Democrats–Labour–Green coalition)

The 2026 West Oxfordshire District Council election was held on 7 May 2026, alongside the other local elections across the United Kingdom being held on the same day, to elect 16 of 49 members of West Oxfordshire District Council in Oxfordshire, England.

Prior to the election, the council was under no overall control, being run by a coalition of the Liberal Democrats, Labour and the Green Party, led by Liberal Democrat councillor Andy Graham. The election saw the council remain under no overall control. The same three parties agreed to continue running the council in coalition after the election.

Due to ongoing local government reorganisation, this will be the final election to West Oxfordshire District Council before it is abolished and replaced by a successor unitary authority. Elections to the successor authority are due to take place in 2027.

== Summary ==
=== Background ===
In 2024, the council stayed under no overall control.

=== Council composition ===
After 2024 election		Before 2026 election	
Party	Seats	Party	Seats
Liberal Democrats	21	Liberal Democrats	21
Conservative	13	Conservative	13
Labour	11	Labour	10
Green	3	Green	3
Reform	0	Reform	1

Changes 2024–2026:

- September 2024: Rizvana Poole (Labour) resigns – by-election held November 2024
- November 2024: Mike Baggaley (Liberal Democrats) gains by-election from Labour
- March 2025: Charlie Maynard (Liberal Democrats) resigns – by-election held May 2025
- May 2025: Sandra Cosier (Liberal Democrats) wins by-election
- July 2025: Natalie King (Liberal Democrats) suspended from party
- February 2026: Natalie King (Independent) joins Reform

=== Election result ===
2026 West Oxfordshire District Council election
Party	This election				Full council			This election		
Party	Candidates	Seats	Net	Seats %	Other	Total	Total %	Votes	Votes %	+/−
Liberal Democrats	16	7	▼1	43.8	13	20	45.4	8,730	32.5	+2.4
Conservative	16	7	▲3	43.8	4	11	25.0	8,154	30.4	–3.6
Labour	16	0	▼2	0.0	8	8	18.2	1,893	7.1	–16.2
Green	16	1	Steady	6.3	3	4	9.0	2,559	9.5	–1.4
Reform	16	1	Steady	6.3	0	1	2.3	5,456	20.3	+19.4
Independent	1	0	Steady	0.0	0	0	0.0	58	0.2	–0.2

The council remained under no overall control after the election and the same coalition continued to form the council's administration.

== Incumbents ==
Ward	Incumbent councillor	Party	Re-standing
Ascott & Shipton	David Cooper	Conservative	No
Bampton & Clanfield	Alaric Smith	Liberal Democrats	Yes
Brize Norton & Shilton	Rosie Pearson	Green	Yes
Burford	Hugo Ashton	Liberal Democrats	No
Carterton North East	Martin McBride	Conservative	No
Carterton North West	Natalie King (Note: Originally elected as a Liberal Democrat, but subsequently left the party to sit as an independent and subsequently joined Reform.)	Reform	Yes (Note: Standing in Carterton South ward.)
Carterton South	Nick Leverton	Conservative	No
Chipping Norton	Mike Baggaley (Note: Elected at the 2024 Chipping Norton by-election.)	Liberal Democrats	No
Ducklington	Adrian Walsh	Conservative	No
Eynsham & Cassington	Carl Rylett	Liberal Democrats	Yes
Freeland & Hanborough	Lidia Arciszewska	Liberal Democrats	Yes
Standlake, Aston & Stanton Harcourt	Sandra Cosier (Note: Elected at the 2024 Standlake, Aston & Stanton Harcourt by-election.)	Liberal Democrats	Yes
The Bartons	David Jackson	Liberal Democrats	Yes
Witney East	Ruth Smith	Labour Co-op	Yes
Witney South	Michael Brooker	Labour Co-op	Yes
Woodstock & Bladon	Julian Cooper	Liberal Democrats	No

== Ward results ==
=== Ascott & Shipton ===
Ascott & Shipton
Party	Candidate	Votes	%	±%
Liberal Democrats	Jan Lund	444	45.9	+4.4
Conservative	Ed Boanas	343	35.5	–6.5
Reform	Nigel Walker	111	11.5	N/A
Green	Liz Reason	47	4.9	N/A
Labour	Robin Puttick	22	2.3	–14.2
Majority		101	10.4	+9.9
Turnout		970	54.7	+3.3
Registered electors		1,773		
Liberal Democrats gain from Conservative		Swing	▲5.5	

=== Bampton & Clanfield ===
Bampton & Clanfield
Party	Candidate	Votes	%	±%
Liberal Democrats	Alaric Smith*	706	40.1	–6.7
Conservative	Ted Fenton	622	35.3	–9.1
Reform	Simon Taylor	320	18.2	N/A
Green	Phil Evans	85	4.8	–0.1
Labour	Yvonne Robineau	29	1.6	–2.3
Majority		84	4.8	+2.4
Turnout		1,767	49.7	+9.1
Registered electors		3,553		
Liberal Democrats hold		Swing	▲1.2	

=== Brize Norton & Shilton ===
Brize Norton & Shilton
Party	Candidate	Votes	%	±%
Green	Rosie Pearson*	335	29.8	–24.6
Conservative	David Cooper	269	23.9	–21.7
Liberal Democrats	Toyah Overton	256	22.8	N/A
Reform	Joseph Long	248	22.1	N/A
Labour	Diane Newsham	16	1.4	N/A
Majority		66	5.9	–2.9
Turnout		1,126	44.3	+7.1
Registered electors		2,543		
Green hold		Swing	▼1.5	

=== Burford ===
Burford
Party	Candidate	Votes	%	±%
Conservative	Nick Field-Johnson	370	39.5	+13.3
Liberal Democrats	Leslie Channon	330	35.3	–31.0
Reform	James Poxon	189	20.2	N/A
Green	Natalie Baker	39	4.2	N/A
Labour	Nathaniel Miles	8	0.9	–6.6
Majority		40	4.2	N/A
Turnout		938	53.4	+5.3
Registered electors		1,757		
Conservative gain from Liberal Democrats		Swing	▲22.2	

=== Carterton North East ===
Carterton North East
Party	Candidate	Votes	%	±%
Conservative	Simon Watson	619	41.3	+6.3
Reform	Brian Barrett	345	23.0	N/A
Liberal Democrats	Gill Stevenson	324	21.6	–27.9
Green	Dave Horsley	116	7.7	N/A
Independent	Barry Ingleton	58	3.9	N/A
Labour	Robert Steere	38	2.5	–7.9
Majority		274	18.3	N/A
Turnout		1,504	35.2	+9.6
Registered electors		4,269		
Conservative hold				

=== Carterton North West ===
Carterton North West
Party	Candidate	Votes	%	±%
Reform	Sarah Evans	600	38.3	N/A
Conservative	Tom Cripps	489	31.2	–4.3
Liberal Democrats	Andrew Walton	272	17.4	–28.6
Green	Hemashu Kotecha	152	9.7	+5.4
Labour Co-op	Dave Wesson	52	3.3	–4.6
Majority		111	7.1	N/A
Turnout		1,573	38.7	+7.9
Registered electors		4,067		
Reform hold				

=== Carterton South ===
Carterton South
Party	Candidate	Votes	%	±%
Conservative	Tammy Abarno	518	37.5	–5.9
Reform	Natalie King*	440	31.8	N/A
Liberal Democrats	Gemma Yallop	293	21.2	–18.5
Green	Tony Barrett	85	6.2	N/A
Labour	Kate England	46	3.3	–7.1
Majority		78	5.7	+2.0
Turnout		1,387	37.5	+7.1
Registered electors		3,697		
Conservative hold				

=== Chipping Norton ===
Chipping Norton
Party	Candidate	Votes	%	±%
Liberal Democrats	Sandra Coleman	745	30.1	+23.5
Reform	Darren Marshall	622	25.1	N/A
Green	Claire Lasko	409	16.5	+5.2
Conservative	Caspar Morris	364	14.7	–6.0
Labour Co-op	Sian O'Neill	338	13.6	–47.7
Majority		123	5.0	N/A
Turnout		2,485	43.7	
Registered electors		5,682		
Liberal Democrats hold				

=== Ducklington ===
Duckington
Party	Candidate	Votes	%	±%
Conservative	Liam MacKenzie	470	41.9	+0.1
Liberal Democrats	Ben Morel-Allen	309	27.6	–13.3
Reform	Richard Langridge	265	23.6	N/A
Green	Pennt Ponton	44	3.9	N/A
Labour	Georgia Meadows	33	2.9	–14.4
Majority		161	14.3	+13.4
Turnout		1,123	50.5	+9.6
Registered electors		2,225		
Conservative hold		Swing	▲6.7	

=== Eynsham & Cassington ===
Eynsham & Cassington
Party	Candidate	Votes	%	±%
Liberal Democrats	Carl Rylett*	1,156	46.5	–3.3
Reform	Michael Grant	466	18.7	N/A
Conservative	Adam Compton	417	16.8	–6.0
Green	Penny Garner	337	13.5	+5.5
Labour	Nick Melliss	112	4.5	–15.0
Majority		690	27.8	+0.8
Turnout		2,494	48.6	
Registered electors		5,132		
Liberal Democrats hold				

=== Freeland & Hanborough ===
Freeland & Hanborough
Party	Candidate	Votes	%	±%
Conservative	Toby Morris	808	39.7	+0.3
Liberal Democrats	Lidia Arciszewska*	785	38.6	+1.1
Reform	Ann Russell	237	11.6	N/A
Green	Miranda Shaw	151	7.4	+1.4
Labour	James Smith	54	2.7	–7.5
Majority		23	1.1	–0.8
Turnout		2,039	50.2	
Registered electors		4,064		
Conservative gain from Liberal Democrats		Swing	▼0.4	

=== Standlake, Aston & Stanton Harcourt ===
Standlake, Aston & Stanton Harcourt
Party	Candidate	Votes	%	±%
Liberal Democrats	Sandra Cosier*	981	49.8	–1.5
Conservative	Lysette Nicholls	516	26.2	–13.9
Reform	Peter Mildenhall	363	18.4	N/A
Green	Daniel Eisenhandler	81	4.1	+1.2
Labour	Sachin Thorogood	30	1.5	–4.3
Majority		465	23.6	+12.4
Turnout		1,975	51.4	
Registered electors		3,845		
Liberal Democrats hold		Swing	▲6.2	

=== The Bartons ===
The Bartons
Party	Candidate	Votes	%	±%
Liberal Democrats	Dave Jackson*	435	52.4	–22.0
Conservative	Mandi Tandi	250	30.1	+8.2
Reform	Matt Sydenham	117	14.1	N/A
Green	Mary Robertson	15	1.8	–1.9
Labour Co-op	Ian Hames	13	1.6	N/A
Majority		185	22.3	–30.2
Turnout		832	53.7	+6.6
Registered electors		1,549		
Liberal Democrats hold		Swing	▼15.1	

=== Witney East ===
Witney East
Party	Candidate	Votes	%	±%
Conservative	James Robertshaw	978	34.9	–6.3
Liberal Democrats	George Brown	633	22.6	+14.5
Labour Co-op	Ruth Smith*	574	20.5	–24.5
Reform	Lawrence Harr	398	14.2	N/A
Green	Alex Houlton	223	7.9	+2.2
Majority		315	11.1	N/A
Turnout		2,814	48.7	
Registered electors		5,782		
Conservative gain from Labour Co-op		Swing	▼11.0	

=== Witney South ===
Witney South
Party	Candidate	Votes	%	±%
Conservative	Jack Treloar	658	32.1	–6.8
Reform	Ross Kelly	474	23.1	N/A
Labour Co-op	Mike Brooker*	427	20.8	–21.5
Liberal Democrats	Peter Whitten	298	14.5	+7.6
Green	Harriet Marshall	194	9.5	+3.6
Majority		184	9.0	N/A
Turnout		2,044	42.1	
Registered electors		4,856		
Conservative gain from Labour Co-op				

=== Woodstock & Bladon ===
Woodstock & Bladon
Party	Candidate	Votes	%	±%
Liberal Democrats	Hannah Massie	772	41.9	–1.2
Conservative	Eric Sukumaran	463	25.1	–8.3
Reform	James Gibbs	261	14.2	N/A
Green	Barry Wheatley	246	13.3	+7.5
Labour	Sammy McDonald	101	5.5	–12.2
Majority		309	16.8	+7.1
Turnout		1,848	49.1	
Registered electors		3,763		
Liberal Democrats hold		Swing	▲3.6	
