= Larry Sanders =

Larry Sanders may refer to:

- Larry Sanders (politician) (born 1935), American-born British academic, social worker, Green Party activist, and brother of Bernie Sanders
- L.V. (singer) (Larry Sanders, born 1957), American rhythm and blues singer
- Larry Sanders (basketball) (born 1988), American professional basketball player
- Larry Sanders, the title character of the TV series The Larry Sanders Show

== See also ==
- Lawrence Sanders, American novelist and short story writer
- Barry Sanders (born 1968), American professional football running back with the Detroit Lions
