= 2016 Witney by-election =

2016 UK Parliamentary by-election

- 20 October 2016

Witney constituency
- Turnout: 46.8%
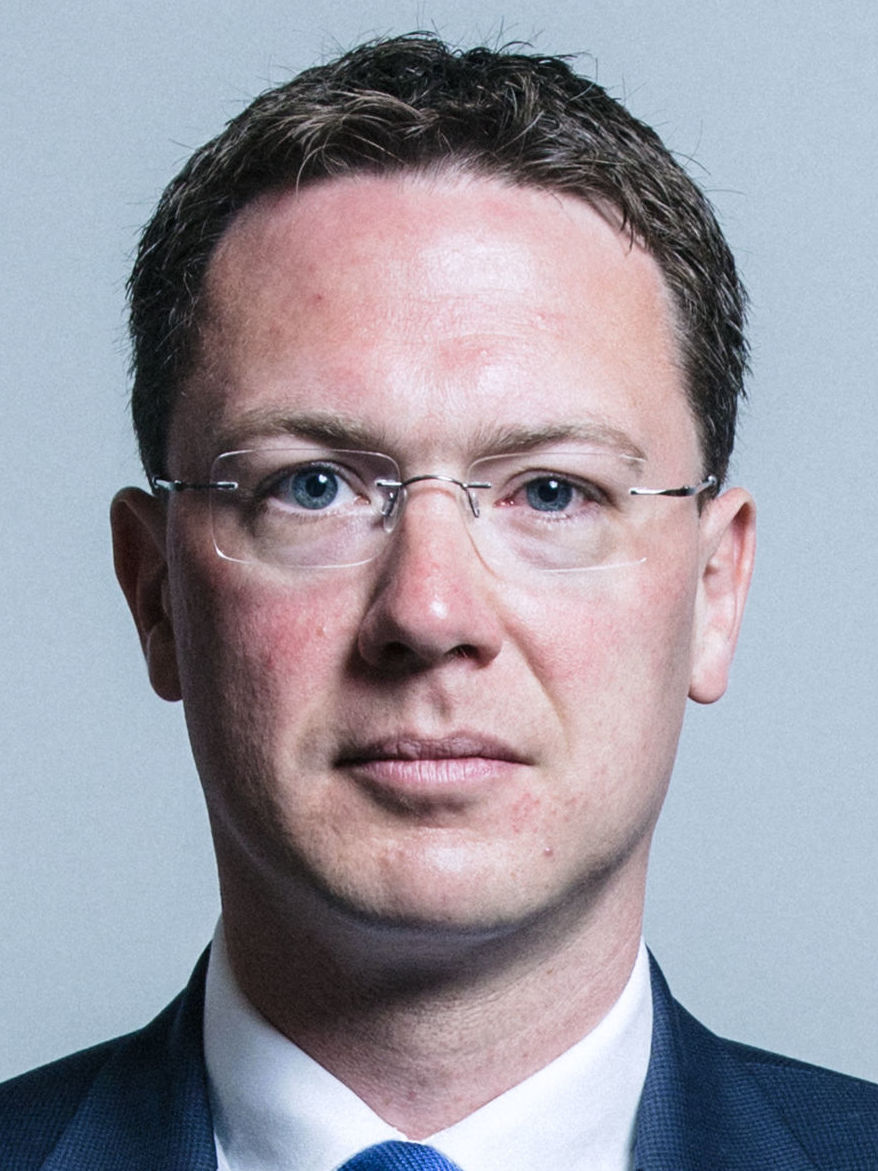

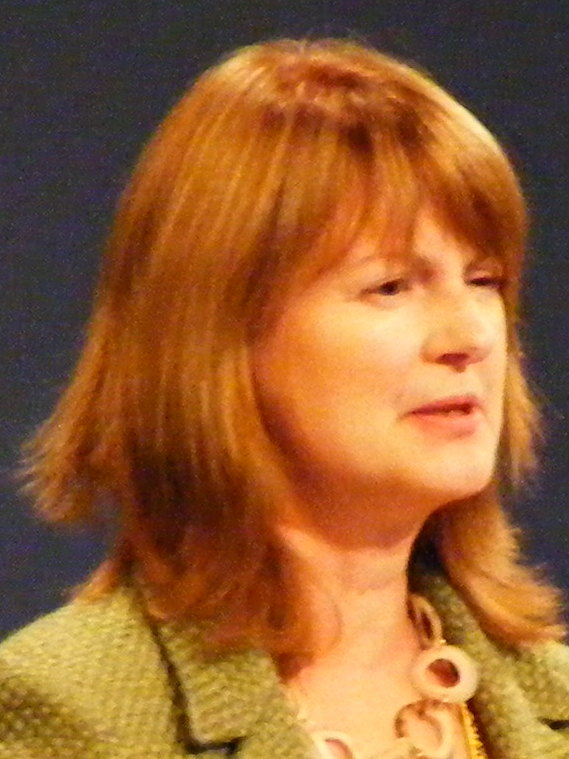
	First party	Second party	Third party
			Lab
Candidate	Robert Courts	Liz Leffman	Duncan Enright
Party	Conservative	Liberal Democrats	Labour
Popular vote	17,313	11,611	5,765
Percentage	45.0%	30.2%	15.0%
Swing	▼15.2 pp	▲23.4 pp	▼2.2 pp
MP before election
David Cameron
Conservative
Elected MP
Robert Courts
Conservative

A by-election for the United Kingdom parliamentary constituency of Witney was held on 20 October 2016, triggered by the resignation of the incumbent Conservative Party Member of Parliament (MP) and recently-departed Prime Minister David Cameron. It was won by the Conservative candidate Robert Courts with a reduced vote share, and the Liberal Democrats came in second with an increase in vote share of 23.4 percentage points.

The 2016 Batley and Spen by-election, held following the murder of Jo Cox, took place on the same day.

== Background ==
David Cameron had been the Conservative Party MP for the seat since the 2001 general election, becoming leader of the Conservative Party in 2005 and Prime Minister of the United Kingdom in 2010. Following the Leave result in the referendum on the United Kingdom's membership of the European Union that Cameron had campaigned against, he resigned as Prime Minister and leader of the Conservative Party, being replaced by Theresa May. In September 2016 he announced his resignation as an MP, saying he did not want to be a distraction to May's premiership.

== Candidates ==
The Conservatives picked Robert Courts, a barrister and West Oxfordshire District Councillor since 2014, from a shortlist of three candidates; he defeated Natasha Whitmill, a former aide to Cameron, and John Cotton, the leader of South Oxfordshire District Council. Though Witney voted in favour of remain in the EU referendum on 23 June 2016, Courts is a "Brexiter", which means that he supports Brexit.

The Labour Party selected Duncan Enright as their candidate. He serves as a West Oxfordshire District Councillor and stood in Witney at the 2015 general election, finishing second behind Cameron.

The Liberal Democrats selected Liz Leffman, a West Oxfordshire District Councillor (for Charlbury and Finstock) and local businesswoman, as the party's candidate. She stood in Witney in the 2005 general election, finishing second to Cameron.

The UK Independence Party named Kenrick "Dickie" Bird. He served in the army in Oxfordshire's local Regiment, The Royal Green Jackets, before becoming Head Porter at Oriel College, Oxford, and stood in Banbury in 2015, coming third.

The Green Party named Larry Sanders, a former Oxfordshire County Councillor and brother of US Senator Bernie Sanders. He came fifth in the 2015 general election in the neighbouring constituency of Oxford West and Abingdon.

The National Health Action Party (NHA) selected Dr Helen Salisbury, a GP and lecturer at Oxford University Medical School. Salisbury was their candidate in Oxford West and Abingdon at the 2015 general election.

Winston McKenzie, a former professional boxer and a perennial candidate, was named as the candidate of the English Democrats. He came third in Croydon North at the previous general election.

Independent candidate Adam Knight endorsed the Liberal Democrat candidate, Leffman, during the campaign.

Overall, fourteen candidates stood in the by-election.

== Result ==
By-election 2016: Witney
Party	Candidate	Votes	%	±%
Conservative	Robert Courts	17,313	45.0	–15.2
Liberal Democrats	Liz Leffman	11,611	30.2	+23.4
Labour	Duncan Enright	5,765	15.0	–2.2
Green	Larry Sanders	1,363	3.5	–1.6
UKIP	Dickie Bird	1,354	3.5	–5.7
NHA	Helen Salisbury	433	1.1	0.0
Independent	Daniel Skidmore	151	0.4	New
Monster Raving Loony	Mad Hatter	129	0.3	New
Independent	Nicholas Ward	93	0.2	New
Bus-Pass Elvis	David Bishop	61	0.2	New
Eccentric Party	Lord Toby Jug	59	0.2	New
English Democrat	Winston McKenzie	52	0.1	New
One Love	Emilia Arno	44	0.1	New
Independent	Adam Knight	27	0.1	New
Majority		5,702	14.8	–28.2
Turnout		38,455	46.8	–26.5
Conservative hold		Swing	–19.3	

The Liberal Democrats recorded their highest share of the vote in Witney since 1983.

== Previous results in constituency ==
=== 2015 election result ===
General election 2015: Witney
Party	Candidate	Votes	%	±%
Conservative	David Cameron	35,201	60.2	+1.4
Labour	Duncan Enright	10,046	17.2	+4.2
UKIP	Simon Strutt	5,352	9.2	+5.7
Liberal Democrats	Andy Graham	3,953	6.8	–12.7
Green	Stuart MacDonald	2,970	5.1	+0.9
NHA	Clive Peedell	616	1.1	New
Wessex Regionalist	Colin Bex	110	0.2	+0.1
Independent	Christopher Tompson	94	0.2	New
Reduce VAT in Sport	Vivien Saunders	56	0.1	New
Give Me Back Elmo	Bobby Smith	37	0.1	New
Land Party	Deek Jackson	35	0.1	New
Independent	Nathan Handley	12	0.02	New
Majority		25,155	43.0	+3.6
Turnout		58,482	73.3	0.0
Conservative hold		Swing	–1.4	

=== 2016 EU referendum result ===
The constituency is co-terminous with the district of West Oxfordshire which, in the EU referendum on 23 June 2016, voted in favour of remain.

	Turnout	Remain votes	Leave votes	Remain %	Leave %
West Oxfordshire	79.72%	35,236	30,435	53.6%	46.4%

== See also ==
- List of United Kingdom by-elections (2010–present)
- 2007 Sedgefield by-election
