= 2022 West Oxfordshire District Council election =

2022 UK local government election

Map showing the results of the 2022 West Oxfordshire District Council election

The 2022 West Oxfordshire District Council election took place on 5 May 2022 to elect members of West Oxfordshire District Council in Oxfordshire, England. One-third of the council was up for election and the Conservative Party lost control of the council to no overall control.

== Results summary ==
2022 West Oxfordshire District Council election
Party	This election			Full council			This election		
Party	Seats	Net	Seats %	Other	Total	Total %	Votes	Votes %	+/−
Conservative	4	▼5	25.0	19	23	46.9	7,964	37.4	-4.7
Liberal Democrats	8	▲4	50.0	6	14	28.6	7,681	36.0	+12.0
Labour	3	Steady	18.8	5	8	16.3	4,105	19.3	-2.9
Green	1	▲1	6.3	1	2	4.1	1,367	6.4	-4.6
Independent	0	Steady	0.0	2	2	4.1	164	0.8	+0.3
Heritage	0	Steady	0.0	0	0	0.0	39	0.2	New

The votes were counted at the Windrush Leisure Centre in Witney. The turnout was given as 39 percent. Following these election results the Conservatives lost control of West Oxfordshire after being in charge for 22 years. The deputy leader of the council lost his seat.

== Ward results ==
=== Ascott and Shipton ===
Ascott and Shipton
Party	Candidate	Votes	%	±%
Conservative	David Cooper	368	42.0	+3.1
Liberal Democrats	Timothy Sumner	364	41.5	−11.3
Labour Co-op	Sue Richards	145	16.5	+9.9
Majority		4	0.5	
Turnout		881	51.4	
Conservative gain from Liberal Democrats		Swing	▲7.2	

=== Bampton and Clanfield ===
Bampton and Clanfield
Party	Candidate	Votes	%	±%
Liberal Democrats	Alaric Smith	647	46.7	+20.2
Conservative	Rupert Dent	606	43.7	−19.0
Labour	Nathaniel Miles	71	5.1	−5.7
Green	Alma Tumilowicz	62	4.5	N/A
Majority		41	3.0	
Turnout		1,389	42.4	
Liberal Democrats gain from Conservative		Swing	▲19.6	

=== Brize Norton and Shilton ===
Brize Norton and Shilton
Party	Candidate	Votes	%	±%
Green	Rosie Pearson	383	54.4	N/A
Conservative	Alex Postan	321	45.6	−26.3
Majority		62	8.8	
Turnout		713	37.2	
Green gain from Conservative		Swing	N/A	

=== Burford ===
Burford
Party	Candidate	Votes	%	±%
Liberal Democrats	Hugo Ashton	511	66.3	+49.5
Conservative	Craig Brown	202	26.2	−48.8
Labour	George Richmond	58	7.5	−0.7
Majority		309	40.1	
Turnout		774	48.1	
Liberal Democrats gain from Conservative		Swing	▲49.2	

=== Carterton North East ===
Carterton North East
Party	Candidate	Votes	%	±%
Conservative	Martin McBride	428	44.6	−15.2
Liberal Democrats	David Melvin	423	44.1	+33.2
Green	Anthony Barrett	108	11.3	−4.7
Majority		5	0.5	
Turnout		968	23.4	
Conservative hold		Swing	▼24.2	

=== Carterton North West ===
Carterton North West
Party	Candidate	Votes	%	±%
Liberal Democrats	Natalie King	460	38.4	+27.0
Conservative	Kim Wood	455	38.0	−1.9
Independent	Pete Handley	164	13.7	−23.5
Labour Co-op	Dave Wesson	79	6.6	−4.9
Heritage	David Cox	39	3.3	N/A
Majority		5	0.4	
Turnout		1,199	30.7	
Liberal Democrats gain from Conservative		Swing	▲14.5	

=== Carterton South ===
Carterton South
Party	Candidate	Votes	%	±%
Conservative	Nick Leverton	586	65.0	+7.2
Liberal Democrats	Sophie Roell	316	35.0	+21.5
Majority		270	30.0	
Turnout		909	26.8	
Conservative hold		Swing	▼7.2	

=== Chipping Norton ===
Chipping Norton
Party	Candidate	Votes	%	±%
Labour Co-op	Rizvana Poole	1,237	61.0	+6.2
Conservative	Emma Leeming	607	29.9	+1.8
Liberal Democrats	Ivan Aguado	185	9.1	+3.9
Majority		630	31.1	
Turnout		2,055	37.1	
Labour Co-op hold		Swing	▲2.2	

=== Ducklington ===
Ducklington
Party	Candidate	Votes	%	±%
Conservative	Ben Woodruff	344	48.0	−14.0
Labour	Rachel Crouch	285	39.7	+21.4
Green	Carol Cather	88	12.3	N/A
Majority		59	8.3	
Turnout		725	36.0	
Conservative hold		Swing	▼17.7	

=== Eynsham and Cassington ===
Eynsham and Cassington
Party	Candidate	Votes	%	±%
Liberal Democrats	Carl Rylett	1,324	63.1	+7.7
Conservative	Terrel Mollel	460	21.9	−9.3
Labour	Lucy Wallis	178	8.5	+0.9
Green	Celia Kerslake	135	6.4	+0.6
Majority		864	41.2	
Turnout		2,105	41.8	
Liberal Democrats hold		Swing	▲8.5	

=== Freeland and Hanborough ===
Freeland and Hanborough
Party	Candidate	Votes	%	±%
Liberal Democrats	Lidia Arciszewska	872	50.7	+22.8
Conservative	Merilyn Davies	741	43.1	−8.6
Green	Timothy Eden	107	6.2	−0.7
Majority		131	7.6	
Turnout		1,724	43.4	
Liberal Democrats gain from Labour		Swing	▲15.7	

=== Standlake, Aston and Stanton Harcourt ===
Standlake, Aston and Stanton Harcourt
Party	Candidate	Votes	%	±%
Liberal Democrats	Charlie Maynard	1,019	58.0	+23.9
Conservative	Sean Grace	739	42.0	−14.3
Majority		280	16.0	
Turnout		1,767	48.0	
Liberal Democrats gain from Conservative		Swing	▲19.1	

=== The Bartons ===
The Bartons
Party	Candidate	Votes	%	±%
Liberal Democrats	Dave Jackson	543	74.4	+21.4
Conservative	Richard Jackson	160	21.9	−21.0
Green	Frances Mortimer	27	3.7	N/A
Majority		383	52.5	
Turnout		731	47.1	
Liberal Democrats hold		Swing	▲21.2	

=== Witney East ===
Witney East
Party	Candidate	Votes	%	±%
Labour Co-op	Ruth Smith	1,020	47.5	−0.3
Conservative	Toby Morris	773	36.0	+0.7
Liberal Democrats	Hannah Bailey	190	8.8	+4.0
Green	Harriet Kopinska	164	7.6	−4.4
Majority		247	11.5	
Turnout		2,162	38.2	
Labour Co-op hold		Swing	▼0.5	

=== Witney South ===
Witney South
Party	Candidate	Votes	%	±%
Labour Co-op	Michael Brooker	790	46.1	+11.4
Conservative	David Harvey	721	42.1	−2.9
Green	Sandra Simpson	203	11.8	+2.9
Majority		69	4.0	
Turnout		1,722	35.9	
Labour Co-op gain from Conservative		Swing	▲7.2	

Losing Conservative candidate, David Harvey, had been the district councillor for 24 years and was the deputy leader of the council.

=== Woodstock and Bladon ===
Woodstock and Bladon
Party	Candidate	Votes	%	±%
Liberal Democrats	Julian Cooper	827	51.3	+1.3
Conservative	Sharone Parnes	453	28.1	−5.5
Labour	Veronica Oakeshott	242	15.0	+7.3
Green	Barry Wheatley	90	5.6	−3.1
Majority		374	23.2	
Turnout		1,618	46.8	
Liberal Democrats hold		Swing	▲3.4	
