= Larry Sanders (politician) =

American-born British politician (born 1935)

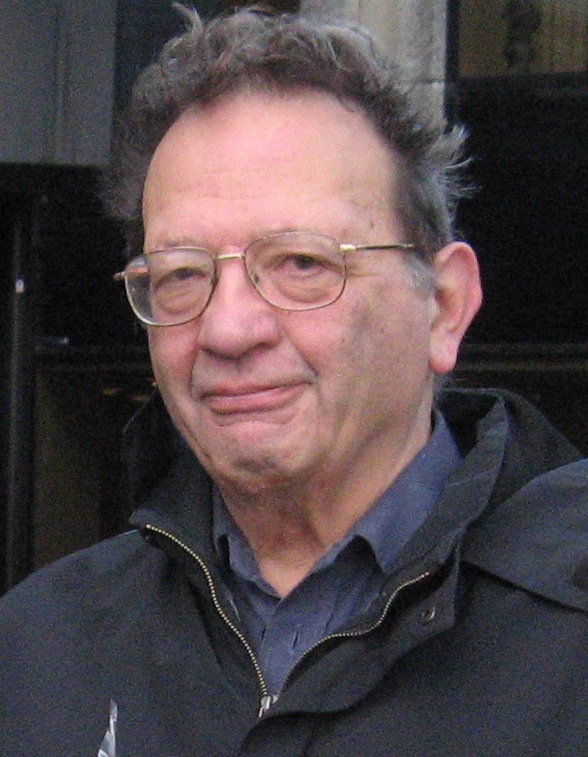
- Sanders in 2008

Spokesperson for Health and Social Care of the Green Party of England and Wales
- In office 11 February 2016 – 7 May 2021
- Leader: Natalie Bennett; Caroline Lucas (co-leader); Jonathan Bartley (co-leader); Siân Berry (co-leader); Carla Denyer (co-leader); Adrian Ramsay (co-leader)
- Preceded by: Jillian Creasy
- Succeeded by: Pallavi Devulapalli

Member of the Oxfordshire County Council from Oxford East
- In office 2005–2013

Personal details
- Born: Lawrence Sanders; 29 April 1935 (age 91) New York City, U.S.
- Party: Green Party of England and Wales (2001–present); Labour (before 2001)
- Spouse: Margaret Sanders (died 1983)
- Domestic partner: Janet Hall (since 1998)
- Children: 2
- Relatives: Bernie Sanders (brother); Jane Sanders (sister-in-law)
- Education: City University of New York, Brooklyn (BA); University of Oxford (MSW); Harvard University (JD)

Lawrence Sanders (born 29 April 1935) is an American-born British academic, social worker, politician, and former Health and Social Care Spokesperson of the Green Party of England and Wales. He is the older brother of Bernie Sanders, United States Senator from Vermont and two-time U.S. presidential candidate.

== Early life, education, and family ==
Larry Sanders was born in Brooklyn, New York City, to Dorothy (née Glassberg) and Eli Sanders. His father was a Polish-Jewish immigrant whose family was killed in the Holocaust, while his mother was born in New York City on 2 October 1912, to Jewish immigrant parents from Radzyń Podlaski, in eastern Poland and Russia. His father immigrated to America in 1921 at age 17, and supported his family by selling paint. Sanders said that when he was a child, his family never lacked food or clothing, but major purchases "like curtains or a rug" were difficult to afford. His mother died on 25 March 1960, at age 47.

Both he and his brother attended James Madison High School in Brooklyn. Sanders has said they were young postwar Jewish radicals but part of the crowd, not yet leaders. Sanders attended Brooklyn College of the City University of New York and obtained a master's degree in social work from the University of Oxford. He also attended Harvard Law School in the 1950s, leaving after two years to care for his sick mother. He returned after 35 years and completed his J.D. degree there in 1994.

Sanders immigrated to the United Kingdom in 1968 or 1969. He became a university lecturer, first at the University of West London and later at Oxford in the Department of Social Administration.

His son, Jacob Edward "Jake" Sanders (born 26 November 1968), was elected to Oxford City Council in 2000 and was a Green Party parliamentary candidate in the Oxford East constituency at the 2005 general election.

== Political career ==
Sanders was active in the Labour Party in Oxford in the 1980s. He left the party in 2001 because he felt that it had moved too far to the right under Tony Blair, and defected to the Green Party.

First elected in 2005, Sanders was a Green Party county councillor representing the East Oxford division in the Oxfordshire County Council until he retired from the Council in 2013. His main focuses in county politics were social and health care services. He resigned from the board of the Oxfordshire & Buckinghamshire Mental Health Partnership NHS Trust in October 2005 in a principled stand amid concerns that proposed cuts to services would leave vulnerable patients at greater risk.

Sanders became chairman of the Oxford Community School's Board of Governors in September 2009, after the previous chairman, Chris Ballinger, and six other board members resigned. In December 2009, the Department for Children, Schools and Families approved Oxfordshire County Council's application to disband the Board of Governors and replace them with an interim executive board. On hearing the decision, Sanders said he was "dreadfully disappointed".

In February 2016, Sanders was appointed Health Spokesperson of the Green Party of England and Wales. He served until May 2021.

Sanders was elected as a pledged delegate for Bernie Sanders to the 2016 Democratic National Convention at the Democrats Abroad Global Convention in Berlin in May 2016. He tearfully spoke at the convention on 26 July of his intention to cast his vote for his brother. He was the 7th-placed candidate for the Greens in the South East England constituency in the 2019 European Parliament election in the United Kingdom.

== Electoral history ==
=== House of Commons ===
Sanders was selected to contest the Oxford East constituency at the 2017 snap general election. He finished in fourth place with 1,785 votes (3.3%).

General election 2017: Oxford East
Party	Candidate	Votes	%	±%
Labour Co-op	Anneliese Dodds	35,118	65.2	▲15.2
Conservative	Suzanne Bartington	11,834	22.0	▲2.1
Liberal Democrats	Kirsten Johnson	4,904	9.1	▼1.7
Green	Larry Sanders	1,785	3.3	▼8.3
Independent	Chaka Artwell	255	0.5	▲0.2
Majority		23,284	43.2	▲13.1
Turnout		53,896	68.8	▲4.6
Labour Co-op hold		Swing	▲6.5	

Sanders was selected as the Green Party candidate for the Witney by-election after former Prime Minister David Cameron resigned as an MP in September 2016. He finished in fourth place with 1,363 votes (3.54%).

By-election 2016: Witney
Party	Candidate	Votes	%	±%
Conservative	Robert Courts	17,313	45.0	▼15.2
Liberal Democrats	Liz Leffman	11,611	30.2	▲23.4
Labour	Duncan Enright	5,765	15.0	▼2.2
Green	Larry Sanders	1,363	3.5	▼1.6
UKIP	Dickie Bird	1,354	3.5	▼5.7
NHA	Helen Salisbury	433	1.1	0.0
Independent	Daniel Skidmore	151	0.4	New
Monster Raving Loony	Mad Hatter	129	0.3	New
Independent	Nicholas Ward	93	0.2	New
Bus-Pass Elvis	David Bishop	61	0.2	New
Eccentric Party	Lord Toby Jug	59	0.2	New
English Democrat	Winston McKenzie	52	0.1	New
One Love	Emilia Arno	44	0.1	New
Independent	Adam Knight	27	0.1	New
Majority		5,702	14.8	▼28.2
Turnout		38,455	46.8	▼26.5
Conservative hold		Swing	▼19.3	

Sanders stood as the Green Party candidate for Oxford West and Abingdon at the 2015 general election and finished in fifth place, receiving 2,497 votes, 4.4% of the total.

General election 2015: Oxford West and Abingdon
Party	Candidate	Votes	%	±%
Conservative	Nicola Blackwood	26,153	45.7	▲3.4
Liberal Democrats	Layla Moran	16,571	28.9	▼13.1
Labour	Sally Copley	7,274	12.7	▲2.1
UKIP	Alan Harris	3,963	6.9	▲4.2
Green	Larry Sanders	2,497	4.4	▲2.3
NHA	Helen Salisbury	723	1.3	New
Socialist (GB)	Mike Foster	66	0.1	New
Majority		9,582	16.7	▲16.4
Turnout		57,247	75.2	▲5.0
Conservative hold		Swing	▲8.2	

== Sources ==
- Oxfordshire County Council (July 2005). Who and How: Your guide to Oxfordshire County Council.
