= Witney (constituency) =

UK Parliament constituency (since 1983)

Coordinates: 51.73°N 1.54°W

- County constituency for the House of Commons
- Boundaries since 2024
- Boundary of Witney in South East England
- County: Oxfordshire
- Electorate: 70,042 (2023)
- Major settlements: Witney; Carterton; Faringdon

Current constituency
- Created: 1983
- Member of Parliament: Charles Maynard (Liberal Democrats)
- Seats: One
- Created from: Mid Oxfordshire; Banbury

Witney is a county constituency in Oxfordshire represented in the House of Commons of the Parliament of the United Kingdom. It elects one Member of Parliament by the first-past-the-post system of election, and was created for the 1983 general election.

Historically a safe Conservative Party seat for the most part of its existence, it has been represented since 2024 by Charles Maynard of the Liberal Democrats. From 2001 to 2016, the constituency was represented by David Cameron, who was the prime minister from 2010 until his resignation in 2016, and the Leader of the Conservative Party (2005–2016).

== History ==
In the late 19th century, the Bampton East petty sessional division, with Witney at its heart, formed one part of the Woodstock constituency.

Until 1974, much of the seat remained as part of the Woodstock and latterly Banbury constituency. From 1974 to 1983, the area was included in the Mid Oxfordshire seat along with parts of Bullingdon and Ploughley. Since 1983, Witney has been a full parliamentary seat in its own right and comprises the whole of the District of West Oxfordshire with surrounding villages attached until 1997.

Carterton is the second-largest populated town with 14,000 and is situated alongside RAF Brize Norton which is vital to the local economy, being one of the largest and busiest Royal Air Force stations in the country.

The constituency's first MP was Douglas Hurd, who served as a cabinet minister under both Margaret Thatcher and John Major, and retired in 1997. Hurd was succeeded by Shaun Woodward at the 1997 general election. However, Woodward defected to the Labour Party in 1999, and Witney unexpectedly had a Labour MP. Woodward chose not to stand in Witney as a Labour candidate at the next general election and moved to the Labour safe seat of St Helens South instead, following the practice of Alan Howarth in 1997.

At the 2001 general election, David Cameron was elected as MP for Witney. Cameron was re-elected to a fourth term as MP for the constituency at the 2015 general election with a majority of 25,155, the highest in his political career; on that occasion, his Conservative Party won a surprise overall majority in the House of Commons, taking 330 seats to the opposition Labour Party's 232. However, on 24 June 2016, Cameron announced that he would resign as prime minister by that October due to the outcome of the EU Referendum the previous day, in which 51.9% of those who voted supported leaving the EU. Accordingly, Cameron stepped down as premier that July, on the election of Theresa May as Conservative Party leader and prime minister. On 12 September 2016, it was announced that Cameron would resign as MP for Witney. This triggered a by-election, which was won by Robert Courts, also a Conservative, albeit with a significantly reduced majority. His vote share subsequently rose to 55% at both the 2017 and 2019 general elections.

Before the 2019 general election, the Liberal Democrats and Green Party agreed not to run against each other as part of a "Unite to Remain" alliance. This led to Andrew Prosser, who had been selected as the Green Party's prospective candidate, standing down.

At the 2024 general election, Courts was defeated by the Liberal Democrat candidate, Charles Maynard, on a notional swing of over 20%.

== Boundaries and boundary changes ==
Map of 2010–2024 boundaries

=== 1983–1997 ===
- The District of West Oxfordshire wards of Ascott and Shipton, Aston Bampton and Standlake, Bampton, Bladon and Cassington, Brize Norton and Curbridge, Burford, Carterton North, Carterton South, Chadlington, Charlbury, Chipping Norton, Clanfield and Shilton, Combe and Stonesfield, Ducklington, Enstone, Eynsham, Filkins and Langford, Finstock and Leafield, Freeland and Hanborough, Hailey, Kingham, Milton-under-Wychwood, Minster Lovell, North Leigh, Rollright, Stanton Harcourt, Witney East, Witney North, Witney South, Witney West, and Woodstock; and
- The District of Cherwell wards of Gosford, North West Kidlington, South East Kidlington, and Yarnton.

The new constituency was largely formed from the majority of the abolished constituency of Mid-Oxon, including the settlements of Witney, Carterton, Woodstock and Kidlington. Chipping Norton and surrounding rural areas were transferred from the Banbury constituency.

=== 1997–2010 ===
- The District of West Oxfordshire; and
- The District of Cherwell ward of Yarnton.

The remaining two wards of the District of West Oxfordshire (Bartons, and Tackley and Wooton) were transferred from Banbury. Kidlington transferred to Oxford West and Abingdon.

=== 2010–2024 ===
- The District of West Oxfordshire.

Under the Fifth periodic review of Westminster constituencies, the District of Cherwell ward of Yarnton was transferred to Oxford West and Abingdon.

=== 2024–present ===
Further to the 2023 review of Westminster constituencies which came into effect for the 2024 general election, the constituency is composed of the following (as they existed on 1 December 2020):

- The District of Vale of White Horse wards of: Faringdon; Kingston Bagpuize; Thames; Watchfield & Shrivenham.
- The District of West Oxfordshire wards of: Alvescot and Filkins; Ascott and Shipton; Bampton and Clanfield; Brize Norton and Shilton; Burford; Carterton North East; Carterton North West; Carterton South; Ducklington; Hailey, Minster Lovell and Leafield; Milton-under-Wychwood; Standlake, Aston and Stanton Harcourt; Witney Central; Witney East; Witney North; Witney South; Witney West.

Major changes, with Chipping Norton and Charlbury transferred to Banbury, and Woodstock and surrounding areas included in the newly created constituency of Bicester and Woodstock. Partly offset by the transfer in of parts of the District of Vale of White Horse previously in the Wantage constituency, including the town of Faringdon.

== Members of Parliament ==
Election	Member	Party
1983	Douglas Hurd	Conservative
1997	Shaun Woodward	Conservative
1999	Shaun Woodward	Labour
2001	David Cameron	Conservative
2016 by-election	Robert Courts	Conservative
2024	Charles Maynard	Liberal Democrats

== Elections ==
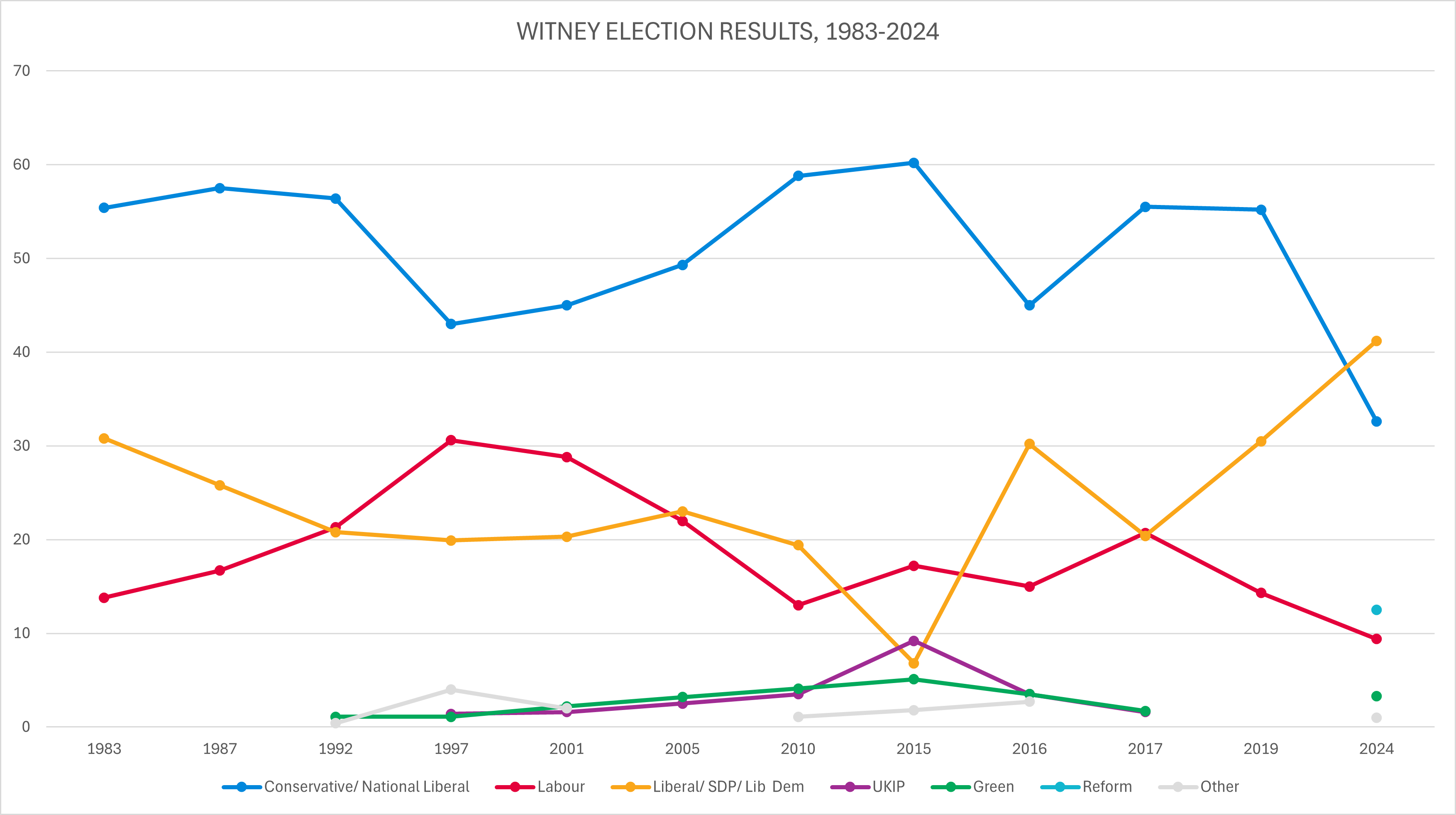
Election results 1983-2024

=== Elections in the 2020s ===
General election 2024: Witney
Party	Candidate	Votes	%	±%
Liberal Democrats	Charles Maynard	20,832	41.2	▲15.2
Conservative	Robert Courts	16,493	32.6	▼25.5
Reform	Richard Langridge	6,307	12.5	▲12.5
Labour	Antonio Weiss	4,773	9.4	▼6.0
Green	Andrew Prosser	1,661	3.3	new
Independent	Barry Ingleton	350	0.7	new
Heritage	David Cox	168	0.3	new
Majority		4,339	8.6	N/A
Turnout		50,584	67.1	▼2.6
Registered electors		75,448		
Liberal Democrats gain from Conservative		Swing	+20.4	

=== Elections in the 2010s ===
2019 notional result
Party	Vote	%
Conservative	28,355	58.1
Liberal Democrats	12,681	26.0
Labour	7,520	15.4
Others	274	0.6
Brexit Party	9	<0.1
Turnout	48,839	69.7
Electorate	70,042	

General election 2019: Witney
Party	Candidate	Votes	%	±%
Conservative	Robert Courts	33,856	55.2	−0.3
Liberal Democrats	Charlotte Hoagland	18,679	30.5	+10.1
Labour Co-op	Rosa Bolger	8,770	14.3	−6.4
Majority		15,177	24.7	−10.1
Turnout		61,305	73.1	−0.5
Conservative hold		Swing	−5.2	

General election 2017: Witney
Party	Candidate	Votes	%	±%
Conservative	Robert Courts	33,839	55.5	−4.7
Labour	Laetisia Carter	12,598	20.7	+3.5
Liberal Democrats	Liz Leffman	12,457	20.4	+13.6
Green	Claire Lasko	1,053	1.7	−3.4
UKIP	Alan Craig	980	1.6	−7.6
Majority		21,241	34.8	−8.2
Turnout		60,927	73.6	+0.3
Conservative hold		Swing	−4.1	

2016 Witney by-election
Party	Candidate	Votes	%	±%
Conservative	Robert Courts	17,313	45.0	−15.2
Liberal Democrats	Liz Leffman	11,611	30.2	+23.4
Labour	Duncan Enright	5,765	15.0	−2.2
Green	Larry Sanders	1,363	3.5	−1.6
UKIP	Dickie Bird	1,354	3.5	−5.7
NHA	Helen Salisbury	433	1.1	0.0
Independent	Daniel Skidmore	151	0.4	New
Monster Raving Loony	Mad Hatter	129	0.3	New
Independent	Nicholas Ward	93	0.2	New
Bus-Pass Elvis	David Bishop	61	0.2	New
Eccentric Party	Lord Toby Jug	59	0.2	New
English Democrat	Winston McKenzie	52	0.1	New
One Love	Emilia Arno	44	0.1	New
Independent	Adam Knight	27	0.1	New
Majority		5,702	14.8	−28.2
Turnout		38,455	46.8	−26.5
Conservative hold		Swing	−19.3	

General election 2015: Witney
Party	Candidate	Votes	%	±%
Conservative	David Cameron	35,201	60.2	+1.4
Labour	Duncan Enright	10,046	17.2	+4.2
UKIP	Simon Strutt	5,352	9.2	+5.7
Liberal Democrats	Andy Graham	3,953	6.8	−12.6
Green	Stuart MacDonald	2,970	5.1	+1.0
NHA	Clive Peedell	616	1.1	New
Wessex Regionalists	Colin Bex	110	0.2	+0.1
Independent	Christopher Tompson	94	0.2	New
Reduce VAT in Sport	Vivien Saunders	56	0.1	New
Give Me Back Elmo	Bobby Smith	37	0.1	New
Land Party	Deek Jackson	35	0.1	New
Independent	Nathan Handley	12	0.02	New
Majority		25,155	43.0	+3.6
Turnout		58,482	73.3	0.0
Conservative hold		Swing	−1.4	

General election 2010: Witney
Party	Candidate	Votes	%	±%
Conservative	David Cameron	33,973	58.8	+9.4
Liberal Democrats	Dawn Barnes	11,233	19.4	−3.1
Labour	Joe Goldberg	7,511	13.0	−9.4
Green	Stuart MacDonald	2,385	4.1	+1.0
UKIP	Nikolai Tolstoy	2,001	3.5	+0.9
Monster Raving Loony	Howling Laud Hope	234	0.3	New
Independent	Paul Wesson	166	0.3	New
Independent	Johnnie Cook	151	0.3	New
Wessex Regionalists	Colin Bex	62	0.1	New
Independent	Aaron Barschak	53	0.1	New
Majority		22,740	39.4	+12.5
Turnout		57,769	73.3	+4.3
Conservative hold		Swing	+6.3	

=== Elections in the 2000s ===
General election 2005: Witney
Party	Candidate	Votes	%	±%
Conservative	David Cameron	26,571	49.3	+4.3
Liberal Democrats	Liz Leffman	12,415	23.0	+2.7
Labour	Tony Gray	11,845	22.0	−6.8
Green	Richard Dossett-Davies	1,682	3.2	+1.0
UKIP	Paul Wesson	1,356	2.5	+0.9
Majority		14,156	26.3	+10.1
Turnout		53,869	69.0	+3.1
Conservative hold		Swing	+0.8	

General election 2001: Witney
Party	Candidate	Votes	%	±%
Conservative	David Cameron	22,153	45.0	+2.0
Labour	Michael Bartlet	14,180	28.8	−1.8
Liberal Democrats	Gareth Epps	10,000	20.3	+0.4
Green	Mark Stevenson	1,100	2.2	+1.1
Independent	Barry Beadle	1,003	2.0	New
UKIP	Kenneth Dukes	767	1.6	+0.2
Majority		7,973	16.2	+3.8
Turnout		49,203	65.9	−10.8
Conservative hold		Swing	+1.9	

=== Elections in the 1990s ===
General election 1997: Witney
Party	Candidate	Votes	%	±%
Conservative	Shaun Woodward	24,282	43.0	−14.8
Labour	Alexander Hollingsworth	17,254	30.6	+12.5
Liberal Democrats	Angela Lawrence	11,202	19.9	−2.7
Referendum	Geoffrey Brown	2,262	4.0	New
UKIP	Michael Montgomery	765	1.4	New
Green	Sue Chapple-Perrie	636	1.1	0.0
Majority		7,028	12.4	−27.3
Turnout		56,401	76.7	−4.2
Conservative hold		Swing	−13.7	

General election 1992: Witney
Party	Candidate	Votes	%	±%
Conservative	Douglas Hurd	36,256	56.4	−1.1
Labour	James Plaskitt	13,688	21.3	+4.6
Liberal Democrats	Ian Blair	13,393	20.8	−5.0
Green	Charlotte Beckford	716	1.1	New
Natural Law	Sally Catling	134	0.2	New
Ind. Conservative	Marilyn Brown	119	0.2	New
Majority		22,568	35.1	+3.4
Turnout		64,306	81.9	+4.6
Conservative hold		Swing	−2.8	

=== Elections in the 1980s ===
General election 1987: Witney
Party	Candidate	Votes	%	±%
Conservative	Douglas Hurd	33,458	57.5	+2.1
Liberal	Muriel Burton	14,994	25.8	−5.0
Labour	Christine Collette	9,733	16.7	+2.9
Majority		18,464	31.7	+7.1
Turnout		58,185	77.3	+2.6
Conservative hold		Swing	+3.6	

General election 1983: Witney
Party	Candidate	Votes	%	±%
Conservative	Douglas Hurd	28,695	55.4	
Liberal	Philip Baston	15,983	30.8	
Labour	Carole Douse	7,145	13.8	
Majority		12,712	24.6	
Turnout		51,823	74.7	
Conservative win (new seat)				

== See also ==
- Parliamentary constituencies in Oxfordshire
- Parliamentary constituencies in South East England
- Henley (UK Parliament constituency)
- Oxford East
- Oxford West and Abingdon
- Wantage (UK Parliament constituency)

Parliament of the United Kingdom
Preceded by Folkestone and Hythe	Constituency represented by the leader of the opposition 2005–2010	Succeeded by Camberwell and Peckham
Preceded by Kirkcaldy and Cowdenbeath	Constituency represented by the prime minister 2010–2016	Succeeded by Maidenhead
