= Charlie Maynard =

British politician

Charlie Maynard MP
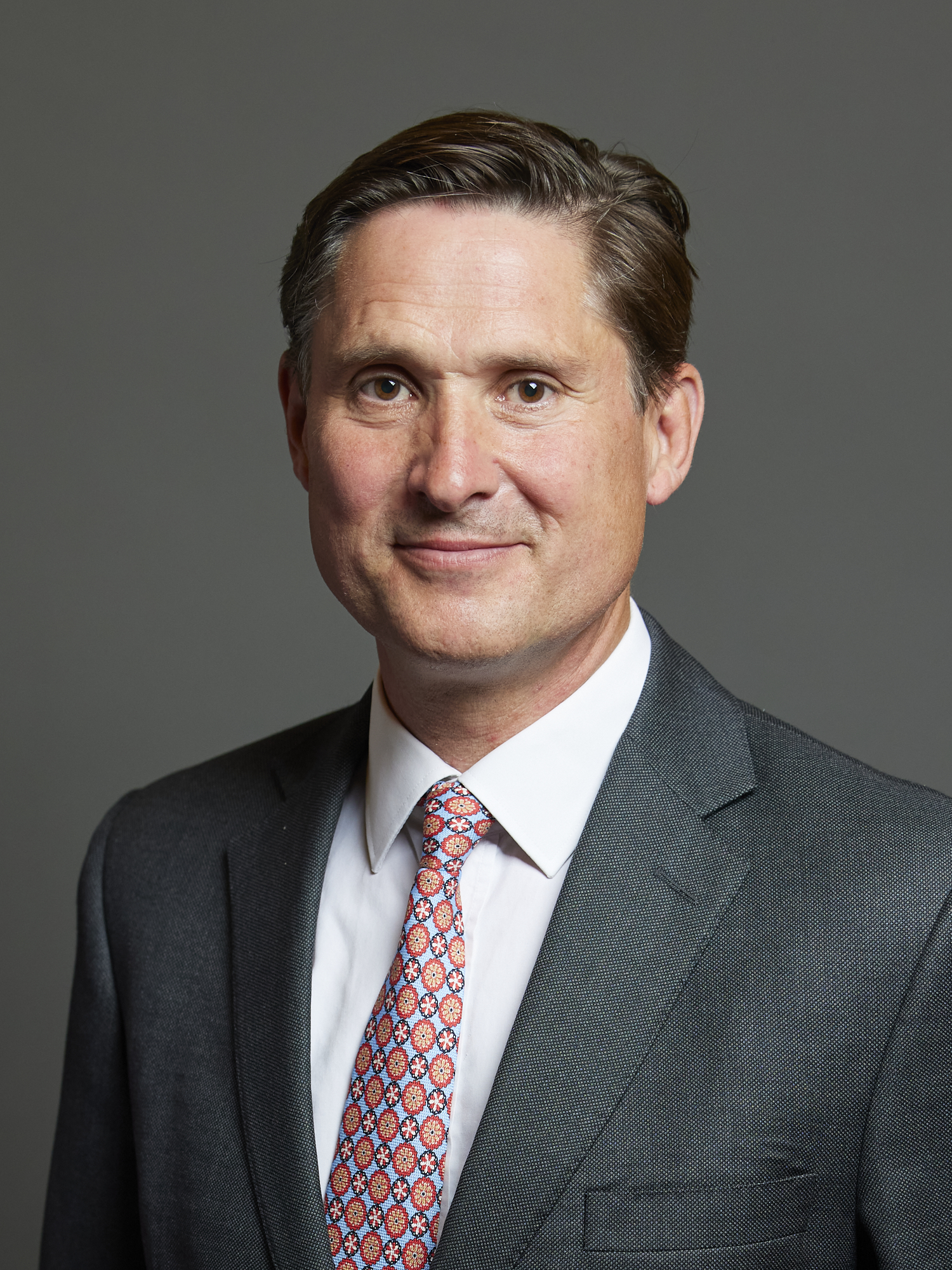
- Official portrait, 2024

Liberal Democrat Shadow Chief Secretary to the Treasury
- In office 1 October 2025 – 9 October 2026
- Leader: Ed Davey

Member of Parliament for Witney
- Incumbent
- Assumed office 4 July 2024
- Preceded by: Robert Courts
- Majority: 4,339 (8.6%)

Member of West Oxfordshire District Council for Standlake, Aston and Stanton Harcourt
- Incumbent
- Assumed office 9 May 2022

Personal details
- Born: Charles Adrian MacFie Maynard; February 1971 (age 55)
- Party: Liberal Democrats
- Education: Christ Church, Oxford
- Website: www.charliemaynard.org

Charles Adrian MacFie Maynard (born February 1971) is a British politician who has been Member of Parliament (MP) for Witney since 2024. A member of the Liberal Democrats, he gained the seat from Robert Courts, a member of the Conservative Party. Maynard was previously a member of West Oxfordshire District Council and founder of mergers and acquisitions firm BDA Partners in 1996. He previously served as the Liberal Democrat Shadow Chief Secretary to the Treasury between 2025 and 2026.

== Early life and education ==
Maynard was born in Southampton. He studied geography at Christ Church, Oxford from 1990 to 1993.

== Career ==
Maynard co-founded BDA Partners, an international investment advice company, in 1996 when he was 25. BDA Partners is a global advisor on mergers and acquisitions with nine offices across Asia, Europe and the US. He resigned as managing partner in December 2020 and made a move into politics, saying he wanted “to do more to help people, protect our environment and do his part to get our country headed in a better direction”. This led him to work first to volunteer and then serve as a trustee at Citizens Advice West Oxfordshire. He also chaired the Witney Oxford Transport Group, and worked full time, pro-bono for 18 months to develop a project to rebuild the railway link between Carterton, Witney, Eynsham and Oxford. He has continued to advocate for this since his election to Parliament.

Maynard was elected as a district councillor for Standlake, Aston and Stanton Harcourt at the 2022 West Oxfordshire District Council election. He was selected as the Liberal Democrat candidate for Witney in December 2022. He served as the District Council's Executive Member for Planning and Sustainable Development from November 2023 until standing down in May 2024 in order to stand for Parliament. Following his election as MP, Maynard resigned his council seat in 2025.

== Parliamentary career ==
Maynard was elected as Member of Parliament for Witney in the 2024 general election. He received 41.2 per cent of the vote and a majority of 4,339 over the incumbent Conservative MP Robert Courts, then Solicitor General for England and Wales, who had represented the seat since 2016. Maynard became the first non-Conservative MP elected for Witney since 1922.

On 18 February 2025, Maynard participated on behalf of Thames Water customers at a high court hearing, arguing against the approval for an emergency debt package worth up to £3bn. When the judge ruled in favour of Thames Water, Maynard also led an appeal against the decision, and appeared at the Court of Appeal hearing on 11 March 2025, acting on behalf of over 25 MPs, 34 charities and several individual Thames Water customers to argue the judge had been wrong to sanction the bail-out. On 17 June 2025, Maynard announced that he and a group of Thames Water's secondary creditors would be taking their case against the company's restructuring to the Supreme Court. In November 2025, The Guardian revealed that Thames Water had unsuccessfully sought a Supreme Court ruling that Maynard should be required to pay the company's legal fees of up to £1,400 an hour.

From October 2025 until 9 October 2026, Maynard held the role of Liberal Democrat Shadow Chief Secretary to the Treasury. As Liberal Democrat Shadow Chief Secretary to the Treasury, he often contributed to Parliamentary debates on economic issues. He frequently argued that the level of national debt is too high and has called for reform of the Government’s ‘fiscal rules’ on the basis that they are “easily gamed” and “our national debt is now six times larger than 20 years ago”.

Maynard is a Member of the Business, Innovation, Science and Trade Select Committee since September 2024 where he has raised issues including: Russian Trade Sanctions; challenged Ticketmaster and Live Nation on their market share; small businesses; Competition and Market Authority; UK trade with the US, India and EU.

Maynard has quizzed ministers on Israel arms exports in December 2024, September 2025, and most recently in July 2026 when he got Minister Chris Bryant to commit to publishing data on actual arms deliveries under export licences from the first quarter of 2027.

Maynard was a strong opponent of Brexit and frequently speaks about economic impact of the Brexit deal. He is a strong advocate of rebuilding closer trading relationships with Europe and has said he would like to see Britain rejoin the EU.

Maynard has expressed concerns about the security risks from Artificial Intelligence, saying "AI is a huge opportunity, but it also comes with significant risks". He has raised multiple questions about this in Parliament.

Maynard is the Vice-Chair of the Less Survivable Cancers APPG and a member of the Brain Cancer APPG. . He has participated in numerous Backbench Business and Westminster Hall debates on the subject calling for tissue freezing and storage for research and the need for whole genome sequencing. His sister Georgie Maynard was diagnosed with Glioblastoma in May 2023 and is the founder of the activist group Brain Cancer Justice.

Maynard often speaks about issues impacting farmers. He opposed the end of Agricultural Property Relief for family farms and has criticised the administration of grants to support farmers.

Maynard voted in favour of the recent Terminally Ill Adults (End of Life) Bill. He said he supports the principle for adults who have the mental capacity "to avoid suffering in their final months…[but] would not have supported the bill if he "was not confident in the protections it contains".

On 9 October 2026, Maynard resigned as a Treasury Spokesperson and asked for other Liberal Democrat MPs to support a vote of no confidence in Ed Davey as Leader of the Liberal Democrats.

== Personal life ==
Maynard's family has hosted Syrian and Ukrainian refugees in their home. Maynard has run two marathons, including the New York Marathon which he finished in 3 hours 15 minutes, raising money for Whizz Kidz.

In 2023 his sister Georgie was diagnosed with brain cancer. She is founder of Brain Cancer Justice.

Parliament of the United Kingdom
Preceded by Robert Courts	Member of Parliament for Witney; 2024–present	Incumbent
