= Robert Courts =

British politician and barrister (born 1978)

Robert Courts KC
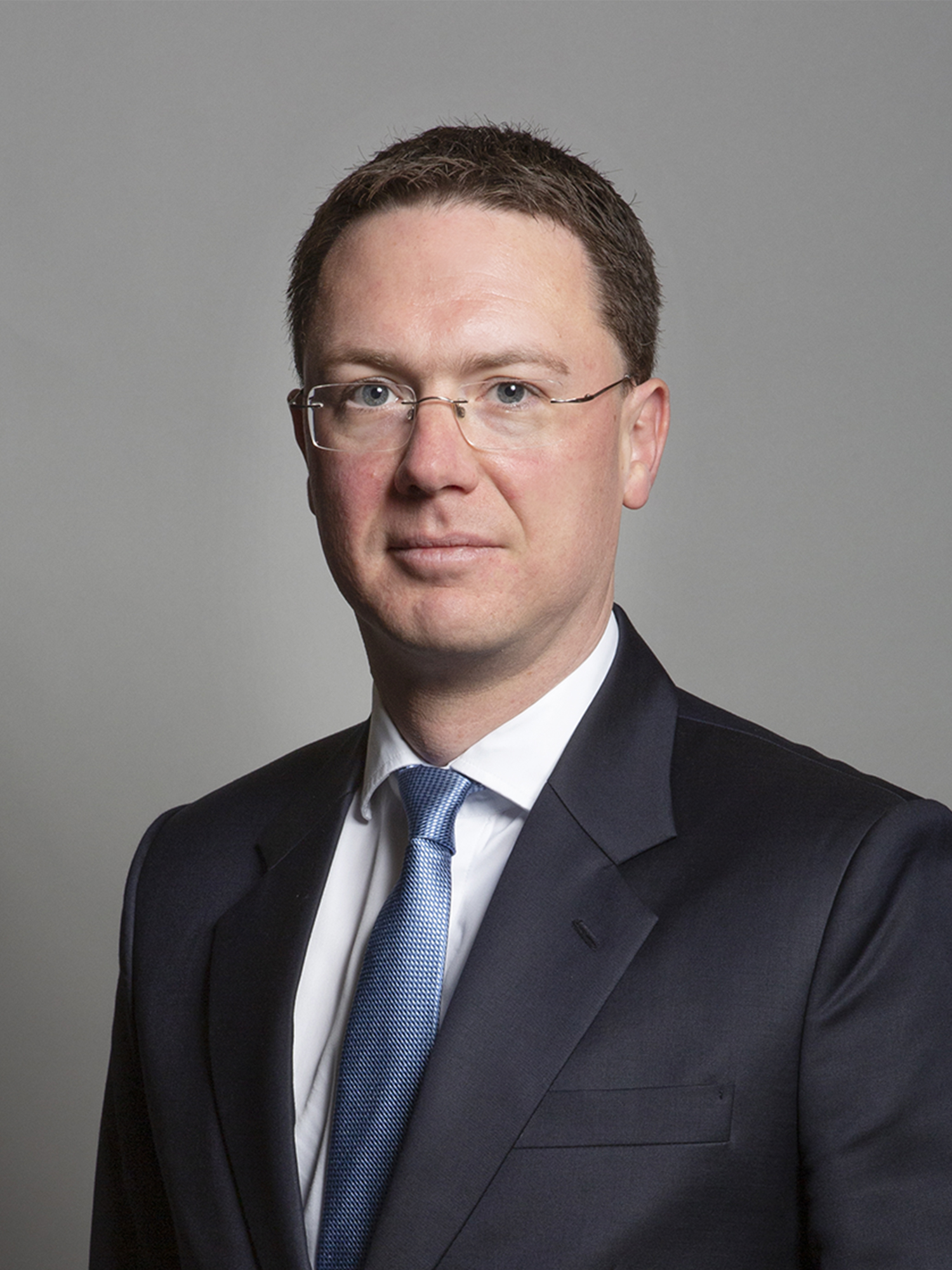
- Official portrait, 2019

Solicitor General for England and Wales
- In office 7 December 2023 – 5 July 2024
- Prime Minister: Rishi Sunak
- Preceded by: Michael Tomlinson
- Succeeded by: Sarah Sackman

Chair of the Defence Select Committee
- In office 25 October 2023 – 12 December 2023
- Preceded by: Tobias Ellwood
- Succeeded by: Jeremy Quin

Parliamentary Under-Secretary of State for Transport
- In office 8 September 2020 – 20 September 2022
- Prime Minister: Boris Johnson
- Preceded by: Kelly Tolhurst
- Succeeded by: Anne-Marie Trevelyan (Note: The junior role for shipping and aviation was assumed directly by the Secretary of State for Transport.)

Member of Parliament for Witney
- In office 20 October 2016 – 30 May 2024
- Preceded by: David Cameron
- Succeeded by: Charlie Maynard

Personal details
- Born: 21 October 1978 (age 48) Stockport, Greater Manchester, England
- Party: Conservative
- Spouse: Kathryn
- Children: 2
- Education: University of Sheffield
- Website: robertcourts.co.uk

Robert Alexander Courts KC (born 21 October 1978) is a British Conservative politician and barrister who was the Member of Parliament (MP) for Witney from 2016 to 2024. He served as Solicitor General for England and Wales from December 2023 to 2024. He previously served as Parliamentary Under-Secretary of State for Transport in the Johnson government from 2020 to 2022 and served as Chair of the Defence Select Committee from October to December 2023.

Courts was elected for Witney at a by-election in 2016, succeeding former Prime Minister David Cameron, but was defeated in the 2024 general election.

== Early life and career ==
Robert Courts was born on 21 October 1978 in Stockport. His father Ian Courts is a solicitor, company director, and the Conservative leader of Solihull Metropolitan Borough Council. His mother, Sheila, is a school governor.

Courts was privately educated at Berkhamsted School, where he was head of Fry's House, before studying law at the University of Sheffield.

He was called to the Bar at Lincoln's Inn in 2003 and practises as a barrister at 3PB Chambers principally in the fields of personal injury/clinical negligence and public and regulatory law. He worked in Wellington, New Zealand, at the Crown Law Office (Legal Advisors) for the New Zealand Government in 2009.

Courts stood as a Council candidate in Solihull in 2002 but was unsuccessful. Courts was elected a Conservative member of West Oxfordshire District Council in 2014.

Courts supported the 'Leave' campaign in the 2016 Brexit referendum.

== Parliamentary career ==
He was selected as the Conservative Party candidate in the 2016 Witney by-election. At the election, Courts was elected as MP for Witney with 45% of the vote and a majority of 5,702.

He is a member of the European Research Group, having subscribed in April 2017.

At the snap 2017 general election, Courts was re-elected as MP for Witney with an increased vote share of 55.5% and an increased majority of 21,241.

He was appointed parliamentary private secretary (PPS) for the Foreign and Commonwealth Office in January 2018, but resigned as a PPS on 15 July 2018, in protest of the White Paper on Exiting the European Union and the Chequers plan.

Courts' main Parliamentary interests are defence and foreign policy. He is credited by the House of Commons library with helping to lead the "parliamentary pressure" that led to the announcement of the Ministry of Defence's Combat Air Strategy, the programme for the eventual replacement of the Eurofighter Typhoon. Courts represents RAF Brize Norton, the largest RAF base in the UK, and serves as the vice chair of the All-Party Parliamentary Group for the Armed Forces. He is a council member of the Air League.

In October 2018, the Parliamentary Commissioner for Standards found Courts had breached rules by using official stationery in campaign updates.

In August 2019, Courts was appointed parliamentary private secretary to the Secretary of State for Environment, Food and Rural Affairs, Theresa Villiers. Regarding parliamentary procedure, Courts has been an outspoken critic of Early day motions (EDMs), describing them as "parliamentary graffiti". Courts has said that EDMs are generally tabled by MPs on behalf of "lobbyists or groups keen to show themselves as doing something", that they are "politically impotent" and a waste of taxpayers' money.

At the 2019 general election, Courts was again re-elected, with a decreased vote share of 55.2% and a decreased majority of 15,177.

Courts was a supporter of the proposed free trade deal with Australia and New Zealand, describing it as a "no-brainer".

In 2024, Courts criticized the construction of a larger solar farm in Botley West.

After nearly eight years in office, Courts lost his seat at the 2024 general election to the Liberal Democrat candidate Charlie Maynard, becoming the first Conservative candidate to lose in the Witney constituency since its inception in 1983. His share of the vote decreased to 32.6%.

=== Under-Secretary of State for Transport ===
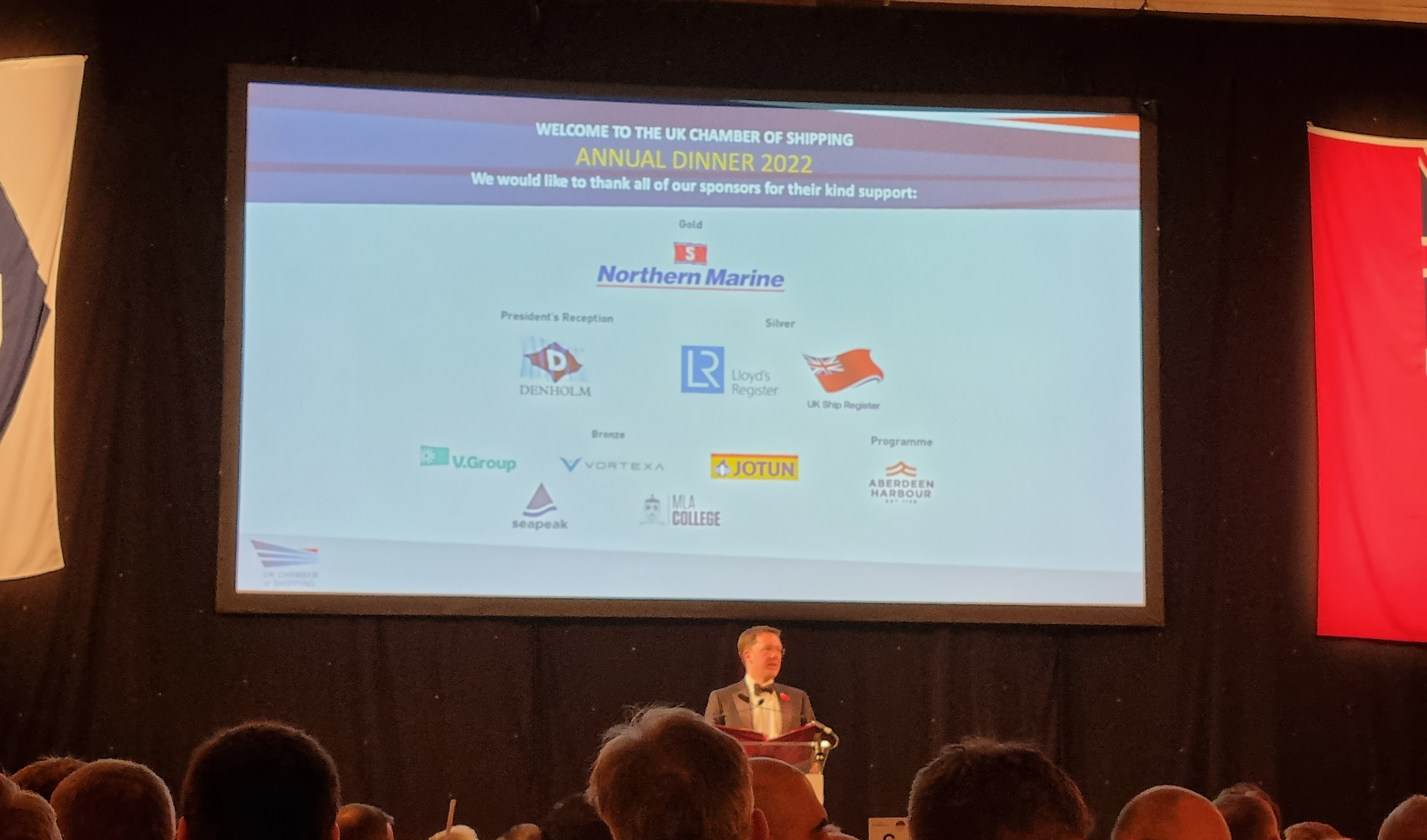
Courts speaking at the UK Chamber of Shipping Annual Dinner in 2022 at the Grosvenor House Hotel in London

Courts was appointed Parliamentary Under-Secretary of State for Transport on 8 September 2020. His responsibilities include aviation and maritime affairs. In February 2022, he gave the keynote speech at the UK Chamber of Shipping annual dinner, urging for investment in sustainable shipping and a review to gather information related to shore power in ports. Courts is a supporter of High Speed 2 (HS2).

In June 2022, Courts was held partly accountable for the aviation travel crisis in UK airports. However, he was subsequently involved in significant discussions with Grant Shapps and senior aviation leaders to discuss the crisis.

Courts left the front bench when Liz Truss became prime minister. The new transport secretary, Anne-Marie Trevelyan, took direct responsibility for the shipping brief.

=== Solicitor General ===
After returning to the backbenches, Courts was elected chair of the Defence Select Committee on 25 October 2022. However he returned to government on 7 December 2023 as Solicitor General for England and Wales, receiving the courtesy appointment as King's Counsel, on 24 January 2024, as is customary for barrister MPs appointed to government legal offices.

== Post-parliamentary career ==
Following his defeat at the 2024 general election, Courts co-founded the public affairs consultancy Ascalane Partners, and also currently serves as its Director.

== Personal life ==
Courts is married to Kathryn; they have two young children, and live in the village of Bladon, Oxfordshire.

He has been a member of the International Churchill Society for many years, and reviews books about Winston Churchill in the quarterly journal, Finest Hour.

== Notes ==
Parliament of the United Kingdom
Preceded by David Cameron	Member of Parliament for Witney; 2016–2024	Succeeded by Charlie Maynard
Political offices
Preceded by Kelly Tolhurst	Parliamentary Under-Secretary of State for Transport; 2020–2022	Succeeded by Anne-Marie Trevelyan
Legal offices
Preceded by Michael Tomlinson	Solicitor General for England and Wales; 2023–2024	Succeeded by Sarah Sackman
