= Clive Peedell =

English doctor and politician

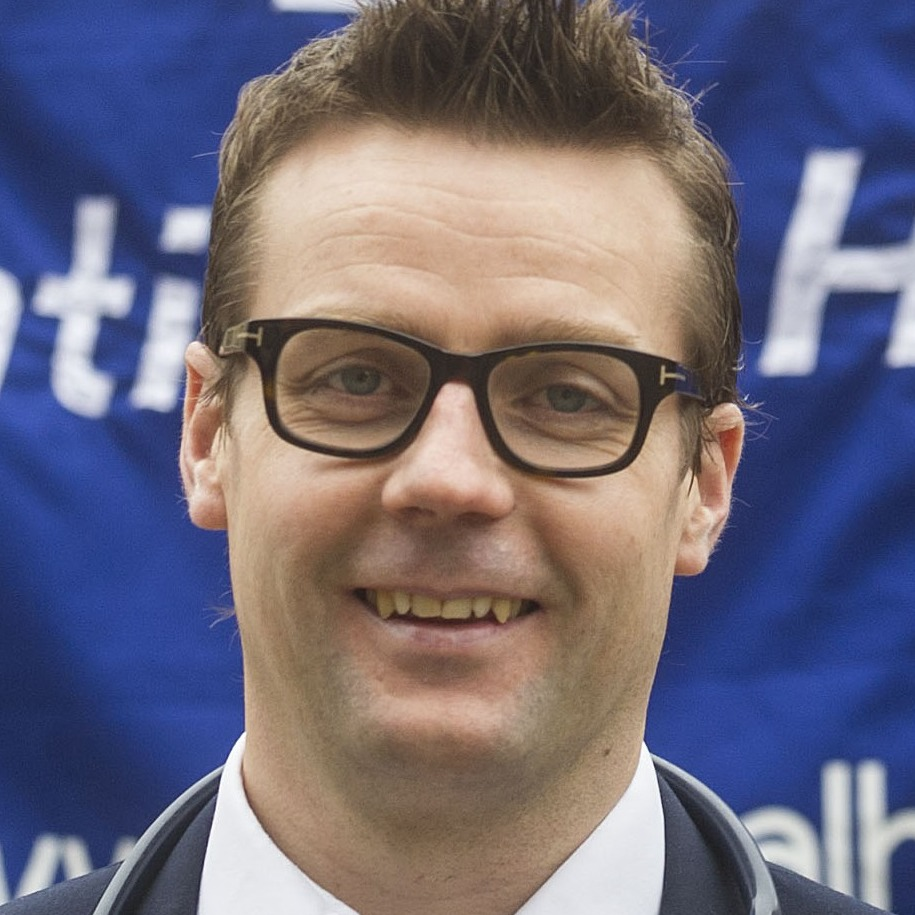
- Peedell in 2015

Leader of the National Health Action Party
- In office 2012–2016
- Preceded by: Party established
- Succeeded by: Paul Hobday (Interim)

Personal details
- Party: National Health Action Party (NHA)
- Children: 2
- Education: Magdalen College School, Oxford; University of Southampton
- Profession: Doctor

Clive Peedell is an English politician and doctor specialising in oncology. He is a co-founder and former leader of the National Health Action Party. He stood as the candidate for Witney against Prime Minister David Cameron in the 2015 general election.

== Medical career ==
Peedell has worked in hospitals in Swindon, Southampton, Northampton, Leeds and Middlesbrough where, since 2004, he has been a consultant clinical oncologist. He is a member of the BMA Council and co-chair of the NHS Consultants Association. Winner of the 2013 HSJ Efficiency Awards (Innovation in Medical Technology) for leading the implementation of the South Tees Stereotactic Ablative Radiotherapy (SABR) program. He is author of Concise Clinical Oncology (Elsevier, 2005) and led the influential letter to The Times signed by over one hundred of the UK's leading cancer doctors and researchers opposing the Medical Innovation Bill.

== Political career ==
In 2012, Peedell and Dr Richard Taylor co-founded the National Health Action Party in response to the Coalition Government's Health and Social Care Act 2012, which they saw as preparing the ground for the destruction of the National Health Service as a publicly funded, publicly provided, publicly accountable universal healthcare system free at the point of need. The Party ran a number of candidates for the 2014 European Parliament election, after which he announced his intention to stand for election in David Cameron's Witney constituency in the 2015 general election. He came sixth with 1% of the vote in that election. Peedell was lobbying to prevent the privatisation of the NHS and any further budget cuts. His main ambition is to rid the NHS of "the internal market and return it to a publicly funded, publicly provided, and publicly accountable health service-owned by the people, for the people".

That year he also ran 160 miles in six days, from Aneurin Bevan's statue in Cardiff to the Department of Health in London, in protest against the Health and Social Care Act 2012. This followed his 2013, 65-mile 'CAMarathon' on the 65th birthday of the NHS, from the Department of Health to Witney, where he buried "the NHS coffin" on Church Green.

He resigned as leader of the National Health Action Party in July 2016.

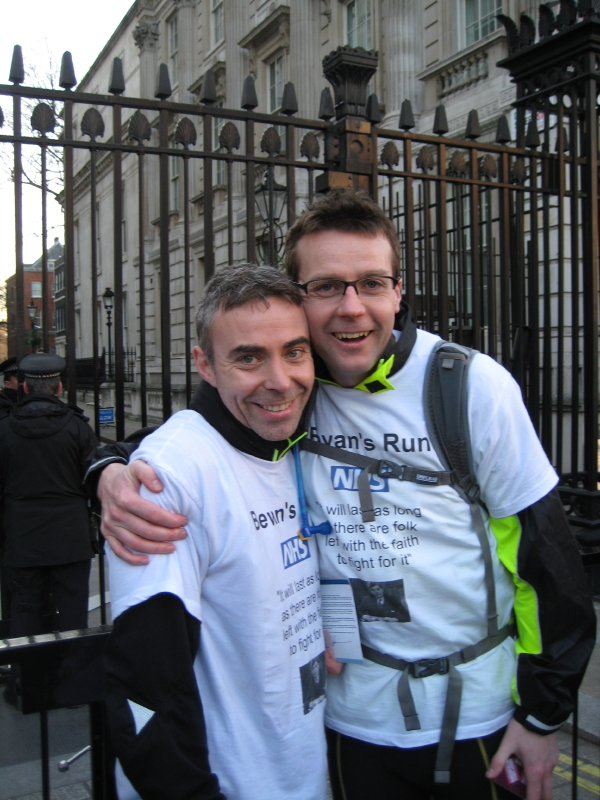
Bevan's Run January 2012

== Personal life ==
Peedell was educated at Magdalen College School, Oxford and the University of Southampton (BM, MRCP, FRCR). He is married with two children. A lifelong supporter of Oxford United F.C., he had trials for both Oxford and Leyton Orient F.C.
