= National Health Action Party =

Political party in the UK

- Abbreviation: NHA
- Co-leaders: Alastair Fischer and Veronika Wagner
- Founded: 14 May 2012
- Dissolved: 5 November 2025
- Headquarters: Kidderminster
- Ideology: Re-nationalisation of the NHS; Environmentalism; Anti-austerity; Reformism
- Colours: Blue
- Local government (England & Wales): 0 / 19,370

Website
- http://www.nhaparty.org

The National Health Action Party (NHA) was a political party in the United Kingdom.

The party grew out of the movement opposing the 2012 Health and Social Care Act. It campaigned for renationalisation of the privatised parts of the English National Health Service, reductions in outsourcing, and improvements to NHS funding, service provision and staffing. Despite focusing on health, the party had a range of policies in areas such as the economy, housing and education. These include opposition to austerity and a call for political reform.

== History ==
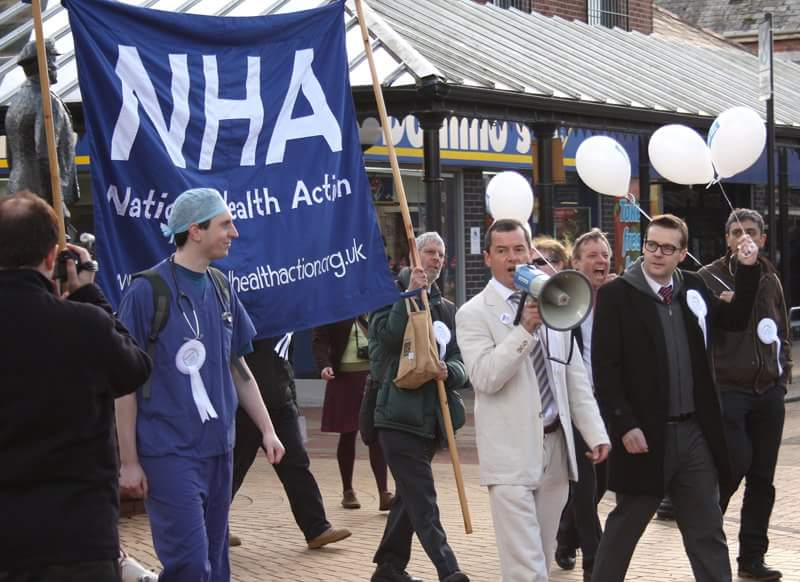
Alex Ashman (left), Iain Maclennan (center) and Clive Peedell (right) campaigning during the 2013 Eastleigh by-election.

The passage of the Health and Social Care Act in March 2012 prompted the party's co-founder Clive Peedell, a cancer specialist doctor, to co-write an open letter to The Independent alongside esteemed medical signatories. The letter was highly critical of the Liberal Democrats for their role in the passage of the Act and stated that the signatories would "form a coalition of healthcare professionals to take on coalition MPs at the next General Election, on the non-party, independent ticket of defending the NHS and acting in the wider public interest". Two months later, on 14 May 2012, Peedell co-founded the NHA Party with retired doctor Richard Taylor, who had twice been elected as MP for Wyre Forest on an 'independent health' component to his local hospital party name. The party was launched in Westminster in November 2012.

The party first stood in the 2013 Eastleigh by-election, with candidate Dr Iain Maclennan taking 392 votes. The party went on to stand in the 2014 European Parliament elections and the 2015 General Election, taking over 20,000 votes in each. This placed the party seventh in the popular vote in England in the latter. The party's best result to date was the 7,211 votes taken by Dr Richard Taylor in Wyre Forest in 2015 (he had been the MP from 2001 to 2010 under the label Independent Kidderminster Hospital and Health Concern).

Party co-founder Dr Clive Peedell resigned the leadership in July 2016, and Dr Paul Hobday was appointed as interim leader. Surgical registrar Dr Alex Ashman was elected as the new permanent party leader in December 2016 and promised to continue the work begun by Drs Peedell and Taylor. Dr Ashman resigned as leader in 2019 and was replaced by co-leaders Alastair Fischer and Veronika Wagner.

Supporters have included authors Mark Haddon and Philip Pullman, satirist Armando Iannucci, science writer Marcus Chown and comedian Rufus Hound. Hound stood as an NHA Party candidate in the London constituency for the 2014 European elections.

The party was deregistered in November 2025.

== Policies ==
The party had a range of policies on healthcare, political reform, the economy, immigration, housing, education and environmental sustainability.

=== Health ===
- To reverse privatisation and restore a publicly run NHS that provides universal healthcare.
- To repeal the Health and Social Care Act 2012, remove the internal market and purchaser/provider split, and end use of Private Finance Initiative (PFI) deals.
- To protect the NHS from involvement in international trade agreements such as TTIP.
- To involve patients and staff in NHS decision processes and reduce reliance on management consultants.
- To improve public health, social care, housing and other matters that affect the nation's health.
- To combat gender inequality in healthcare and the workplace
- To demand a moratorium on hospital re-configurations unless there are evidence-based, clinical reasons with local and staff support and adequate alternatives already in place.

=== Political reform ===
- To enact stricter controls on MPs' and Peers' voting when they have a conflict of interest.
- To reform the House of Lords so at least 80% of members are directly elected through single transferable vote, while the remainder are appointed for fixed terms based on expertise in specialist fields
- To review the system of party whips and the practice of voting without attending debate.
- To end the revolving door culture of UK politics.
- To lower the voting age to 16.
- To appoint a commission to investigate a move towards proportional representation.

=== Economy ===
- To reject austerity and oppose further public spending cuts.
- To increase spending on key public services and infrastructure with a view to increasing the UK's GDP.
- To ensure taxation is progressive and take actions to reduce tax avoidance and evasion.
- To improve regulation of the financial sector, including separation of the retail and investment arms of banks.
- To introduce a living wage, ban zero-hour contracts and work towards a state of minimal unemployment.

== Electoral performance ==
=== General election results ===
Year	Candidates	Total votes	Average votes per candidate	% of total vote	Average % vote per candidate	Saved Deposits	Number of MPs
2015	12	20,210	1,684	0.1	3.26	2	0
2017	5	16,119	3,224	0.1	5.64	2	0

==== 2015 general election ====
NHA campaign launch 2015. From left to right: Richard Taylor, Paul Hobday, John Lamport, Clive Peedell, Helen Salisbury, Karen Howell, Roseanne Edwards, Louise Irvine, Dave Ash.

The party stood 12 candidates in the 2015 general election. Targeted seats included those of leading proponents of the Health and Social Care Bill such as David Cameron and Jeremy Hunt. The candidates were:

Candidate	Constituency	Votes	%
Dave Ash	Sutton and Cheam	345	0.7%
Roseanne Edwards	Banbury	729	1.3%
Rik Evans	Truro and Falmouth	526	1.0%
Rebecca Fox	Camberwell and Peckham	466	0.9%
Dr. Bob Gill	Old Bexley and Sidcup	1,216	2.6%
Dr. Paul Hobday	Maidstone and The Weald	583	1.2%
Karen Howell	Stafford	1,701	3.5%
Dr. Louise Irvine	South West Surrey	4,851	8.5%
Dr. Clive Peedell	Witney	616	1.1%
Dr. Helen Salisbury	Oxford West and Abingdon	723	1.3%
Dr. Richard Taylor	Wyre Forest	7,211	14.6%
Dr. Carl Walker	East Worthing and Shoreham	1,243	2.5%

Among the twelve candidates, the party won no seats and only saved two deposits (i.e. won more than 5%). Their best result came in Wyre Forest, where Dr Taylor (who had previously won the seat twice for the Independent Kidderminster Hospital and Health Concern party) came 4th with 14.6% of the vote. Dr Irvine came 4th with 8.5% in South West Surrey.

==== 2017 general election ====
The party stood five candidates at the 2017 general election. Food blogger and activist Jack Monroe was announced as the NHA Party candidate for Southend West, but withdrew due to ill health and receiving death threats. The candidates standing were:

Candidate	Constituency	Votes	%	Change from 2015
Dr Louise Irvine	South West Surrey	12,093	20.0%	▲11.5%
Dr Carl Walker	East Worthing and Shoreham	575	1.1%	▼1.4%
Mark Jarnell	South Ribble	341	0.6%	n/a
Dr John Dean	Central Devon	871	1.5%	n/a
Neal Stote	Redditch	2,239	5%	n/a

=== 2024 general election ===
The party stood one candidate, Stephen McNally in Liverpool Riverside, gaining 247 votes or 0.8% of the vote.

=== Local election results ===
Year	Candidates	Total votes	Average votes per candidate	Average % vote per candidate	Number of Councillors
2014	7	1,177	168	6	0
2015	4	638	160	3.1	0
2016	0	0	N/A	N/A	0
2017	1	228	228	22	0
2018	0	0	N/A	N/A	0
2019	1	344	344	6	0
2022	1	219			

=== European Parliament election results ===
Year	London constituency	MEPs elected
2014	23,253	0

=== By-election results ===
Constituency	Date	Candidate	Number of votes	% of votes	Position
Eastleigh	28 February 2013	Iain Maclennan	392	0.9	6th
Witney	20 October 2016	Helen Salisbury	433	1.1	6th

== See also ==
- Keep Our NHS Public
