= Candidates in the 2015 United Kingdom general election =

3,971 candidates stood in the United Kingdom general election of 2015, which was held on 7 May 2015.

The deadline for parties and individuals to file candidate nomination papers to the acting returning officer (and the deadline for candidates to withdraw) was 4 p.m. on 9 April 2015.

The total number of candidates was 3,971; this is the second-highest number in history, slightly down from the record 4,150 candidates at the last election in 2010.

== Overall candidate profile ==
=== Gender ===
A record number of female candidates stood in terms of both absolute numbers and percentage of candidates: 1,020 (26.1%), up from 854 (21.1%) in 2010. The proportion of female candidates varied by region: 26.6% in Wales, 26.2% in England (30.4% in London), 25.6% in Scotland, and 23.9% in Northern Ireland. The proportion of female candidates was lowest in eastern England (21.6%).

Parties with the highest proportion of female candidates were the Alliance Party of Northern Ireland (41%), the Greens (in England and Wales and Scotland) (38%), and the SNP (36%). The party with the lowest proportion was UKIP (12%). The constituency with the most female candidates was Camberwell and Peckham in south London, where five women and four men were standing. In 120 constituencies, no female candidate stood.

=== Occupation ===
University College London's Parliamentary Candidates UK project evaluated the background of 2015 general-election candidates (excluding incumbent MPs) from the seven major parties: Conservative, Labour, Liberal Democrat, UKIP, Plaid Cymru, the SNP, and the Greens.

The project found that 26% of candidates contesting the 2015 general election were political professionals (defined as those currently working as advisers, researchers, party officials, trade unionists or lobbyists). The parties with the highest percentage of political-professional candidates were the SNP (47%), Labour (33%), and Plaid Cymru (33%); the party with the lowest percentage of political-professional candidates is UKIP. The parties with the highest proportion of lobbyist candidates are the Conservatives (27%) and the Liberal Democrats (21%).

The party with the highest percentages of candidates from a business or commercial background was UKIP (37%) and the Conservatives (21%); the lowest is the Greens (15%). The party with the highest percentages of candidates in professions such as law and teaching are the Liberal Democrats (16%) followed by Labour (12%).

The Conservatives have the largest number of researcher candidates (12), but the SNP has the largest percentage of researcher candidates (five researchers, or 8% of its candidates). Some 23% of Labour candidates work in trade unions. The Liberal Democrats have the highest percentage of candidates who sit on local councils (53%), followed by the SNP (43%) and UKIP (40%).

=== Age ===
According to UCL's Parliamentary Candidates UK project, the average age of the candidates for the seven major parties is 45; there is substantial deviation among the parties, with Conservatives having the youngest average (41) and UKIP the oldest (52); in the middle are Labour (43) and the Liberal Democrats (47). Among marginal seats—those constituencies that are highly contested—UKIP and the Liberal Democrats both have a lower average age for candidates (44) than for all seats in general, while the Conservatives, Labour, and Greens all have slightly older candidates in such seats than for seats in general.

The youngest candidates are Solomon Curtis, 18, of Labour, standing in the safe Conservative seat of Wealden; Niamh McCarthy, 18, an independent, standing in the safe Labour seat of Liverpool Wavertree; Michael Burrows, 18, of UKIP, standing in Inverclyde, Scotland; Declan Lloyd, of Labour, standing in South East Cornwall; and Laura-Jane Rossington, 18, of the Communist Party of Britain. The youngest Conservative candidate is Taylor Muir, 19, standing in Rutherglen and Hamilton West. The youngest candidate who became an MP in the election is Mhairi Black, 20, of the SNP, who became the youngest MP since 1667 (prior to the Acts of Union) after she defeated Labour's Douglas Alexander in the Paisley and Renfrewshire South constituency. Tracy McVeigh,

The oldest candidate is Doris Osen, 84, of the Elderly Persons' Independent Party (EPIC), who is standing in Ilford North. Other oldest candidates standing in the election include two longtime Labour MPs standing for reelection: Sir Gerald Kaufman, 84, of Manchester Gorton, and Dennis Skinner, 83, of Bolsover.

=== Ethnic background ===
According to UCL's Parliamentary Candidates UK project, of the major parties, the major parties had the following percentages of black and ethnic minority candidates: the Conservatives 11%, the Liberal Democrats 10%, Labour 9%, UKIP 6%, the Greens 4%. About 17% of the British population as a whole identifies as black or ethnic minority. Neither UKIP nor the Greens selected a black or ethnic minority candidate to stand in a seat viewed as winnable. The Green leader, Natalie Bennett, stated that "I would agree that our percentage of BME candidates is disappointing and it's something we very much want to focus on."

A total of 158 British Asians (i.e., Britons of South Asian descent) stood for election: 111 men and 47 women. The Conservatives are standing 36 British Asian candidates, Labour 34, the Liberal Democrats 32, UKIP 21, the Greens eight, the Communities United Party four, the SNP one, and assorted other parties 17. Five British Asians stood as independents. British Indians are the largest non-white ethnic grouping in Britain, and the votes of the British Indian community were seen as critical.

The 2015 election featured the first Sikh candidate to stand in a Northern Ireland constituency: Amandeep Singh Bhogal, a Conservative standing in Upper Bann.

=== Former MPs standing against each other ===
Unusually, three former MPs competed against each other in a single seat, Northampton North. There, Conservative Michael Ellis, who was elected to the seat in 2010; Labour candidate Sally Keeble, who was a Labour MP for the seat from 1997 to 2010; and Green candidate Tony Clarke, who was a Labour MP for neighbouring Northampton South from 1997 to 2005 before leaving the party, are all competing against each other. It is not unusual for two former MPs to compete in an election (often a rematch), but it is rare for three former MPs to contest a single seat.

== Pan-United Kingdom ==
The Conservatives stood in 647 constituencies; every seat in Great Britain except for the Speaker's seat, and 16 of the 18 Northern Ireland seats. UKIP stood in 624 seats (up from 572 in 2010). (Note: After nominations had closed and ballot papers were printed, the UKIP candidate in West Lancashire, Jack Sen, was suspended from the party for making an anti-Semitic tweet.)

By tradition, none of the major parties stand candidates against the speaker of the House of Commons (currently John Bercow). However, the Greens and UKIP stood candidates against the speaker.

== Great Britain ==
The Conservatives, Labour (Note: After nominations had closed and ballot papers were printed, the Labour candidate in Banff and Buchan, Sumon Hoque, was suspended from the Labour Party when he was charged with multiple driving offences, and the Labour candidate in Wellingborough, Richard Garvie, was also suspended after a conviction for fraud) and the Liberal Democrats stood in 631 seats in Great Britain (all save the Speaker's seat). The Greens across England, Scotland and Wales stood in 568 seats (up from 331 in 2010).

Among the minor parties:

- The Trade Unionist and Socialist Coalition stood 135 candidates, including seven joint candidates with Left Unity.
- The English Democrats, led by Robin Tilbrook, stood 32 candidates.
- Cannabis is Safer than Alcohol (Cista) stood 32 candidates (in London, Scotland, and Northern Ireland).
- The Christian Peoples Alliance stood 17 candidates.
- The Monster Raving Loony Party, a parody party, stood 15 candidates.
- Yorkshire First stood 14 candidates.
- The National Health Action Party (NHA) stood 13 candidates, all in England.
- The Socialist Party of Great Britain stood 10 candidates.
- The Communist Party of Britain stood nine candidates.
- The Christian Party (UK) stood nine candidates.
- The British National Party stood eight candidates—many fewer than 2010, when it stood 338 candidates.
- Mebyon Kernow stood candidates in all six constituencies in Cornwall, as they did in 2010.
- Pirate Party UK stood six candidates.
- The Above and Beyond Party stood five candidates in England and Wales; its manifesto is almost exclusively aimed at creating a "none of the above" option on all ballots for future general elections.
- Respect Party stood in four seats, down from eleven in 2010.
- The North East Party, formed in 2014 and led by former Labour MP Hilton Dawson, stood four candidates in North East England.
- The Liberal Party, led by Liverpool City Council member Steve Radford, stood four candidates.

== Wales ==
The Conservatives, Labour, Liberal Democrats, UKIP and Plaid Cymru stood candidates across all 40 constituencies in Wales.

== Scotland ==
A total of 346 candidates stood in Scotland's 59 constituencies. The SNP, Labour, Conservatives, and Liberal Democrats are standing candidates in every Scottish constituency; UKIP in 41; the Scottish Greens in 31; the Scottish Trade Unionist and Socialist Coalition in 10, including one joint candidate with Left Unity; Cannabis Is Safer Than Alcohol in 8; the Scottish Socialist Party in four; the National Front and the Scottish Christian Party in two, and the Scottish Communist Party, and the Socialist Equality Party in one each. There are also ten independent candidates standing for election in Scottish constituencies.

== Northern Ireland ==
A total of 138 candidates stood in Northern Ireland's 18 constituencies. Sinn Féin, the SDLP and Alliance stood in all 18; the DUP in 16 (having made an electoral pact to support the UUP in two constituencies); the Conservatives in 16; the UUP in 15 (having made an electoral pact to support the DUP in two constituencies; they also did not stand in North Down against Sylvia Hermon); UKIP in ten; TUV in seven, the Greens in five, and the Workers' Party in five. Cannabis is Safer than Alcohol had 4 candidates and People Before Profit one. Five independent candidates stood in Northern Ireland, including incumbent Lady Hermon.

In Northern Ireland, the fewest candidates in a constituency was five (in Fermanagh and South Tyrone and Newry and Armagh); the most was 10 in North Down. Overall, women made up 25% of candidates in Northern Ireland. One constituency only had male candidates (Belfast West), while only one constituency had more female than male candidates (Fermanagh and South Tyrone). The DUP and UKIP (in Northern Ireland) had no female candidates.

== Table ==
Party	Candidates in previous election	Candidates in current election
Conservative	631	647
Labour	631	631
Liberal Democrats	631	631
UKIP	558	624
Green	334	573
Green	334	573
Green (NI)	334	573
TUSC	37	135
SNP	59	59
Plaid Cymru	40	40
English Democrat	107	35
CISTA	New	34
SDLP	18	18
Alliance	18	18
Sinn Féin	17	18
CPA	17	17
DUP	16	16
Monster Raving Loony	27	15
UUP	17	15
Yorkshire First	New	14
NHA	New	13
Left Unity	New	10
Socialist (GB)	0	10
Communist	6	9
Christian	71	9
BNP	338	8
Socialist Labour	23	8
National Front	17	7
TUV	10	7
Workers Revolutionary	7	7
Class War	New	7
Pirate	9	6
Mebyon Kernow	6	6
Above and Beyond Party	New	5
Independence from Europe	New	5
Communities United	1	5
Lincolnshire Independent	3	5
Northern Party	New	5
Workers' Party	0	5
All Peoples' Party	New	4
Animal Welfare	1	4
Liberal	5	4
North East	New	4
Peace	3	4
Respect	11	4
Whig Party	New	4
Scottish Socialist	10	4
Alliance for Green Socialism	6	3
Liberty GB	New	3
We Are The Reality Party	New	3
Communist League	2	2
National Liberal	1	2
Patria Party	New	2
Patriotic Socialist Party	New	2
SDP	2	2
Socialist Equality	2	2
Something New	New	2
Young People's	New	2
British Democrats	New	1
Wessex Regionalists	1	1
Al-Zebabist Nation of Ooog	New	1
FUKP	New	1
People Before Profit	2	1
Total number of candidates	4150	3971
