= Candidates in the 2017 United Kingdom general election =

3,303 candidates stood in the United Kingdom general election of 2017, which was held on 8 June 2017. The deadline for parties and individuals to file candidate nomination papers to the acting returning officer (and the deadline for candidates to withdraw) was 16:00 on 11 May 2017.

The total number of candidates was 3,303; this is fewer than the 3,971 candidates who stood in the 2015 United Kingdom general election or the record 4,133 who stood in the 2010 United Kingdom general election.

== Gender ==
965 female candidates stood within this election, 29% of the total number of candidates. This was a record in percentage terms, up from 26% in 2015, but a decrease in total numbers. In Northern Ireland, 33% of candidates were female, while in Wales the figure was 31%.

Of the larger parties, the Labour Party had the largest proportion of female candidates, at 41%. 33% of Scottish National Party candidates are women, compared with 30% of Liberal Democrats and 29% of Conservative Party candidates.

== Political parties ==
The Conservative Party put forward the most candidates, standing in 638 of the UK's 650 seats. The Labour Party contested 631, the Liberal Democrats 629, the various Green parties (Note: There are three separate but sister Green parties in the UK: the Green Party of England and Wales, Scottish Green Party and Green Party of Northern Ireland.) a total of 467, and the UK Independence Party 378. The total number of candidates by party is shown below:

Party	Candidates
Conservative and Unionist Party	638
Labour Party	631
Liberal Democrats	629
Green Party of England and Wales	457
UKIP	378
Independent	187
SNP	59
Plaid Cymru	40
Christian Peoples Alliance	31
The Yorkshire Party	21
Alliance Party of Northern Ireland	18
Social Democratic & Labour Party	18
Sinn Féin	18
Democratic Unionist Party	17
Ulster Unionist Party	14
Official Monster Raving Loony Party	12
British National Party	10
Pirate Party	10
English Democrats	7
Green Party in Northern Ireland	7
Women's Equality Party	7
Social Democratic Party	6
National Health Action Party	5
Workers Revolutionary Party	5
Animal Welfare Party	4
Libertarian Party	4
Liberal Party	4
Alliance for Green Socialism	3
Friends Party	3
Scottish Green Party	3
Socialist Labour Party	3
The Justice & Anti-Corruption Party	3
Socialist Party of Great Britain	3
Young People's Party	3
Christian Party	2
Communist League	2
People Before Profit Alliance	2
Something New	2
Peace Party	2
Workers' Party	2
Apolitical Democrats	1
Ashfield Independents	1
Better for Bradford	1
Blue Revolution Party	1
Church of the Militant Elvis Party	1
Citizens Independent Social Thought Alliance	1
Common Good	1
Compass Party	1
Concordia	1
Demos Direct Initiative Party	1
Greater Manchester Homeless Voice	1
Humanity	1
Independent Save Withybush Save Lives	1
Independent Sovereign Democratic Britain	1
Money Free Party	1
Movement for Active Democracy	1
North East Party	1
North of England Community Alliance	1
Open Borders Party	1
Patria	1
Populist Party	1
Rebooting Democracy	1
Scotland's Independence Referendum Party	1
Southampton Independents	1
Southend Independent Association	1
Space Navies Party	1
Speaker seeking re-election	1
The Just Political Party	1
The New Society of Worth	1
Radical Party	1
The Realists' Party	1
Traditional Unionist Voice	1
War Veteran's Pro-Traditional Family Party	1
Wessex Regionalists	1

†The Labour total includes 50 Labour Co-operative candidates.

== England ==
As is traditional, the Conservative Party, Labour Party and Liberal Democrats did not stand in the constituency of the Speaker of the House of Commons, Buckingham, although both the Green Party of England and Wales and the UK Independence Party contested the seat. Otherwise, the Conservatives, Labour and Liberal Democrats stood in all constituencies, except the Liberal Democrats who did not field candidates in Brighton Pavilion and Skipton and Ripon with local parties having decided to support the Green candidates there instead.

UKIP and the Green Party of England and Wales stood in many constituencies across England, but both put up candidates in fewer seats than in 2015. In some cases, local parties opted to support other candidates: UKIP local parties stood aside to support Conservatives, while Green local parties stood aside in around 30 seats to support candidates from Labour, the Liberal Democrats, or, in one case, the National Health Action Party.

Among parties standing solely in England, the Christian Peoples Alliance stood 30 candidates, the Yorkshire Party put up 21 candidates, and the British National Party ten. The Workers' Revolutionary Party contested five seats, as did the National Health Action Party. The Animal Welfare Party, Liberal Party and Libertarian Party each had four candidates. The English Democrats, the Alliance for Green Socialism, Communist League, Socialist Labour Party, Socialist Party of Great Britain, Justice and Anti-Corruption Party, Friend's Party and Young People's Party UK stood in three seats each. The Peace Party had two candidates, and various parties stood single candidates.

Other parties standing candidates in England included the Official Monster Raving Loony Party with eleven, the Pirate Party UK with nine, the Women's Equality Party with five, and the Social Democratic Party with five, all in Sheffield. Something New stood a single candidate in England. There are also various independent candidates.

== Scotland ==
In Scotland, 266 candidates stood, down from 346 in 2015, and fewer than in many prior general elections. The Scottish National Party, Conservative Party, Labour Party and Liberal Democrats contested all 59 seats, while only 30 other candidates ran, concentrated in 23 constituencies.

The UK Independence Party are stood in ten seats, the Scottish Green Party in three, and the Scottish Christian Party in two, with one candidate from each of the Social Democratic Party, Women's Equality Party, Something New, Scotland's Independence Referendum Party and Independent Sovereign Democratic Britain. There were also ten independent candidates. For the first time in many years, the Scottish Socialist Party did not contest the election.

== Wales ==
In Wales, 213 candidates stood, a reduction from the 275 who stood in 2015. The Labour Party, Conservative Party, Plaid Cymru and Liberal Democrats stood in all 40 seats, while the UK Independence Party in 32, and the Wales Green Party in ten. Unusually, all forty members of the previous Parliament from Wales stood for reelection.

Among minor parties, the Official Monster Raving Loony Party, New Society of Worth, Pirate Party UK, and Women's Equality Party each stood one candidate in Wales, and there were a number of independent candidates.

== Northern Ireland ==
In Northern Ireland, a total of 109 candidates stood, down from 138 in 2015. Sinn Féin, the Social Democratic and Labour Party and the Alliance Party of Northern Ireland stood in all eighteen seats. The Democratic Unionist Party stood in 17, the Ulster Unionist Party in 15, and the Green Party in Northern Ireland and Conservatives in Northern Ireland both standing in seven.

In addition, the People Before Profit Alliance and Workers' Party ran in two seats each, Traditional Unionist Voice and Citizens Independent Social Thought Alliance in one each, and were are four independent candidates. The UK Independence Party, despite standing in ten seats in 2015, did not contesting any Northern Irish seats at this election.
