= Lindsey Garrett =

Lindsey Garrett is a British social housing campaigner, National Health Service care co-ordinator and political activist. Garrett is currently the Chair of the New Era Tenants Association. She is also the Something New candidate for Mayor of London at the 2016 London mayoral election.

== New Era estate ==
When Westbrook Partners attempted to evict 93 families from the New Era estate and double the rent of those left, Garrett was instrumental from preventing that from happening. Garrett was responsible for first contacting the Daily Mirror with the story and was later elected the first Chair of the New Era Tenants Association. She campaigned alongside political activist and comedian, Russell Brand. Garrett presented a petition to 10 Downing Street alongside Brand that had almost 300,000 signatures. Garrett helped lead a demonstration outside Westbrook Partner's offices in London.

== London Mayor campaign ==
Garrett has said that she is a traditional Labour voter and has always voted for Labour, but said that she feels let down by the party, in particular her local MP Meg Hillier, and that she does not think that the Labour Party care about people like her anymore.

On 14 May 2015, it was announced that Garrett would be standing as Something New's candidate for Mayor of London in the 2016 London mayoral election. She is standing on a platform of further devolution to London, electoral reform including votes at 16 and also reducing the privileges of the City of London Corporation. However, on Monday 30 November 2015, it was announced via the Something New website that she had withdrawn as candidate.
