= Trew Era Cafe =

Coordinates: 51°32′09.8″N 0°04′41.7″W

- Interactive map of Trew Era Cafe

Restaurant information
- Established: 26 March 2015
- Owner: The Forward Trust
- Location: 34 Whitmore Rd., Hoxton, Hackney, East London, N1 5QA, United Kingdom
- Seating capacity: 30

The Trew Era Café was a non-profit coffeehouse established in March 2015 in Hackney, East London. The café, opened by comedian and activist Russell Brand, was funded by profits from his 2014 book, Revolution.

The café name and logo come from its location on the New Era estate and from Brand's web series, The Trews.

In September 2016, Brand donated the cafe to The Rehabilitation for Addicted Prisoners Trust (RAPT) whose London Recovery Hub is located next door to the Trew Era Cafe.

== Background ==
During promotion for his book, Brand stated that he would use the profits to fund a social enterprise to employ former drug users in "abstinence-based recovery" and help them return to work.

The café is located on the New Era estate, whose residents faced eviction in 2014 when their rents were to be tripled by a new owner, Westbrook Partners. They campaigned against the proposed purchase by Westbrook, and Brand supported and drew attention to the residents' cause. In December 2014, Westbrook backed out and the approximately 100 families of the New Era estate ultimately were able to stay.

== Facility ==
In February 2015, work began on the facility, next to a printing shop and a barbershop. The location was formerly a clothes shop but was empty for some time. The café opened its doors on the morning of 26 March 2015, with approximately 200 people coming for the event.

Brand stated that he hopes to have a chain of self-supporting social enterprises. On the café opening, he told the crowd, "In this book, I wrote about how the way to change politics is not depending on the existing political class and the existing political system, but for us ourselves to start grassroots movements like what has happened on the New Era estate...this café is going to be run by people in abstinence-based recovery. It's a model which is not for profit, a fully self-supporting new economic enterprise."

As of July 2015, the cafe employed seven recovering addicts, who are paid £9.15 per hour, and a manager.
