= 2016 London mayoral election =

London mayoral election

- 5 May 2016
- Opinion polls
- Registered: 5,739,011
- Turnout: 45.3% ▲7.2 pp
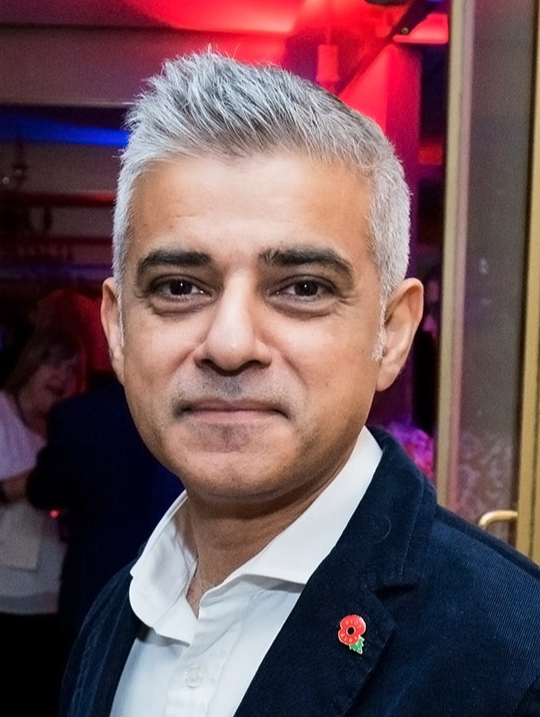

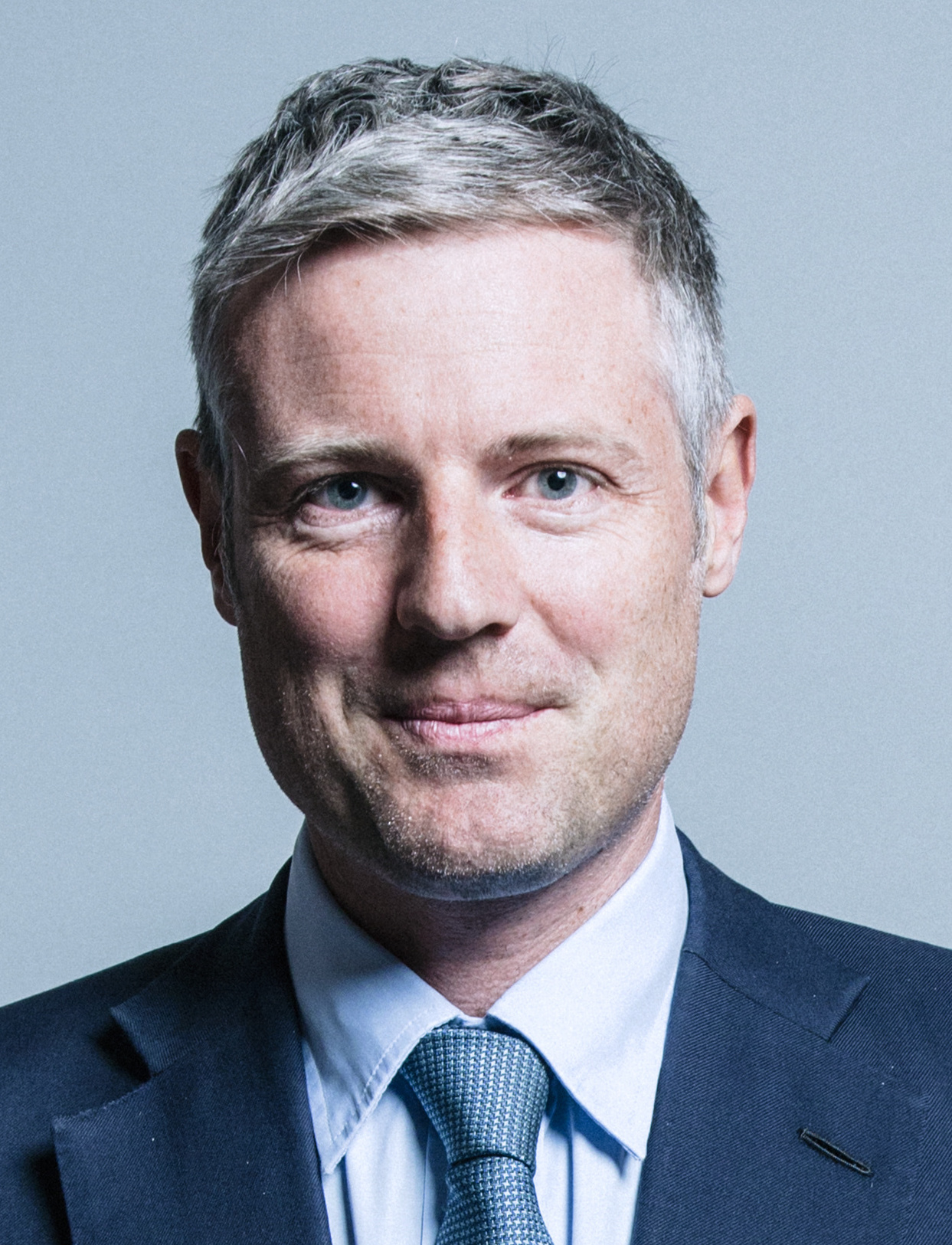

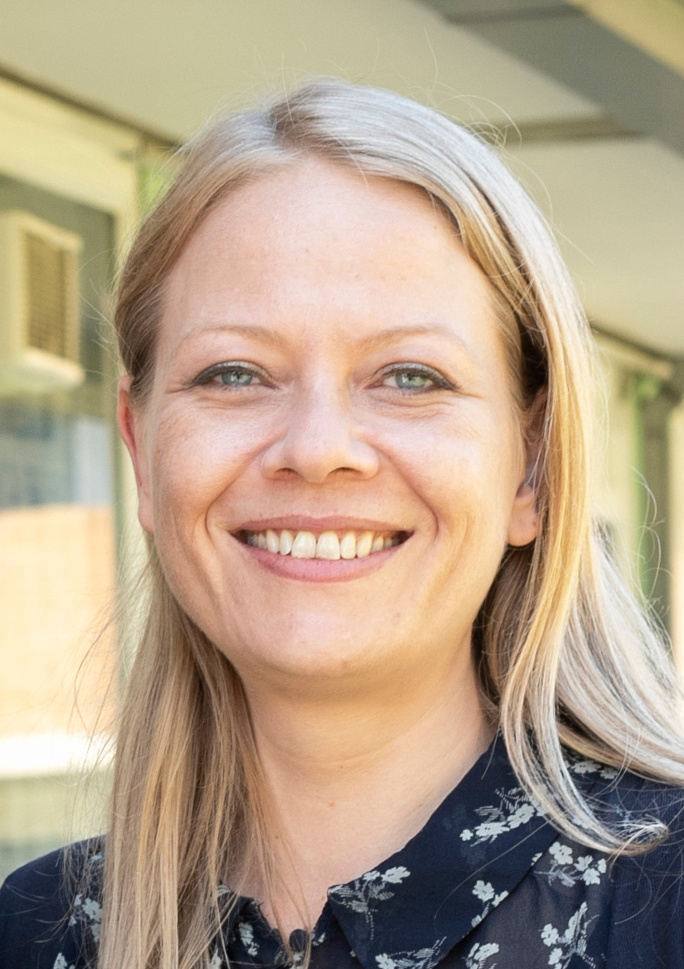
Candidate	Sadiq Khan	Zac Goldsmith	Siân Berry
Party	Labour	Conservative	Green
First Round	1,148,716	909,755	150,673
Percentage	44.2%	35.0%	5.8%
Swing	▲3.9pp	▼9.0pp	▲1.3pp
Second Round	1,310,143	994,614	Eliminated
Percentage	56.8%	43.2%	Eliminated
Swing	▲8.4pp	▼8.4pp
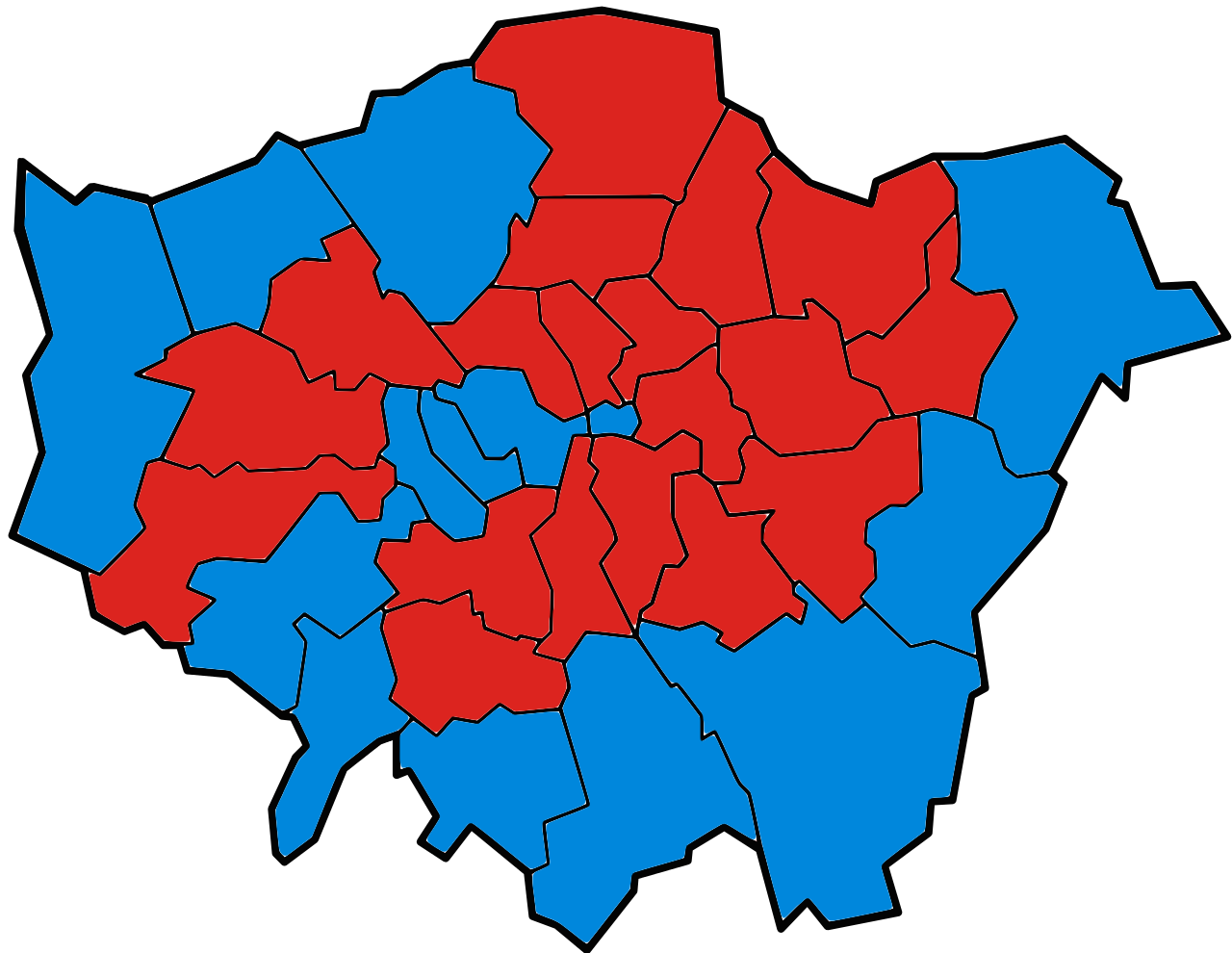
- Result of voting by London borough. Red boroughs are those with a plurality of (first-preference) votes for Sadiq Khan and blue are those with a plurality for Zac Goldsmith.
Mayor before election
Boris Johnson
Conservative
Elected Mayor
Sadiq Khan
Labour

The 2016 London mayoral election was held on 5 May 2016 to elect the Mayor of London, on the same day as the London Assembly election. It was the fifth election to the position of mayor, which was created in 2000 following a referendum in Greater London. The election used a supplementary vote system.

The election was won by the Member of Parliament (MP) for Tooting, Sadiq Khan, a member of the Labour Party, who polled 56.8% of the votes in the head-to-head second round of voting over the MP for Richmond Park, Zac Goldsmith, a member of the Conservative Party. Goldsmith was more than 25% ahead of the next candidate in the first round of voting, as part of a record field of twelve candidates. Of the twelve candidates only Khan, Goldsmith, and Green Party candidate Siân Berry achieved the requisite 5% minimum first round vote share to retain their deposit.

This was the first election to not feature either of the two previous holders of the office, Ken Livingstone and Boris Johnson, who had run against each other in 2008 and 2012. Johnson, as incumbent mayor, had chosen not to stand for re-election for a third term in office, having been elected as the Conservative Party MP for Uxbridge and South Ruislip at the 2015 general election. The campaign was dominated by the personal battle between Goldsmith and Khan, and their contrasting class and ethnic backgrounds. Through his victory, Khan became the second Labour Party mayor of London after Livingstone, and the first Muslim mayor of a European Union capital city.

The campaign of Goldsmith was marred by accusations of Islamophobia. Senior Muslim figures within the Conservative Party supported the accusations while the Muslim Council of Britain described Goldsmith's campaign as an example of Tory "dog whistle anti-Muslim racism" and called the party to investigate Goldsmith as part of an investigation into alleged Islamophobia in the Conservative party.

== Background ==
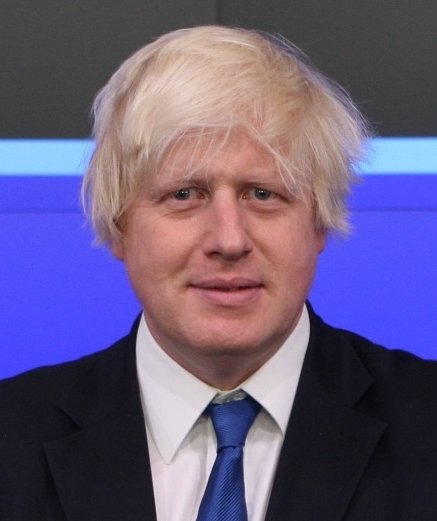
The outgoing mayor of London, Boris Johnson. The 2016 mayoral election was the first in which the incumbent mayor did not stand for re-election.

The position of mayor of London was created in 2000 after a referendum in London. The mayor has a range of responsibilities covering policing, transport, housing, planning, economic development, arts, culture and the environment, controlling a budget of around £17 billion per year. Mayors are elected for a period of four years, with no limit to the number of terms served.

Prior to the 2016 election, there had been two mayors since the position's creation. The outgoing mayor, Boris Johnson of the Conservative Party was elected mayor in 2008, defeating incumbent Labour Party mayor Ken Livingstone. Johnson was re-elected, again ahead of Livingstone, in the 2012 election. Neither Livingstone nor Johnson stood in 2016, making it the first London mayoral election that Livingstone did not contest, and the first time a mayor had chosen not to defend their position.

Since the previous mayoral vote, Labour had taken the majority of London votes and seats at the 2015 General Election, despite the Conservative Party winning the vote nationally. Ten further candidates contested the election; of these the UK Independence Party (UKIP) (8.1%), the Liberal Democrats (7.7%, 1 seat) and the Green Party (4.7%) had been the most popular parties in London at the 2015 election.

== Electoral system ==
The election used a supplementary vote system, in which voters express a first and a second preference of candidates.

- If a candidate receives over 50% of the first preference vote the candidate wins.
- If no candidate receives an overall majority, i.e., over 50% of first preference votes, the top two candidates proceed to a second round and all other candidates are eliminated.
- The first preference votes for the remaining two candidates stand in the final count.
- Voters' ballots whose first and second preference candidates are eliminated are discarded.
- Voters whose first preference candidates have been eliminated and whose second preference candidate is in the top two have their second preference votes added to the count.

This means that the winning candidate has the support of a majority of voters who expressed a preference among the top two.

All registered electors (British, Irish, Commonwealth and European Union citizens) living in London aged 18 or over on 5 May 2016 were entitled to vote in the mayoral election. Those who were temporarily away from London (for example, away working, on holiday, in student accommodation or in hospital) were also entitled to vote in the mayoral election. The deadline to register to vote in the election was midnight on 19 April 2016. However, the Electoral Commission warned that thousands of transient renters were not eligible to vote.

== Candidates and their selection processes ==
The elected mayor governs Greater London

London Mayoral Election 2016 Candidates
Party	Candidate
Green Party of England and Wales	Siân Berry
British National Party	David Furness
Respect Party	George Galloway
Britain First	Paul Golding
Conservative Party	Zac Goldsmith
Cannabis Is Safer Than Alcohol	Lee Harris
Labour Party	Sadiq Khan
One Love Party	Ankit Love
Liberal Democrats	Caroline Pidgeon
Women's Equality Party	Sophie Walker
UK Independence Party	Peter Whittle
Independent	John Zylinski

The nomination period for mayoral candidates was from 21 to 31 March 2016. Confirmation of candidates occurred after nominations closed, which revealed a record number of candidates for a London Mayoral election Among other requirements, candidates had to: be over 18; submit the signatures of 330 supporters (ten from each borough); pay a £10,000 deposit, refundable to candidates receiving more than 5% of first choice votes; and not have been sentenced to a prison term of three months or more in the previous five years. (Note: A thirteenth prospective candidate submitted nomination forms, but they were rejected for being incomplete and containing "duplicate signatures".) The full list of candidates was released on 1 April 2016, though many parties had gone through extensive selection processes prior to this.

=== Conservative Party ===
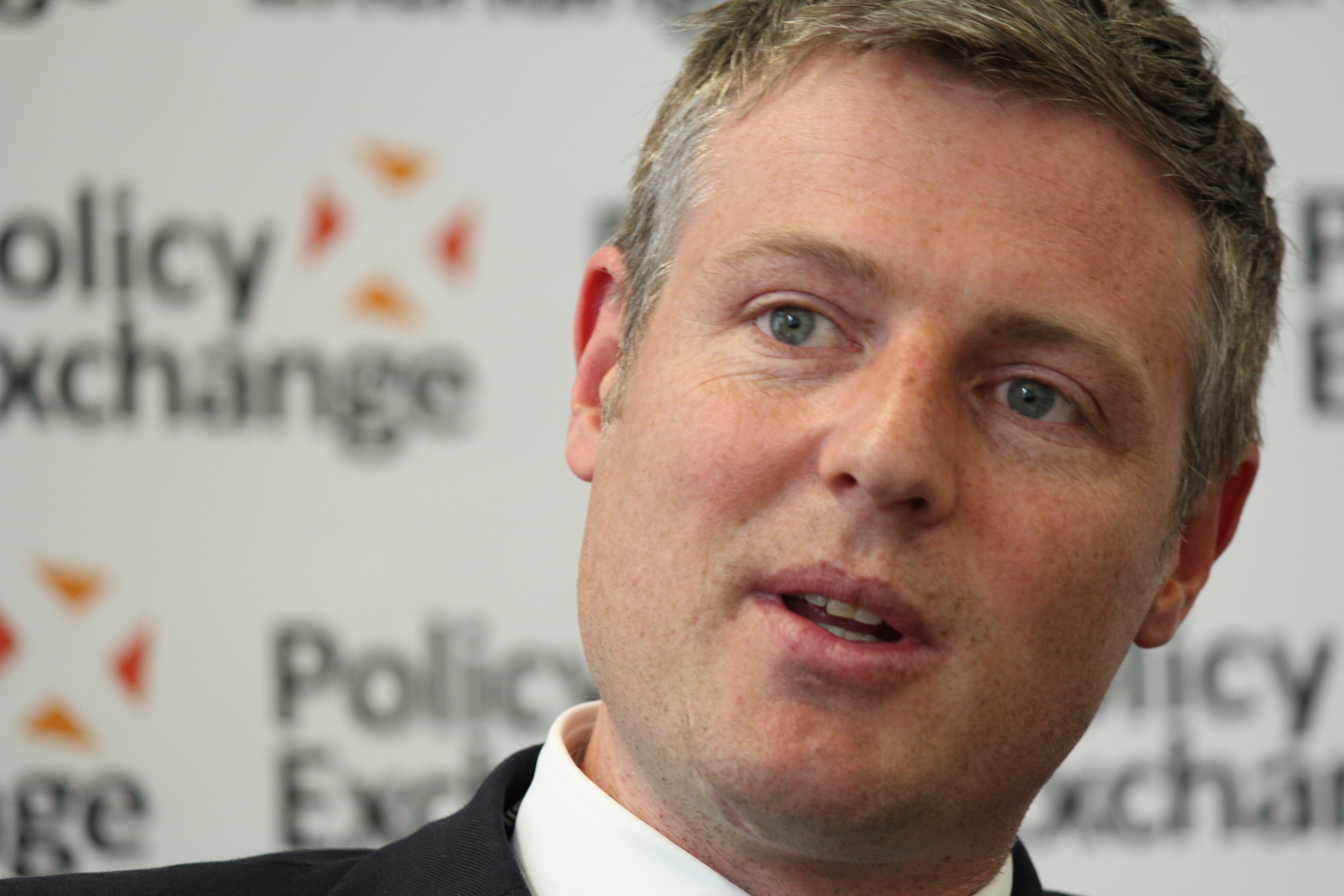
Zac Goldsmith, Conservative candidate

Seven people registered to be the candidate for the Conservative Party. Of these, three were eliminated: Philippa Roe, leader of Westminster City Council; Ivan Massow, financial services entrepreneur, LGBTQ rights campaigner, and media personality; and Sol Campbell, former Arsenal and England football player. Four nominees went into a primary, with registration open anyone on the London electoral roll. The candidate was announced on 2 October 2015 to be Zac Goldsmith, journalist, author and MP for Richmond Park. The defeated nominees were: Andrew Boff, leader of the Conservative Party in the London Assembly; Stephen Greenhalgh, businessman and Deputy Mayor for Policing and Crime; and Syed Kamall, academic, Chairman of the European Conservatives and Reformists, and an MEP for London.

Election	Political result	Candidate	Party	Votes	%	±%
Conservative Party Candidate Selection; Turnout: 9,227	Conservative Zac Goldsmith selected as Candidate for Mayor of London; Majority: 5,037 (54.6%)	Zac Goldsmith	Conservative	6,514	70.6	
Conservative Party Candidate Selection; Turnout: 9,227	Conservative Zac Goldsmith selected as Candidate for Mayor of London; Majority: 5,037 (54.6%)	Syed Kamall	Conservative	1,477	16.0	
Conservative Party Candidate Selection; Turnout: 9,227	Conservative Zac Goldsmith selected as Candidate for Mayor of London; Majority: 5,037 (54.6%)	Stephen Greenhalgh	Conservative	864	9.4	
Conservative Party Candidate Selection; Turnout: 9,227	Conservative Zac Goldsmith selected as Candidate for Mayor of London; Majority: 5,037 (54.6%)	Andrew Boff	Conservative	372	4.0	

Goldsmith, a member of the prominent Goldschmidt family, grew up in Ham, London. His early career was spent working in think-tanks and for The Ecologist magazine, of which he was editor from 2000 until 2006. He left The Ecologist in 2006 when he became deputy chairman of the Conservative Party's Quality of Life Policy Group, and he was elected as Conservative MP for Richmond Park at the 2010 general election. As a social and economic liberal, Goldsmith has campaigned for a small state with direct democracy. Goldsmith, having made his name editing an environmentalist magazine, opposed expansion of Heathrow and vowed to continue investment in public transport. He stated that he was in favour of "right-to-buy" schemes for buying homes, and wanted to expand housing stock through high-density, low-rise construction. Goldsmith announced his support for the UK leaving the European Union, reflecting his eurosceptic position. Goldsmith's aristocratic background was commented on, particularly in contrast to Khan's working-class roots, though some suggested this could have given Goldsmith an advantage.

=== Labour Party ===
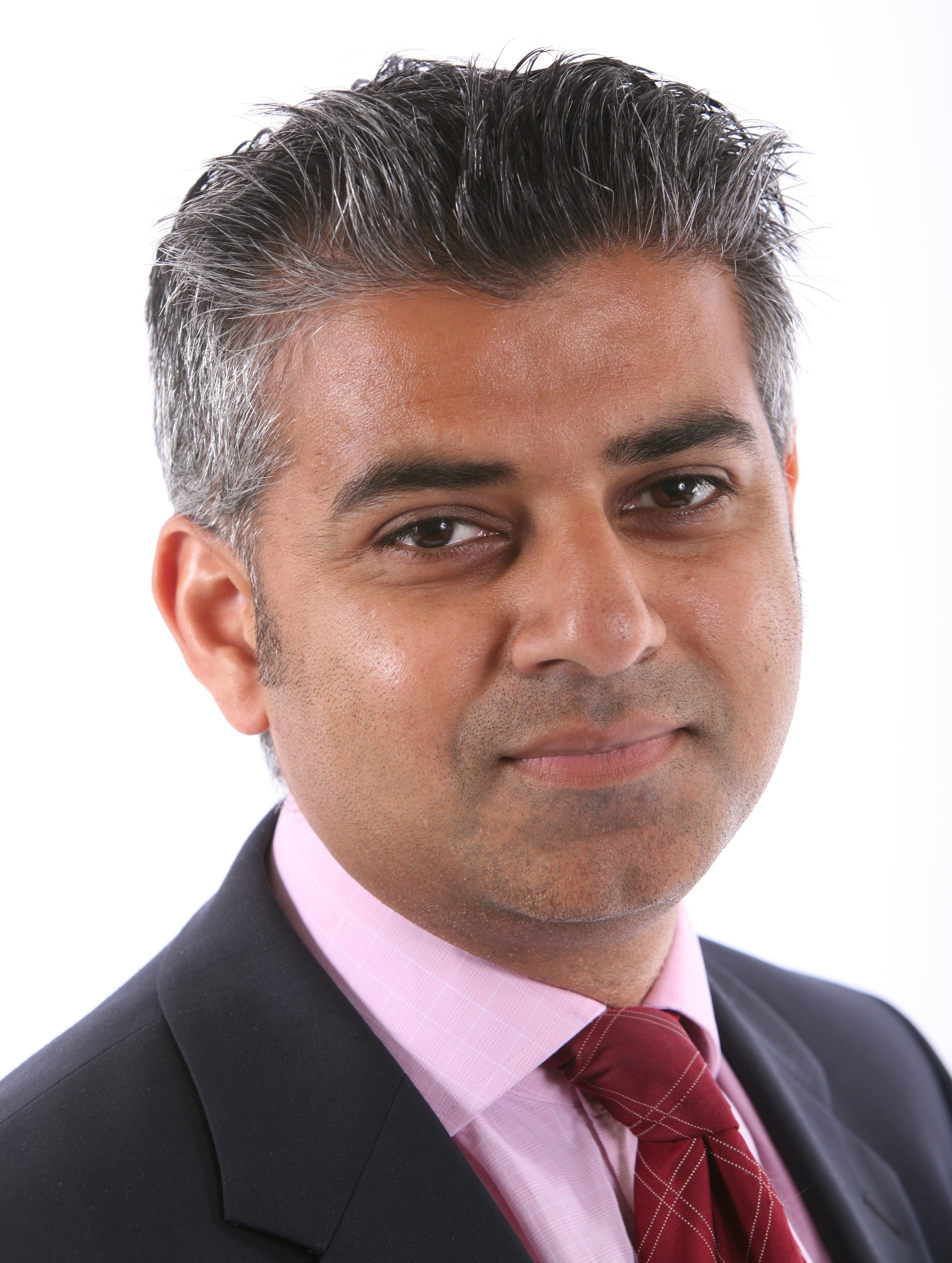
Sadiq Khan, Labour candidate

Eight politicians registered an interest in becoming the Labour Party candidate, of whom two—Keran Kerai, Labour Party member in Harrow East and Neeraj Patil, former Mayor of Lambeth and former Lambeth Borough Councillor for Larkhall Ward—were not shortlisted. Between 14 August and 10 September, affiliated and registered supporters and members of the Labour Party in London voted for their preferred candidate. The winning candidate was Sadiq Khan, with 59% of the vote. He defeated: Diane Abbott, former Shadow Minister for Public Health, candidate for leader in 2010 and MP for Hackney North and Stoke Newington; Tessa Jowell, former Olympics Minister and former MP for Dulwich and West Norwood; David Lammy, former Universities Minister and MP for Tottenham; Gareth Thomas, Shadow Foreign Office Minister, Chair of the Co-operative Party and MP for Harrow West; and Christian Wolmar, journalist, author, and railway historian.

Khan was elected to Parliament as MP for Tooting at the 2005 general election. He had previously worked as a human rights lawyer. After being the campaign manager for Ed Miliband in the latter's successful bid to become Labour Party leader, Khan was appointed to the Shadow Cabinet as Shadow Secretary of State for Justice in 2010, a post from which he resigned after the 2015 General Election and Miliband's resignation as Labour leader.

First round
Candidate	Party members		Registered supporters		Affiliated supporters		Total	
Candidate	Votes	%	Votes	%	Votes	%	Votes	%
Sadiq Khan	17,518	33.8%	11,077	42.1%	4,331	44.1%	32,926	37.5%
Tessa Jowell	19,324	37.3%	4,442	16.9%	2,355	24.0%	26,121	29.7%
Diane Abbott	6,890	13.3%	6,216	23.6%	1,692	17.2%	14,798	16.8%
David Lammy	5,191	10.0%	2,318	8.8%	746	7.6%	8,255	9.4%
Christian Wolmar	2,195	4.2%	1,997	7.6%	537	5.5%	4,729	5.4%
Gareth Thomas	650	1.3%	241	0.9%	164	1.7%	1,055	1.2%

Second round
Candidate	Party members		Registered supporters		Affiliated supporters		Total	
Candidate	Votes	%	Votes	%	Votes	%	Votes	%
Sadiq Khan	17,665	34.2%	11,121	42.4%	4,355	44.4%	33,141	37.8%
Tessa Jowell	19,535	37.8%	4,477	17.1%	2,394	24.4%	26,406	30.1%
Diane Abbott	6,943	13.4%	6,238	23.8%	1,710	17.4%	14,891	17.0%
David Lammy	5,279	10.2%	2,353	9.0%	760	7.8%	8,392	9.6%
Christian Wolmar	2,288	4.4%	2,057	7.8%	582	5.9%	4,927	5.6%

Third round
Candidate	Party members		Registered supporters		Affiliated supporters		Total	
Candidate	Votes	%	Votes	%	Votes	%	Votes	%
Sadiq Khan	18,433	35.8%	11,835	45.6%	4,545	46.8%	34,813	40.0%
Tessa Jowell	20,064	39.0%	4,710	18.1%	2,498	25.7%	27,272	31.3%
Diane Abbott	7,323	14.2%	6,737	26.0%	1,818	18.7%	15,878	18.2%
David Lammy	5,632	10.9%	2,671	10.3%	844	8.7%	9,147	10.5%

Fourth round
Candidate	Party members		Registered supporters		Affiliated supporters		Total	
Candidate	Votes	%	Votes	%	Votes	%	Votes	%
Sadiq Khan	20,628	40.5%	12,944	50.7%	4,868	50.7%	38,440	44.7%
Tessa Jowell	21,851	43.0%	5,237	20.5%	2,697	28.1%	29,785	34.6%
Diane Abbott	8,396	16.5%	7,345	28.8%	2,043	21.3%	17,784	20.7%

Fifth round
Candidate	Party members		Registered supporters		Affiliated supporters		Total	
Candidate	Votes	%	Votes	%	Votes	%	Votes	%
Sadiq Khan ✓	24,983	51.0%	17,179	73.0%	5,990	65.2%	48,152	58.9%
Tessa Jowell	24,019	49.0%	6,351	27.0%	3,203	34.8%	33,573	41.1%

Khan's selection as a candidate was seen as part of a wider move towards the left in Labour that emerged during the 2015 leadership election that followed Miliband's resignation. Key policies that Khan proposed included a London 'living rent'; a quota system for ethnic minority officers in the Metropolitan Police; increased home building; and a campaign for a London Living Wage. Commentators raised Khan's Muslim religion as a potential barrier to election, after a poll (not mentioning Khan by name) suggested that 31% of Londoners would be 'uncomfortable' with a Muslim mayor. Khan, who was London's first Muslim MP, argued that the election of a Muslim could encourage London to become recognised as a more cosmopolitan city. While Khan had stated that he would serve a full term as MP for Tooting if he were to become mayor of London, he later announced that would stand down as MP for Tooting if he were elected mayor.

=== Green Party ===
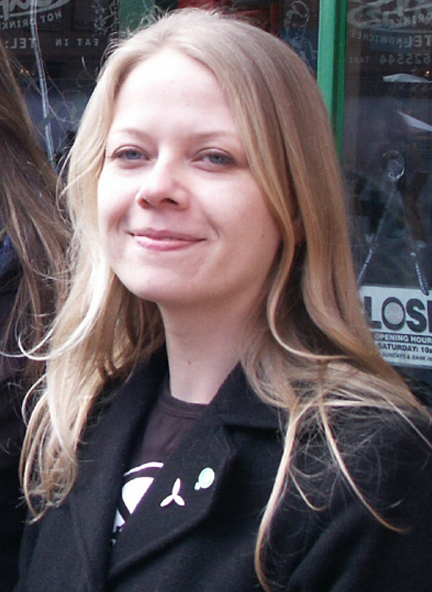
Green Party candidate Siân Berry in 2005

Jenny Jones, the Green party's candidate in the 2012 election, and Natalie Bennett, leader of the Green Party of England and Wales, declined to stand for the Green nomination. Six candidates were shortlisted for the nomination, with Siân Berry, the party's candidate in the 2008 election, selected by London-based members of the Green Party. Unsuccessful nominees were Jonathan Bartley (candidate for Streatham in the 2015 general election, co-founder of Ekklesia, and Work and Pensions Spokesperson for the Green Party); Tom Chance (candidate for Lewisham West and Penge in the 2015 general election and Housing Spokesperson for the Greens); Benali Hamdache (Equalities Spokesperson for the Green Party, and former National Health Service researcher); Rashid Nix (a Camera operator and candidate for Dulwich and West Norwood in the 2015 general election); and Caroline Russell (Islington Borough Councillor for Highbury East Ward since 2014 and clean air campaigner).

Election	Political result	Candidate	Party	Votes	%	±%
Green Party Candidate Selection; Turnout: 1,890 (16.4%)	Green Siân Berry selected as Candidate for Mayor of London; Majority: ~686 (36.3%)	Siân Berry	Green	~943	49.9	
Green Party Candidate Selection; Turnout: 1,890 (16.4%)	Green Siân Berry selected as Candidate for Mayor of London; Majority: ~686 (36.3%)	Jonathan Bartley	Green	~257	13.6	
Green Party Candidate Selection; Turnout: 1,890 (16.4%)	Green Siân Berry selected as Candidate for Mayor of London; Majority: ~686 (36.3%)	Caroline Russell	Green	~251	13.3	
Green Party Candidate Selection; Turnout: 1,890 (16.4%)	Green Siân Berry selected as Candidate for Mayor of London; Majority: ~686 (36.3%)	Rashid Nix	Green	~204	10.8	
Green Party Candidate Selection; Turnout: 1,890 (16.4%)	Green Siân Berry selected as Candidate for Mayor of London; Majority: ~686 (36.3%)	Tom Chance	Green	~159	8.4	
Green Party Candidate Selection; Turnout: 1,890 (16.4%)	Green Siân Berry selected as Candidate for Mayor of London; Majority: ~686 (36.3%)	Benali Hamdache	Green	~72	3.8	
Green Party Candidate Selection; Turnout: 1,890 (16.4%)	Green Siân Berry selected as Candidate for Mayor of London; Majority: ~686 (36.3%)	Re-open Nominations	RON	~4	0.2	

Berry joined the Green Party at age 28, and became a prominent green transport campaigner. She was Principal Speaker of the Green Party from 2006 to 2007, before becoming the Green candidate for the 2008 mayoral election. She first stood for election at Camden Borough Council in 2002, and was elected to the council in May 2014. Having had a variety of jobs, at the time of the election she was primarily an author and worked for the Campaign for Better Transport. Berry made increasing affordable housing a key policy area in her mayoral campaign, through brownfield building, capping rents and preventing foreign businesses from purchasing homes. She aimed to prioritise sustainability oriented policies over those that seek economic growth.

=== Liberal Democrats ===
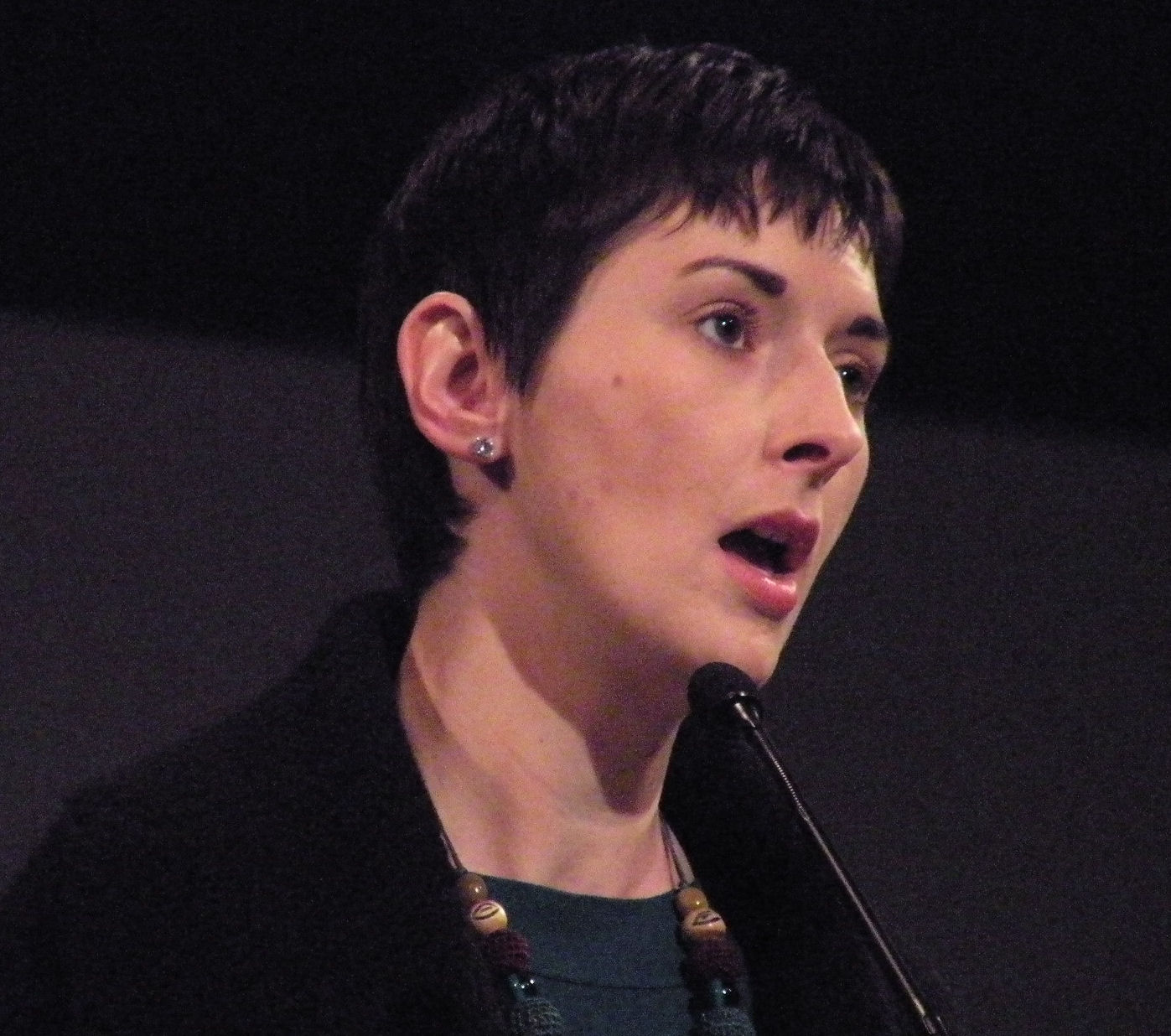
Caroline Pidgeon, Liberal Democrat candidate

The Liberal Democrats opened their selection process on 8 June 2015. Applications were due by noon on 22 June 2015 and six potential nominees stood to be candidates. Four of these were not shortlisted: Brian Haley, a former Labour councillor in Haringey, who also unsuccessfully stood for the Liberal Democrat candidacy in 2012; Teena Lashmore, a criminologist, community activist and Liberal Democrat candidate in Bethnal Green and Bow at the 2015 general election; Marisha Ray, a former councillor in Islington; and Paul Reynolds, former councillor. Of the remaining candidates, Duwayne Brooks OBE, former councillor in Lewisham, withdrew due to his commitments to a review of police stop and search powers. This left Caroline Pidgeon, leader of the Liberal Democrats on the London Assembly, as the only remaining candidate. She was selected, winning 90% of the 3669 votes on a 39% turnout, against the option to Re-Open Nominations, as announced on 17 September 2015.

Pidgeon graduated from the University College of Wales, Aberystwyth in 1994, moving to London to work in local government and later for the National Health Service. She was elected as a councillor in Southwark in 1998, where she served until being elected to the London Assembly in 2008. She became leader of the Liberal Democrat assembly group, a position she held after their number was reduced to just 2 in the 2012 London Assembly Election, the same year in which she was awarded an MBE for public service. Pidgeon promised to focus on housing, affordable childcare, air pollution and public transport. She emphasised the need to ensure that workers can live in the city by using rent control and reducing public transport costs.

=== UK Independence Party ===
The UK Independence Party (UKIP) candidate was chosen via a selection committee, unlike previous mayoral candidate selections that had been made by London-based party members. The supposed favourite for selection among party members was Suzanne Evans, UKIP Deputy Chairman, Welfare Spokesman and candidate for Shrewsbury and Atcham in the 2015 general election. Press such as The Spectator speculated that the decision had been moved to a committee to allow for the selection of national party leader Nigel Farage's preferred candidate, Peter Whittle, Culture Spokesman and candidate for Eltham in the 2015 general election. UKIP claimed that the changed selection process was intended to produce a candidate with the potential for receiving the most votes. Whittle was eventually selected, and announced as the candidate at the UKIP party conference on 26 September 2015. No shortlist was released but others who had stated their intention to stand had included: Alan Craig, former leader of and mayoral candidate in 2008 for the Christian Peoples Alliance, and UKIP candidate for Brent North in the 2015 general election; Peter Harris, candidate for Dagenham and Rainham in the 2015 general election; Richard Hendron, LGBT activist and candidate for Brentford and Isleworth in the 2015 general election; Elizabeth Jones, candidate for Dartford in the 2015 general election; David Kurten, candidate for Camberwell and Peckham in the 2015 general election; Winston McKenzie, perennial candidate and UKIP candidate for Croydon North in the 2015 general election; and Shneur Odze, former Hackney councillor.

Whittle was born in Peckham, before studying at the University of Kent. He worked in journalism, before founding the New Culture Forum think-tank in 2006. He became UKIP's cultural spokesperson in 2013 and stood for Eltham at the 2015 general election, receiving 15% of the vote. Whittle became the second openly LGBT candidate selected by any party as a mayor of London candidate after Liberal Democrat Brian Paddick in the 2008 London mayoral election. Whittle confirmed his support the UK's exit from the European Union, stating that this would not damage London's financial industries. He pledged to work to ensure that workers can afford to live in London, and opposes further expansion of Heathrow Airport.

=== Other candidates ===
- David Furness stood for the British National Party. At the time of the election he was the party's organiser in west London and had stood in the 2011 Feltham and Heston by-election. The British National Party were de-registered by the Electoral Commission on 8 January 2016 for failing to pay the required registration fee to the Electoral Commission, putting Furness' candidacy at risk. However, the BNP re-registered in February 2016 allowing Furness to stand.
- George Galloway announced that he would stand for mayor of London as Respect's candidate, shortly after losing his seat in Bradford West in the 2015 General Election. After he was expelled from the Labour Party in 2003, Galloway joined Respect in early 2004 before serving as an MP in Bethnal Green and Bow and then Bradford West. There were reports of financial difficulties for Respect, and that Galloway might be seeking to return to the Labour Party, but he was nominated by and ran under the label of "Respect (George Galloway)".
- Paul Golding, leader of Britain First and former British National Party councillor, was announced via Facebook as their intended candidate. The announcement (which was later removed) said that Britain First "will not rest until every traitor is punished for their crimes against our country. And by punished, I mean good old-fashioned British justice at the end of a rope!" Britain First had several of their proposed running slogans banned by the Electoral Commission for being offensive. Golding, who was convicted of harassment in 2015, was on police bail during the election campaign after being arrested for wearing a military uniform with political objective.
- Lee Harris stood for the Cannabis Is Safer Than Alcohol Party.
- Ankit Love stood for the One Love Party. Love claimed to be Emperor of Jammu and Kashmir and called on British military personnel to "oust the failed regime and replace the Prime Minister with him as the senior Minister of the Crown, so he can dictate the needed legislation".
- Sophie Walker, a journalist, stood for the Women's Equality Party, of which she was the leader at the time of the election.
- Prince John Zylinski, Polish aristocrat and anti-UKIP campaigner was the only independent candidate running.

=== Withdrawn candidates ===
Several independents or candidates from minor parties announced an intention to stand but did not appear on the final list of nominees. The candidate with the highest profile was Winston McKenzie, who was selected as a candidate by the English Democrats. He had run as an independent in 2008 and had sought the UKIP nomination for 2016. In January 2016, McKenzie appeared on the reality television show Celebrity Big Brother described as the English Democrats candidate, but was not nominated for the election. McKenzie submitted nomination forms, but they were rejected for being incomplete and containing "duplicate signatures". On 8 April 2016 it was confirmed that McKenzie would be standing in a borough council by-election in Croydon to be held on the same day as the mayoral election.

Other candidates who were reported to be intending to stand but did not later appear on the nomination list include Jonathan Silberman for the Communist League, and independent candidate Rosalind Readhead. Lindsey Garrett was announced for Something New, but later withdrew.

== Media and debates ==
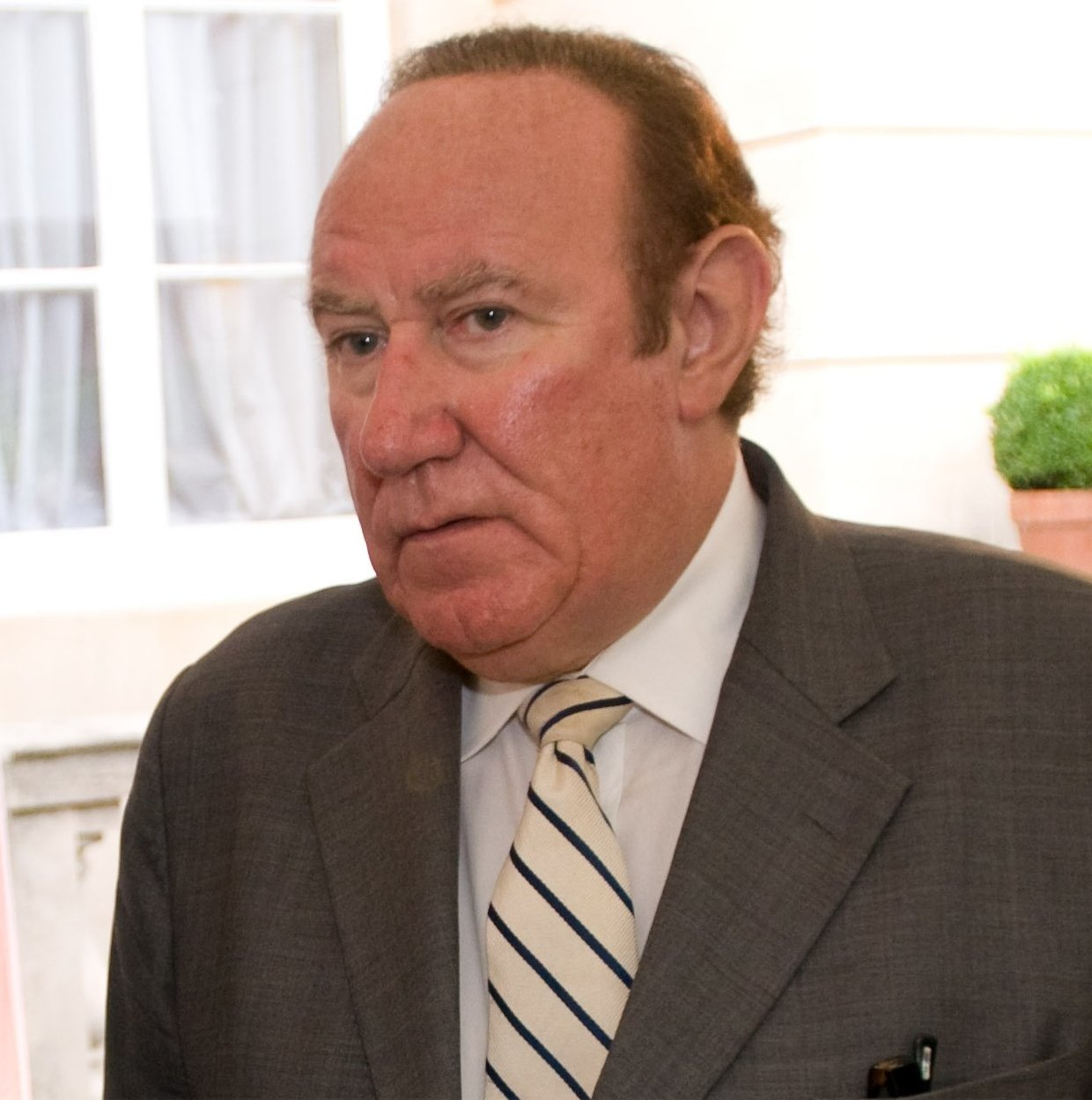
The BBC debate on 18 April between the five leading candidates was chaired by Andrew Neil

A series of debates, hustings and other events were arranged over the course of the campaign. The first major debate was hosted by the LSE on 28 January and attended by Berry, Goldsmith, Khan, Pidgeon and Whittle. Housing and transport were major topics of the debate, with Martin Hosick of MayorWatch impressed by the performances of Pidgeon and Whittle. Through February and early March a series of sponsored debates on key topics took place, including two on housing, one on technology, and one covering green issues.

The next broad debate, with the same five candidates as the LSE debate, in the campaign came on LBC on 22 March. During April, further debates occurred, with the first on 12 April a head-to-head between Goldsmith and Khan on behalf of City A.M. The issue of Goldsmith's campaign was raised, with Khan accusing Goldsmith of running a negative campaign and Goldsmith accusing Khan of hiding behind the label of Islamophobia. The topics of housing, transport and job-creation were all key points in the debate. The BBC hosted a debate with the five major candidates broadcast on BBC One in London on 18 April. The Guardian noted an absence of any clear winner, with Khan and Goldsmith focused on each other, Berry and Pidgeon offering very similar policies and Whittle distinct but with no chance of victory. Similarly, The Spectator said that there had been a lukewarm response to policy statements from all candidates. A second head to head took place on 21 April chaired by Kirsty Wark at the Royal Geographical Society on behalf of the Evening Standard. Once again, housing, security and transport were key themes in the debate.

Several national and London-based publications endorsed candidates. The London Evening Standard, the largest paper in London by circulation, endorsed Goldsmith, while the paper with the largest circulation to endorse Khan was The Daily Mirror. Of other papers with leading circulation, The Daily Telegraph endorsed Goldsmith. Khan received endorsements from The Guardian and the New Statesman, as well as a lukewarm endorsement from The Financial Times, which was critical of both leading candidates.

== Campaign ==
=== Before October 2015 ===
Early campaigning began with the process of major parties selecting candidates, after the 2015 General Election. The first party candidate to be announced was Lindsey Garrett of the Something New party on 18 May, though she later decided not to stand. The major parties all declared candidates in September. Early issues that were highlighted by multiple candidates included:

- Rising costs of house buying and renting, alongside a shortage in social housing. Candidates such as Berry and Pidgeon promised a rent cap, while both Goldsmith and Khan argued for increased home building. Caroline Pidgeon spoke out in favour of increased use of rent-to-buy loans.
- Public transport costs and the ongoing development of London's transport infrastructure, including Crossrail. Goldsmith made infrastructure a major part of his campaign, emphasising increased rail capacity. Khan promised to freeze bus and rail fares.
- Bus transport, where Goldsmith promised to allow electric cars into bus lanes, and said that busses needed to be electrified and more efficient. Khan promised a new bus ticket that would be valid for an hour.
- Cycling was supported by both Berry and Pidgeon. Goldsmith said he would judge Cycle Superhighways by their effect. Khan said he would continue to invest in them.
- Expansion of London's airports: Khan, Goldsmith, Pidgeon and Berry were all signatories to a letter vowing to use all possible powers to try and stop expansion at Heathrow, though Khan argued instead for the expansion of Gatwick Airport. Whittle also came out against Heathrow's expansion.
- Crime and police reform. Both Khan and Goldsmith highlighted rising hate crimes, with Goldsmith and Pidgeon both also pledging to tackle violent and knife crime. Berry pledged to increase resources into London's Violence Against Women and Girls Strategy.
- Environment. Several of the candidates, including Berry and Goldsmith, are long-standing environmental campaigners. Berry put sustainability at the centre of her campaign, while Goldsmith linked environmentalism more closely to economic growth, and Khan pledged a range of green policies, including a programme to plant over 2 million trees in London while mayor.

=== Early campaign: October 2015 – February 2016 ===
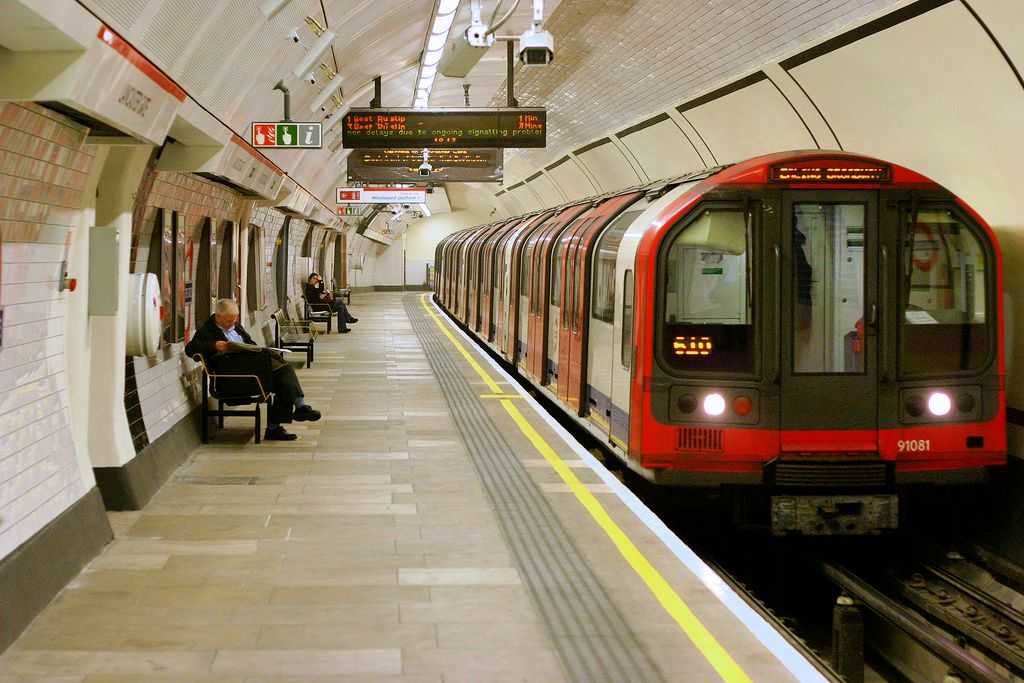
Transport costs on London's Underground system (pictured) were a key early issue in the campaign

The final polls from before the announcement of candidates gave Labour a four-point lead over the Conservative Party. From early in the campaign, the contest was presumed to be between the Labour and Conservative candidates, with both expected to comfortably reach the second round of voting. While Goldsmith – who was the last of the main candidates to be announced, on 3 October 2015 – was widely anticipated to be the Conservative candidate, Khan's selection was more of a surprise.

The first months of the campaign were dominated by the heightened terrorist threat in London, following a series of successful and planned attacks by Islamic State in 2015, particularly the November 2015 Paris attacks and a lone knife attack at Leytonstone tube station in on 6 December. Khan's comments on how British Muslims might respond to the Paris attacks raised positive comments from both supporters and opponents. A subsequent leaflet distributed by Goldmsith's campaign team described Khan as "divisive and radical", comments that Labour claimed were an attempt to associate Khan with radical Islam. The Conservative Party rejected the accusation, claiming that Khan was "playing the race card".

Elsewhere in the campaign, transport remained a major issue. David Cameron's deferral in December 2015 of a decision on plans for a third runway at Heathrow Airport until after the election was interpreted as an attempt to avoid a clash with Goldsmith, his party's candidate, on the issue. Caroline Pidgeon and Siân Berry both promised changes to the fares system to reduce commuter costs on the Tube, while Khan and incumbent Conservative mayor Boris Johnson clashed over planned Tube strikes. An early January 2016 poll gave Khan a 10-point lead over Goldsmith, with bookmakers and pundits all favouring a Khan victory, though most agreed that the race was still open. Towards the end of January, provisional English Democrats candidate Winston McKenzie appeared on reality television show Celebrity Big Brother, quickly being voted off and causing over 400 complaints to Ofcom following his negative comments about homosexuality.

In February, five candidates – Pidgeon, Whittle, Khan, Berry and Goldsmith – appeared in a debate on issues surrounding technology and science at the Queen Elizabeth Olympic Park. Key topics to emerge included the conflict between traditional London Black Cabs and Uber, and the role of the EU in shaping the British technological industry. A few days later, a referendum on the UK's membership of the EU was announced for 23 June, the campaigning for which intersected with the mayoral election. Alongside Whittle, whose UKIP party was founded with the aim of securing the UK's departure from the EU, both Goldsmith and outgoing mayor Boris Johnson announced their intention to campaign to leave the EU, in defiance of their party leader, Prime Minister David Cameron. By contrast, Khan, Pidgeon and Berry all declared their support for remaining in the EU. George Eaton of the New Statesman noted that research from the British Election Survey had found that voters in London (a majority-minority city), typically showed more support for the EU than voters in the UK as a whole.

=== Official campaign: March–May 2016 ===
In a letter intended for London's Hindu and Sikh populations, Goldsmith accused Khan, a Muslim, of wanting a "wealth tax on family jewellery". The letters formed part of what Khan's campaign said was a racist campaigning strategy from Goldsmith, with Goldsmith claiming that Khan was a dangerous and "deeply partisan politician".

March polls for YouGov and Comres showed Khan retaining his lead over Goldsmith, though by a reduced 3 percentage points in the Comres poll and an increased 7 points in the YouGov poll. The Comres poll also showed Khan leading in a run-off while neither poll gave any other candidates more than 6% of the first round votes. Both polls suggested that the race remained close, with the number of undecided voters comfortably larger than Khan's lead over Goldsmith. Meanwhile, Londonist criticised both Goldsmith and Khan for "sending substitutes" instead of appearing at hustings events across London. The official campaign began on 21 March, when nominations formally opened. The confirmed list of candidates was released on 1 April, revealing that 12 people in total had secured the support and financing required for a nomination.

Khan's manifesto launch came early in the official campaign period, on 9 March. Focusing on housing, Khan promised for database of landlords who had been prosecuted for housing-related offences, as well as the creation of a mayor-controlled not-for-profit letting agency. He pledged a freeze on rail fares and a series of measures to tackle gender inequality, focusing on domestic and sexual violence, the gender wage gap and the cost of childcare. In early April, Berry and Pidgeon both released their manifestos, with both focused on housing. Goldsmith's manifesto was one of the last to be released, on 12 April. He focused on the economy, promising that his house and infrastructure building policies would help create 500,000 jobs. He also promised a freeze on mayoral council tax and increased police numbers. Green issues were also a core part of his agenda, with new traffic regulations to encourage cleaner vehicles and the creation of new pocket parks.

Through April, the personal battle between Goldsmith and Khan continued to dominate the campaign, with Goldsmith and his campaign team repeatedly accused by Labour of racist or Islamophobic campaigning, an accusation that they strongly denied. Other candidates struggled to gain publicity and none of the major candidates were able to differentiate themselves significantly on policy. On 22 April, a YouGov poll saw Khan stretch his lead over Goldsmith to 11 points in the first round, with Whittle, Berry and Pidgeon remaining very close to each other but some 25 points further behind Goldsmith, and Khan leading Goldsmith with 60% to 40% in the final round of voting. On 29 April, comments by Labour MP Naz Shah and former Labour mayor of London Ken Livingstone led to both being accused of antisemitism. Livingstone had been a close ally of Khan, who quickly distanced himself from the comments before Livingstone was suspended from the Labour Party. A poll released on the same day showed Khan leading Goldsmith by 20 points in the second round of voting, with no other candidates on more than 5% in the first round. In the final week of the campaign, minor candidate Prince Zylinski endorsed Goldsmith.

=== Election and count ===
Election day, 5 May 2016, was affected by confusion in the London Borough of Barnet, as an undetermined number of the borough's 236,196 voters were turned away from polling stations owing to an error with the electoral lists. The first registers delivered to the polling station contained only those voters who registered since January 2016. Polls opened at 8 am and the problem was not rectified until 10:30 am. The count began on Friday 6 May taking place at three locations across the capital. The declaration, made at City Hall, was delayed following "discrepancies" with the initial count of votes, in which hundreds of votes were reportedly misallocated. As the result was announced early on 7 May, outgoing mayor Boris Johnson remained in position for a further day, handing over to Khan on 8 May.

== Opinion polls ==
In the run-up to the election, several polling organisations carried out public opinion polling on voting intentions.

=== Graphical summaries ===
==== 5 way polling ====
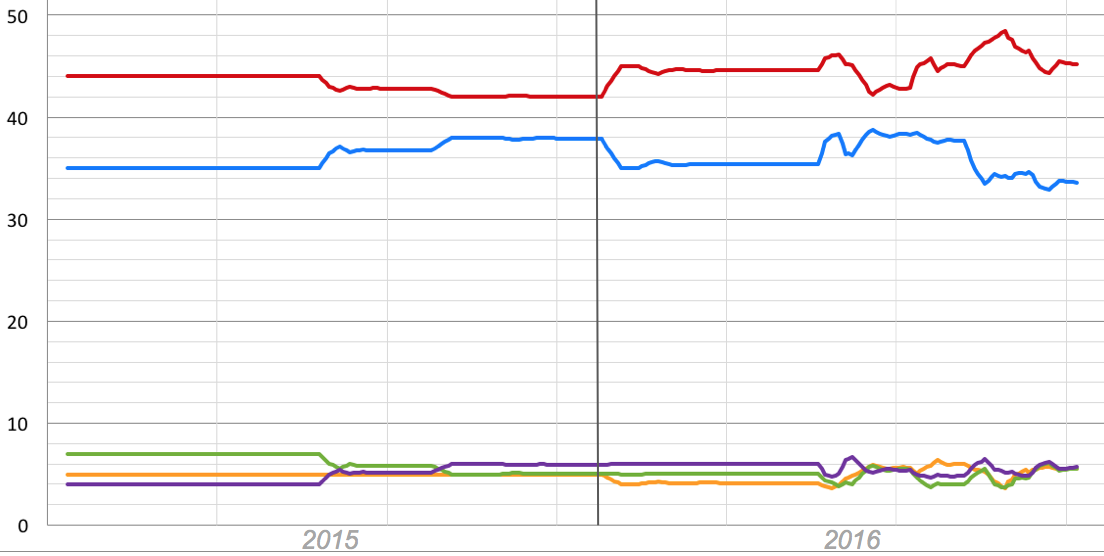
London opinion polling for the 2016 mayoral election (moving average is calculated from the last six polls) Khan Goldsmith Whittle Berry Pidgeon

==== Khan vs. Goldsmith ====
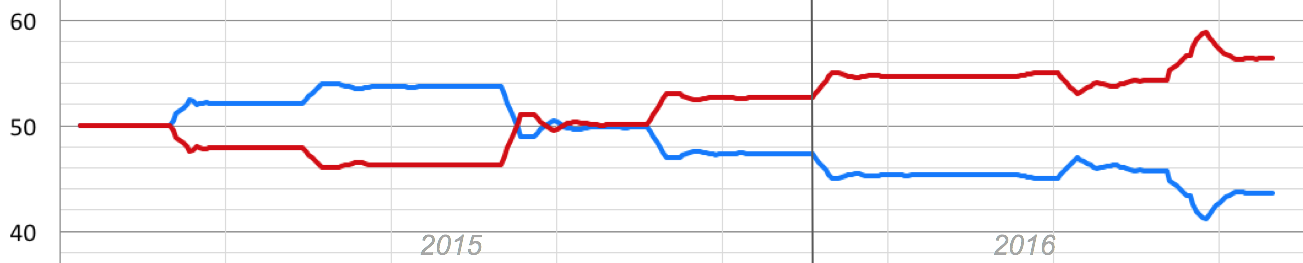
London opinion polling for the 2016 mayoral election between Zac Goldsmith and Sadiq Khan (moving average is calculated from the last six polls) Khan Goldsmith

=== 2016 ===
Date(s) conducted	Polling organisation/client	Sample size	First preference							Final round	
Date(s) conducted	Polling organisation/client	Sample size	Goldsmith	Khan	Berry	Pidgeon	Whittle	Galloway	Others	Goldsmith	Khan
5 May	2016 election	2,596,961	35.0%	44.2%	5.8%	4.6%	3.6%	1.4%	5.2%	43.2%	56.8%
2–4 May	YouGov	1,574	32%	43%	7%	6%	7%	1%	4%	43%	57%
28 Apr – 3 May	ComRes	1,034	36%	45%	6%	6%	4%	1%	2%	44%	56%
26 Apr – 3 May	TNS	1,001	33%	45%	4%	7%	5%	<1%	5%	43%	57%
26 Apr – 1 May	Opinium	1,004	35%	48%	5%	4%	5%	<1%	3%	43%	57%
21–25 Apr	Survation	1,010	34%	49%	3%	3%	5%	2%	4%	40%	60%
15–19 Apr	YouGov	1,017	32%	48%	6%	5%	7%	<1%	2%	40%	60%
30 Mar – 3 Apr	ComRes	1,049	37%	44%	4%	7%	5%	2%	1%	45%	55%
30 Mar – 3 Apr	Opinium	1,015	39%	49%	3%	4%	4%	1%	-	46%	54%
14–17 Mar	ComRes	1,011	39%	42%	6%	6%	5%	1%	1%	47%	53%
8–10 Mar	YouGov	1,031	36%	45%	4%	5%	7%	2%	1%	45%	55%
2–7 Mar	Opinium	1,011	42%	48%	3%	3%	3%	1%	-	45%	55%
4–6 Jan	YouGov	1,156	35%	45%	5%	4%	6%	2%	2%	45%	55%

=== 2015 ===
Date(s) conducted	Polling organisation/client	Sample size	First preference							Final round	
Date(s) conducted	Polling organisation/client	Sample size	Goldsmith	Khan	Berry	Pidgeon	Whittle	Galloway	Others	Goldsmith	Khan
18–21 Nov	YouGov	1,008	38%	42%	5%	5%	6%	-	3%	47%	53%
6–8 Oct	YouGov	1,178	-	-	-	-	-	-	-	49%	51%

=== Before confirmation of candidates ===
These polls were conducted before candidate details were finalised. Some show hypothetical match-ups between Zac Goldsmith and prospective Labour candidates, and others show the results of a generic question about which party a voter would support in the Mayoral election.

==== Unnamed party candidates ====
Date	Firm	Sample	Conservative	Labour	Green	Lib Dem	UKIP	Respect
12–15 Aug 2015	Survation	1,007	35%	44%	7%	5%	4%	2%

==== Zac Goldsmith vs Sadiq Khan ====
Date(s) conducted	Polling organisation/client	Sample size	Goldsmith	Khan
10–12 Aug 2015	YouGov	1,153	54%	46%
2 July 2015	YouGov	?	53%	47%
8–11 June 2015	YouGov	1,236	50%	50%

==== Zac Goldsmith vs Tessa Jowell ====
Date	Firm	Sample	Goldsmith	Jowell
10–12 Aug 2015	YouGov	1,153	47%	53%
2 July 2015	YouGov	?	43%	57%
8–11 June 2015	YouGov	1,236	42%	58%

== Results ==
The first announcement of the first round results indicated that Khan was leading. However, this count was later retracted, and official results were delayed pending counting errors that reportedly misattributed "hundreds" of votes. When the full result, including second preference, votes was announced at about 00:30, Khan had increased his lead over Goldsmith.

Mayor of London election 5 May 2016
Party	Candidate	1st round		2nd round			1st round votesTransfer votes, 2nd round
Party	Candidate	Total	Of round	Transfers	Total	Of round	1st round votesTransfer votes, 2nd round
Labour	Sadiq Khan	1,148,716	44.2%	161,427	1,310,143	56.8%	
Conservative	Zac Goldsmith	909,755	35.0%	84,859	994,614	43.2%	
Green	Siân Berry	150,673	5.8%				
Liberal Democrats	Caroline Pidgeon	120,005	4.6%				
UKIP	Peter Whittle	94,373	3.6%				
Women's Equality	Sophie Walker	53,055	2.0%				
Respect	George Galloway	37,007	1.4%				
Britain First	Paul Golding	31,372	1.2%				
CISTA	Lee Harris	20,537	0.8%				
BNP	David Furness	13,325	0.5%				
Independent	Prince Zylinski	13,202	0.5%				
One Love	Ankit Love	4,941	0.2%				
Labour gain from Conservative							

There were a total of 2,596,961 valid votes and 49,871 rejected votes in the first round. In the second round a further 381,862 had not declared a valid second preference, with a further 2,381 rejected for other reasons.

The election therefore had a turnout of 45.3%. As of 2024, this is the highest turnout in a London mayoral election since the first election in 2000.

Results by assembly constituency

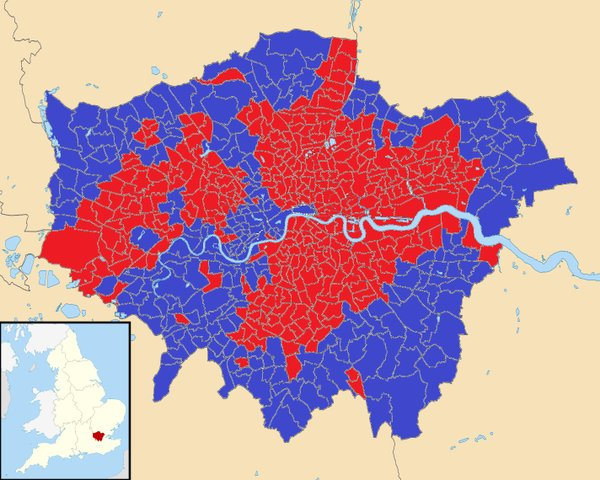
Result by electoral ward

== Aftermath ==
As the first results were announced, several Conservative Party politicians, including Andrew Boff and Sayeeda Warsi, denounced Zac Goldsmith's campaign, while writers such as left-wing columnist Owen Jones once again described it as "racist". Khan's win was described as a highlight for Labour on a day when the party had lost 19 councillors in the English local elections and fallen to third place, behind the Conservatives, in the Scottish parliament election. However, in the subsequent days, Khan distanced himself from Labour leader Jeremy Corbyn's election strategy, amidst rumours of a party rift. Khan subsequently supported Corbyn's opponent, Owen Smith, in the 2016 Labour Party leadership election.

In his victory speech, Khan said that his victory represented a victory for "hope over fear" Internationally and in the UK, many responses focused on Khan's election as the first Muslim mayor of London. Khan received congratulations from politicians globally, including French Prime Minister Manuel Valls; Hillary Clinton, who at the time was the Democratic front-runner for the United States 2016 presidential primaries; and Basuki Tjahaja Purnama, who in 2014 became the first Christian governor of Indonesia's capital, Jakarta. Khan's working-class background was also noted, particularly in contrast to the aristocratic background of Goldsmith. A week after the election, Khan announced Joanne McCartney, London Assembly member for Enfield and Haringey, as his deputy mayor.

Green Party candidate Sian Berry, who finished third ahead of Pidgeon and Whittle, received the largest number of second-preference votes of any candidate with 468,318 votes representing 21% of the total. All three were elected to the London Assembly in the vote on the same day. Sophie Walker's 2.0% of the vote was reported positively in what was the Women's Equality Party's first ever election. She also would have been elected to the Assembly on a pure D'Hondt allocation, but a 5% threshold denied her the seat. By contrast, former MP George Galloway's 1.2% of the vote was seen as something of a humiliation and a symptom that his Respect Party was struggling to function; Respect did indeed deregister from the Electoral Commission within 4 months of the election.

Khan formally resigned from his position as MP for Tooting on 9 May, triggering a by-election, which was held on 16 June. On 16 June, Rosena Allin-Khan won the by-election in Tooting, with an increased majority. A few months after the election, Goldsmith also pledged to resign as an MP if the government were to announce plans to build a third runway at Heathrow Airport. Following the decision to build the runway, Goldsmith stood-down as MP for Richmond Park, triggering a by-election, in which Goldsmith stood as an independent candidate. On 1 December 2016, Goldsmith saw his 23,000 majority overturned in the by-election by Sarah Olney of the Liberal Democrats, who achieved a 30% swing. Goldsmith's loss put down to his stance in favour of Britain's exit from the European Union where his constituency voted to remain.

In 2017, Goldsmith regained his seat by overturning Olney's 2,000 majority and winning by 45 votes. However, in 2019, Goldsmith lost his seat again to Olney, this time by a margin of 7,766 votes.
