= Something New (political party) =

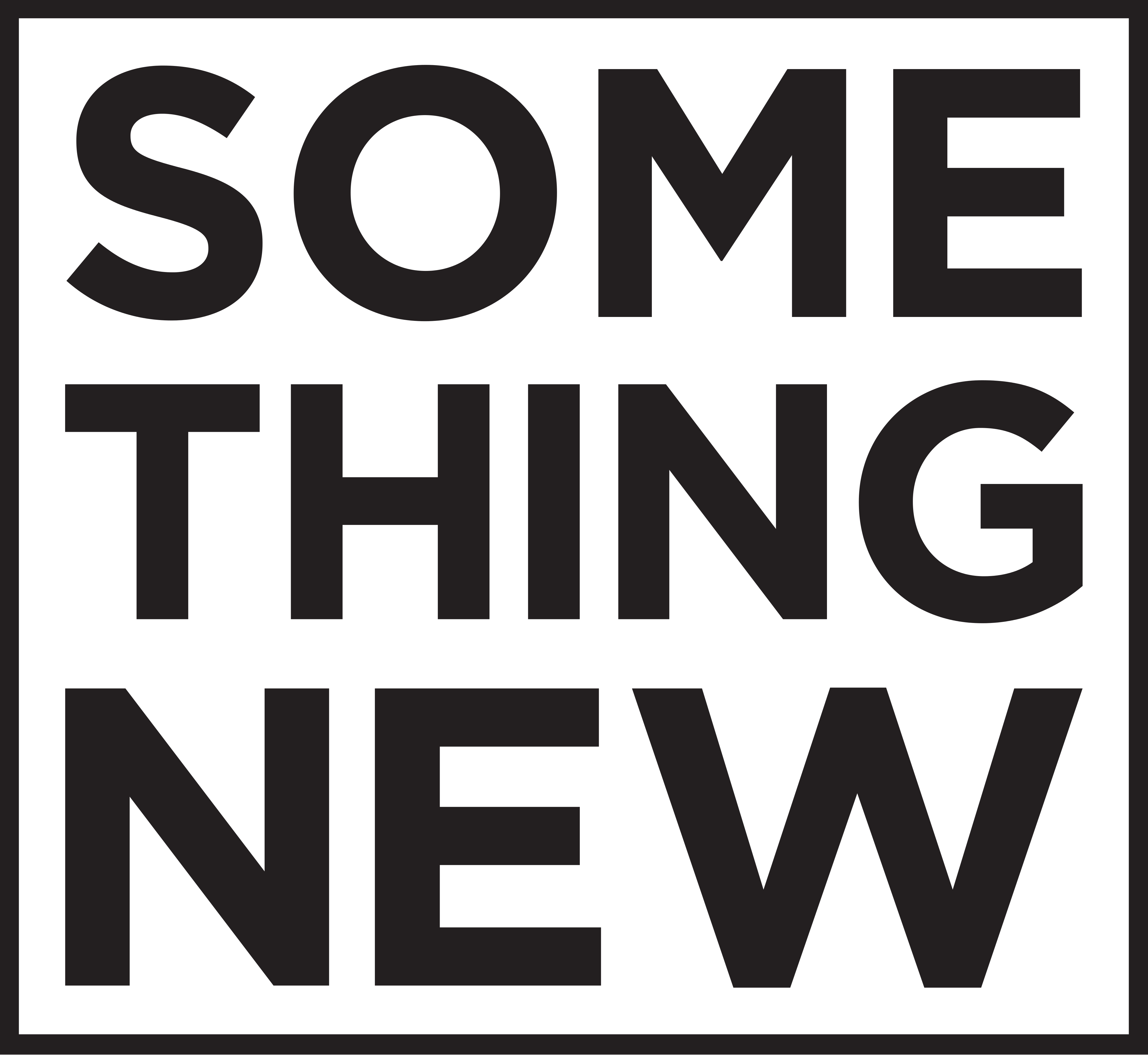
- Leader: Dr James Smith
- Nominating Officer: Paul Robinson
- Founded: October 2014
- Dissolved: 5 November 2020
- Headquarters: Vesta House, 4 Liberty Bridge Road, London
- Ideology: Radical centrism
- Political position: Syncretic
- Colours: Black and white
- Slogan: Bringing British democracy into the 21st century

Website
- www.somethingnew.org.uk

Something New was a political party in the United Kingdom, founded in October 2014. The party was primarily based on the concept of an open-source manifesto, which means that it could be described as a party of the radical centre, as it combines ideas from the left and right of politics. It could also be described as syncretic. As such, Something New has no fixed ideology and instead believes in evidence-based policy creation.

The party stood two candidates at the 2017 general election in Horsham and Ross, Skye and Lochaber, winning 0.6% and 0.5% of the vote respectively.

The party voluntarily deregistered with the Electoral Commission on 5 November 2020.

== History ==
Something New was founded in 2013, and was revived in October 2014. The party was registered with the Electoral Commission on 12 March 2015, naming Dr Raymond James Smith as its Leader, Alexander Hilton as its Treasurer and Paul Robinson as its Nominating Officer. Hilton had been the Treasurer and Nominating Officer for the first incarnation of Something New in 2013.

At the 2015 general election, James Smith, who works as a software developer at the Open Data Institute, stood for election in Horsham, which was the constituency of Francis Maude, although he stepped down ahead of the election. Smith, in his election campaign, held a series of meetings with constituents in order to "give people a choice and increase the level of debate." Smith raised the money for his campaign through the use of the crowdfunding website, Crowdfunder, and in 27 hours had already raised the £500 for his election deposit. Following the ITV Leaders' Debate on 2 April 2015, Smith filmed his own responses to the questions that were put to the leaders and posted it on YouTube.

Something New also stood a candidate in South West Surrey, Paul Robinson, a former Royal Navy officer and now a Director of Seedpod, his own business. From May 2011 to May 2015, he was a councillor on Godalming Town Council, serving from 2011 to 1 October 2014 as a Conservative, and from 1 October 2014 to 7 May 2015 as a member of Something New. At the 2015 local elections, he stood for re-election to Godalming Town Council and also for election to Waverley Borough Council. Robinson's wife, Rebecca Robinson, a fellow Director of Seedpod, also stood for Something New on Godalming Town Council.

In the run-up to the 2015 general election, Something New formed party alliances with the Whig Party, My MP 2015 and Rebooting Democracy, and it cross-endorsed candidates from both the Whig Party and Rebooting Democracy. Both Smith and Robinson signed the My MP 2015 pledge to respect the will of their constituents. Smith signed the West Sussex County Times "Free Speech Charter." Something New also recommended several Independent candidates and all the candidates being stood by the Pirate Party UK.

In the course of the election campaign, both Smith and Robinson attended several pre-election hustings. On 21 March 2015, Smith attended one husting organised by the Sussex branch of the Campaign to Protect Rural England. Robinson attended one husting in South West Surrey that included the incumbent Member of Parliament and Health Secretary Jeremy Hunt and the chief challenger, National Health Action Party candidate Louise Irvine.

James Smith stated that he wished to beat the Green Party candidate in Horsham, as the Green Party received only 570 votes at the 2010 general election with very little campaigning. However, Smith only received 375 votes whereas the Green Party candidate received 2,151. Paul Robinson came 7th in South West Surrey, winning 320 votes or 0.6% of the vote. He also came 4th in the Waverley Borough Council election in the Godalming Central and Ockford Ward, winning 485 votes.

Following the 2015 general election, Something New stood a candidate, Jessie Macneil-Brown, in a by-election in the Stepney Green Ward on Tower Hamlets London Borough Council, that was held on 11 June 2015. Macneil-Brown won just over 1% of the vote and came last out of all the candidates. Something New also intended to contest the 2016 London Assembly election. On 14 May 2015, Lindsey Garrett, Chair of the New Era Tenants Association, was announced as Something New's candidate for Mayor of London in the 2016 London mayoral election. Garrett was instrumental in removing Westbrook Partners from the estate and worked with Russell Brand and other New Era residents throughout the campaign. However, on 30 November 2015, it was announced via the Something New website that Garrett had withdrawn her potential candidacy.

== OpenPolitics Project ==
The OpenPolitics Project was launched in August 2013. It was an open-source manifesto, in that anyone was free to contribute a policy that was then discussed and subject to consensus or scrapped. It combines elements of open-source governance and also direct democracy and consensus democracy. The project was organised on GitHub and the contribution process is operated in a way similar to Wikipedia's.

The manifesto was supported by a base of active contributors, numbering roughly 25. Any candidates are open to stand on the OpenPolitics Manifesto, however only Something New and their two candidates for the 2015 general election have pledged to stand on the policies.

James Smith has said, on behalf of Something New, that the three policies that he would prioritise would be to "change the voting system to three-member single transferable vote, tackle off-shoring of profits, and target of no new fossil-fuel vehicles by 2030." Smith has also described the Manifesto as "never 'finished,' never 'published.' It's a living document, always being updated and improved."

On behalf of Something New and the OpenPolitics Project, Smith wrote an essay that was included in the Design Commission's report on "Designing Democracy." The essay appeared on pages 67 and 68 of the report in Section 4: The Stuff of Democracy. The inquiry was headed by Dr Richard Simmons and John Howell and the report was launched on 23 March 2015. Smith concluded his essay with the line, "The Open Revolution is here to change everything."

== Party leaders ==
#	Leader	Tenure	Notes
1	James Smith	2014–2020	Stood in Horsham in 2015.

== Electoral performance ==
=== Parliamentary elections ===
House of Commons of the United Kingdom
Election year	# of total votes	% of overall vote	# of seats won
2015	695	0.002%	0
2017	552	0.002%	0

==== General Election 2015 ====
Something New stood two candidates in the 2015 general election, but also endorsed candidates from other parties and recommended several candidates in constituencies where it did not nominate a candidate. It recommended that people voted for all the Pirate Party UK candidates and several independent candidates in several constituencies where it was not standing. Something New also endorsed "Allied Candidates" from the Whig Party and Rebooting Democracy.

Candidate	Constituency	Votes	%
James Smith	Horsham	375	0.7
Paul Robinson	South West Surrey	320	0.6
Total		695	

==== General Election 2017 ====
Candidate	Constituency	Votes	%
James Smith	Horsham	375	0.6
Stick Sturrock	Ross, Skye and Lochaber	177	0.5
Total		552	

=== Local elections ===
==== Local elections 2015 ====
Something New stood one candidate in the 2015 local elections: Paul Robinson in Godalming Central and Ockford Ward on Waverley Borough Council.

Candidate	Ward	Council	Votes	%
Paul Robinson	Godalming Central and Ockford	Waverley Borough Council	485	12.54

==== Stepney Green by-election (2015) ====
In a by-election in Stepney Green Ward on Tower Hamlets London Borough Council, that was held on 11 June 2015, Something New stood Jessie Macneil-Brown as a candidate. The election was called because the incumbent, Alibor Choudhury, was found guilty of corrupt and illegal practices and forced to leave his post by an election court.

Candidate	Ward	Council	Votes	%
Jessie Macneil-Brown	Stepney Green	Tower Hamlets London Borough Council	40	1.03

==== Local elections 2017 ====
Candidate	Ward	Council	Votes	%
Philip John	Lichfield City North	Staffordshire County Council	175	5
Philip John	Stowe	Lichfield City Council	101	7
James Smith	Holbrook	West Sussex County Council	199	6

== See also ==
- Open-source governance
- Direct democracy
- Consensus democracy
- Participatory democracy
