= Whig Party (British political party) =

Political party in England

- Leader: Waleed Ghani
- Founded: October 2014; 11 years ago
- Headquarters: London, England
- Ideology: Pro-Europeanism; Social progressivism Whiggism (self-declared)
- Political position: Centre
- Colours: Light blue

Website
- whigs.uk (Inactive)

The Whig Party is a political party in England which is intended to be a revival of the Whigs that existed in the United Kingdom from 1678 to 1868.

The party is led by Waleed Ghani, who launched it in October 2014. It is based on Whiggism, the ideology of the former Whigs.

== History ==
Waleed Ghani and his fiancée Felicity Anscomb applied to register the Whig Party with the Electoral Commission on 27 May 2014. The Whig Party was registered with the Electoral Commission on 15 September 2014. The Electoral Commission lists Waleed Ghani as its Leader and Nominating Officer and Felicity Anscomb as its treasurer. Ghani founded the party with the intention of filling a vacuum he saw in British politics. Jesse Norman, a Conservative Member of Parliament who in 2013 published a biography of the famous Whig politician Edmund Burke, proposed that Ghani may have exaggerated Whigs' historical progressive achievements.

On 9 December 2014, Ghani was interviewed by Jo Coburn on the BBC's Daily Politics. Ghani has also received support from American Whigs. The party was founded without any policies, but instead a group of values such as human rights, love of country and diversity, for which they use the Swedish word mångfald (meaning "diversity", "variety" or "multitude"). In early 2015, the Whig Party formed an agreement with Something New that meant both parties would cross-endorse candidates and they would not stand opposing candidates in the same seats.

On 31 March 2015, the Whig Party released their manifesto for the 2015 general election. The party is pro-European Union and pro-immigration; it supports universal childcare from ages two to four and the abolition of student tuition fees; and it defends the rights of renters in the United Kingdom in addition to women's rights and human rights around the world.

Following the 2016 referendum on UK membership in the European Union, in which the party voiced support for the "remain" campaign, the party announced that they would not field candidates in the 2017 general election. The party also fielded no candidates in the 2019 general election but is still registered with the Electoral Commission as of May 2026.

== Party leaders ==
No.	Leader	Tenure	Notes
1	Waleed Ghani	2014–present	

== Electoral performance ==
The Whig Party fielded four candidates at the 2015 general election: Waleed Ghani stood in Vauxhall, Alasdair Henderson stood in Bethnal Green and Bow and Felicity Anscomb stood in Camberwell and Peckham, all in Inner London, whereas Paul Bradley-Law stood in Stretford and Urmston in Manchester.

=== General election, 2015 ===
Candidate	Constituency	Votes
Waleed Ghani	Vauxhall	103
Alasdair Henderson	Bethnal Green and Bow	203
Felicity Anscomb	Camberwell and Peckham	86
Paul Bradley-Law	Stretford and Urmston	169
