= New Era Estate =

Housing estate in Hoxton, London

Coordinates: 51.5362°N 0.0816°W

New Era estate
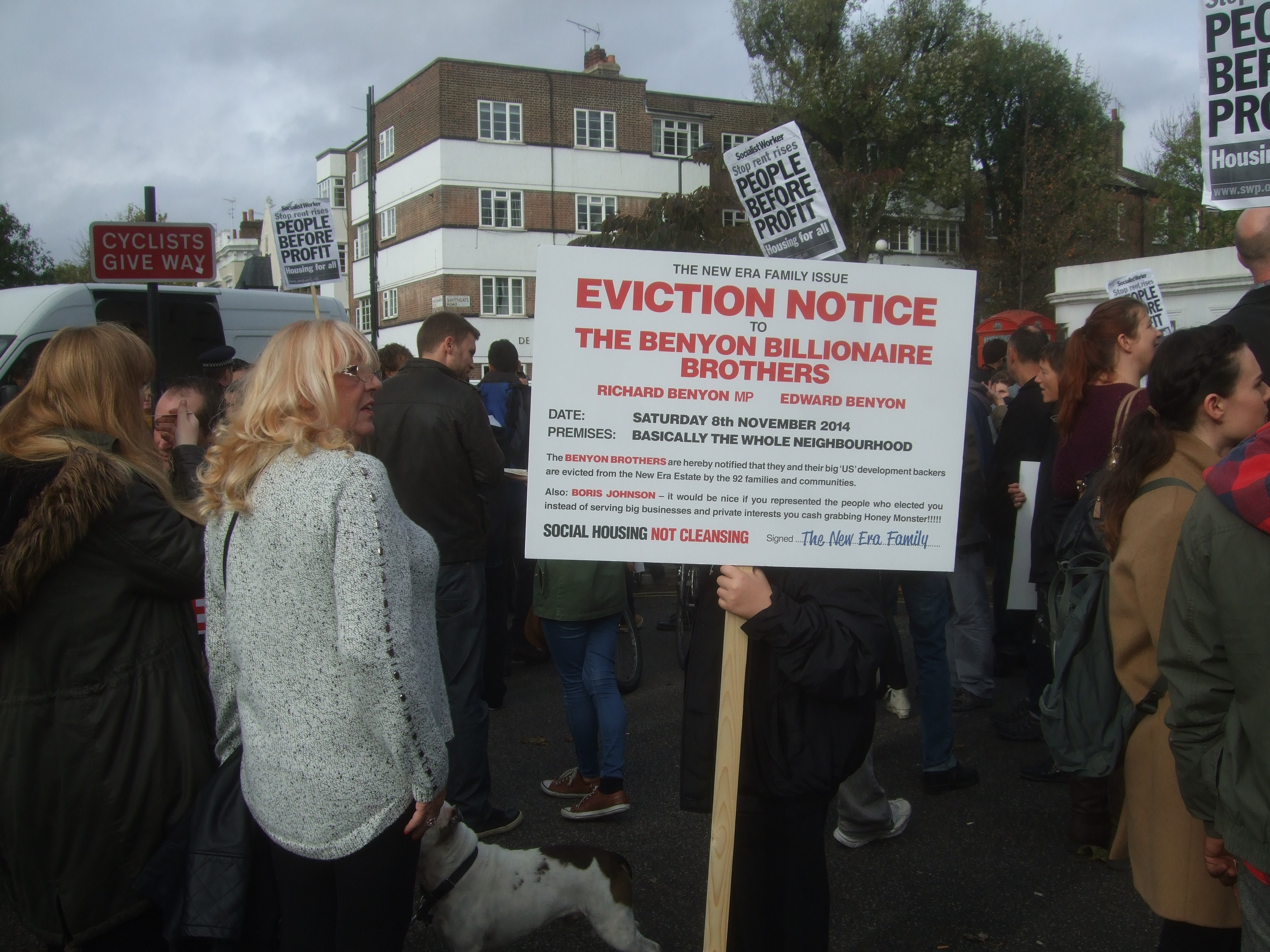
- Protestors at the New Era estate, November 2014

- Location within Greater London
- OS grid reference: TQ 33150 83665
- Ceremonial county: Greater London
- Region: London
- Country: England
- Sovereign state: United Kingdom
- Post town: LONDON
- Postcode district: N1
- Dialling code: 020
- Police: Metropolitan
- Fire: London
- Ambulance: London
- UK Parliament: Hackney South and Shoreditch

The New Era estate is a housing estate in Hoxton, in the London Borough of Hackney, part of East London. Approximately 100 families lived on the estate in 2015.

The New Era Tenants' Association of estate residents had been involved in protests over the increase in rents proposed by its new landlord, the U.S.-based investment fund Westbrook Partners. After Russell Brand joined the protests in 2014, footage of his clash with a television reporter at a 10 Downing Street demonstration in Westminster went viral on YouTube, bringing the issue to greater public notice. A petition raised 350,000 signatures in support of the residents, and Hackney Council became involved in negotiations with Westbrook Partners.

In December 2014, it was confirmed that the housing estate was to be sold to the affordable housing group Dolphin Living, a housing provider owned by the Dolphin Square Charitable Foundation.

== See also ==
- Trew Era Cafe
