= Cannabis Is Safer Than Alcohol =

- Abbreviation: CISTA
- Chairperson: Paul Birch
- Founded: February 2015
- Dissolved: November 2016
- Ideology: Cannabis legalisation

Website
- cista.org

Citizens Independent Social Thought Alliance
- Chairperson: Barry Brown
- Founded: 2017
- Ideology: Cannabis legalisation

Cannabis Is Safer Than Alcohol (CISTA) was a political party in the United Kingdom, which advocated the legalisation of cannabis.

The party was launched in February 2015. The party fielded candidates in the 2015 general election, campaigning for a Royal Commission to review the UK's drug laws relating to cannabis and to push the economic argument for legalisation, which it argued could generate £900 million in taxation. None of the candidates won a seat.

The party was deregistered by the Electoral Commission on 3 November 2016. Former members of the party from Northern Ireland registered a new party with the same initials, Citizens Independent Social Thought Alliance, in February 2017 to contest the 2017 Assembly election.

== Electoral performance ==
=== General election, 7 May 2015 ===
The party contested 32 constituencies, with its largest share of the vote coming in East Londonderry with 527 (1.5%).

Constituency	Candidate	Votes	%
Bethnal Green & Bow	Jonathan Dewey	303	0.5
Camberwell & Peckham	Alexander Robertson	197	0.4
Cities of London & Westminster	Edouard-Henri Desforges	160	0.4
Dundee, E	Lesley Parker-Hamilton	225	0.5
East Londonderry	Neil Paine	527	1.5
Eddisbury	George Antar	301	0.6
Esher & Walton	Matt Heenan	396	0.7
Glasgow, Central	James Marris	171	0.4
Glasgow, N	Russell Benson	154	0.4
Glasgow, NE	Geoff Johnson	225	0.6
Glasgow, NW	Chris MacKenzie	213	0.5
Great Yarmouth	Sam Townley	167	0.4
Guildford	Gerri Smyth	196	0.4
Hackney, S & Shoreditch	Paul Birch	297	0.6
Holborn & St Pancras	Shane O'Donnell	252	0.5
Inverclyde	Craig Hamilton	233	0.5
Islington, S & Finsbury	Jay Kirton	309	0.7
Kensington	Tony Auguste	211	0.6
Leeds, W	Matthew West	217	0.6
North Down	Glenn Donnelly	338	0.9
Paisley & Renfrewshire, N	Andy Doyle	202	0.4
Rutherglen & Hamilton, W	Yvonne Maclean	336	0.6
Sheffield, SE	Jen Battersby	207	0.5
Stoke-on-Trent, Central	Ali Majid	244	0.8
Streatham	Artificial Beast	192	0.4
Thurrock	Jamie Barnes	244	0.5
Upper Bann	Martin Kelly	460	1.0
Vale of Glamorgan	Steve Reed	238	0.5
Vauxhall	Louis Jensen	164	0.3
Wakefield	Elliot Barr	283	0.7
West Tyrone	Barry Brown	528	1.4
Woking	Declan Wade	229	0.4

Source: BBC News Election 2015

=== London mayoral election, 5 May 2016 ===
Lee Harris stood for CISTA in the 2016 London Mayoral election. He finished ninth out of twelve candidates, obtaining 20,537 first-round votes (0.8%).

=== Northern Ireland Assembly election, 5 May 2016 ===
The party contested four of the 18 constituencies, with its largest share of the vote in any election that the party had contested coming in Newry and Armagh with 2.2% (1,032 first-preference votes).

Constituency	Candidate	First-preference votes	%
Foyle	John Lindsay	259	0.7
Newry and Armagh	Emmet Crossan	1,032	2.2
Upper Bann	Martin Kelly	672	1.5
West Tyrone	Barry Brown	547	1.4

== Citizens Independent Social Thought Alliance ==
Following the de-registering of Cannabis is Safer than Alcohol in November 2016, a new party bearing the same initials, Citizens Independent Social Thought Alliance, was registered with the Electoral Commission in February 2017, one week before the close of nominations for the snap elections to the Northern Ireland Assembly. The leader of this new party is Barry Brown, who was a CISTA candidate in 2016 and 2017.

=== Electoral performance ===
==== Northern Ireland Assembly election, 2 March 2017 ====
The party contested three of the 18 constituencies, with its largest share of the vote coming in Newry and Armagh with 704 first-preference votes (1.3%).

Constituency	Candidate	First-preference votes	%
Foyle	John Lindsay	196	0.4
Newry and Armagh	Emmet Crossan	704	1.3
West Tyrone	Barry Brown	373	0.8

==== 2017 United Kingdom general election ====
Constituency	Candidate	Votes	%	Position
West Tyrone	Barry Brown	393	0.9	7

== See also ==
- Cannabis classification in the United Kingdom
- Cannabis in the United Kingdom
- Cannabis Law Reform
- Cannabis political parties
- Drug policy reform
- List of British politicians who have acknowledged cannabis use
- List of political parties in the United Kingdom
