= St Mary's Church, Bampton =

- Church of Saint Mary the Virgin
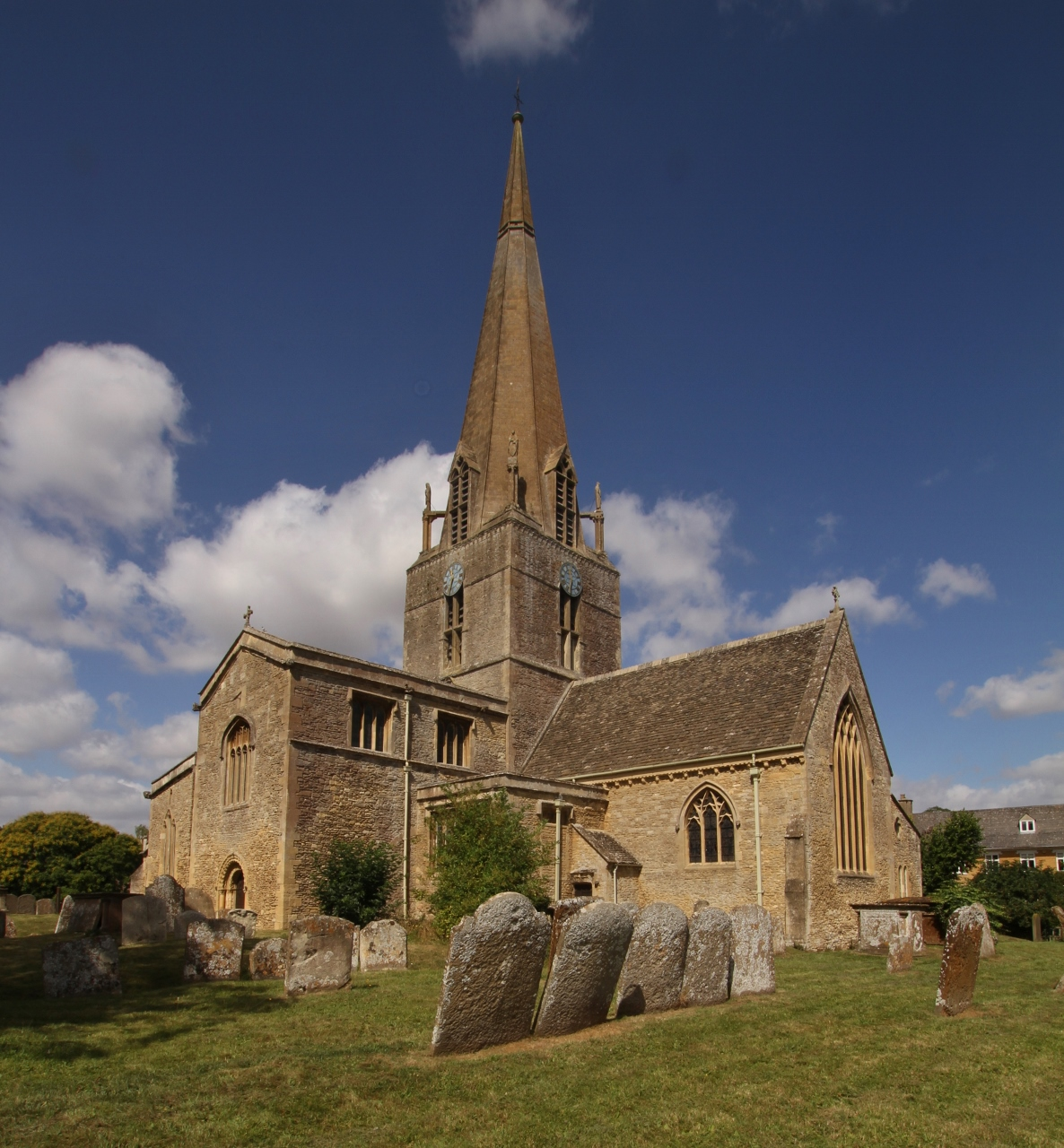
- View from the southeast

- Location within Oxfordshire
- 51°43′40″N 1°32′56″W
- OS grid reference: SP 31262 03325
- Location: Bampton, Oxfordshire
- Country: England
- Denomination: Church of England
- Website: www.bamptonwithclanfield.org

History
- Status: Active
- Founded: 10th or 11th century
- Dedication: Saint Mary the Virgin
- Consecrated: 1062

Architecture
- Functional status: Parish church
- Heritage designation: Grade I listed
- Designated: 12 September 1955
- Architect(s): Ewan Christian (restoration, 1868–70)
- Architectural type: cruciform
- Style: Anglo-Saxon, Norman, Gothic, Gothic Revival
- Years built: 10th–16th centuries

Specifications
- Materials: Cotswold stone, Stonesfield slate (nave and chancel roofs), lead (other roofs)

Administration
- Province: Canterbury
- Diocese: Oxford
- Archdeaconry: Dorchester
- Deanery: Witney
- Parish: Bampton with Clanfield

Clergy
- Bishop: Right Revd Gavin Collins
- Vicar: Revd Janice Collier

The Church of Saint Mary the Virgin is the Church of England parish church of Bampton, West Oxfordshire. It is in the Archdeaconry of Dorchester in the Diocese of Oxford.

The church was built in the 10th or 11th century as an Anglo-Saxon minster with a tower. In the 12th century it was rebuilt as a cruciform Norman building centred on a crossing under the tower. Gothic additions to the church were made several times in the 13th, 14th and 15th centuries.

The church is a Grade I listed building.

== Parish ==
The ancient parish was one of the largest in Oxfordshire, and included the townships of Weald, Lew, Aston, Cote, Shifford, Chimney and Lower Haddon. In 1857 the parish was split into the three ecclesiastical parishes of Bampton Proper, Bampton Lew and Bampton Aston, all now part of the united benefice of Bampton with Clanfield. In 1866 the parish was split into five civil parishes: Bampton, Lew, Aston and Cote, Shifford and Chimney.

== Anglo-Saxon minster ==
Saint Beornwald of Bampton was venerated as patron saint of Bampton from at least the 9th century until the English Reformation. (Note: Evidence of Beornwald's veneration includes a 1516 will of one William Wode, a priest of Bampton) His feast day was 21 December. Very little is known about Beornwald. Although early records (Note: Beornwald is known only from Winchester litanies of the 11th century and Martyrologies of the 12th century (Exeter) and 15th (Syon Abbey).) call him saint, confessor, priest and martyr, even his tomb is now lost. His shrine may have been in the north transept of the parish church, where some evidence of a former shrine remains.

Bampton Classical Opera gives a concert in the church to celebrate St Beornwald's Day on or close to every 21 December.

The Anglo-Saxon church was an important minster serving a large area. The most recognisable traces of that original building are characteristic herringbone masonry in the central crossing tower and stair turret.

== Norman church ==
After the Norman Conquest of England, William the Conqueror granted the church to Leofric, Bishop of Exeter. The Dean and Chapter of Exeter Cathedral have held the advowson of the parish ever since.

In the 12th century the church was rebuilt on a cruciform plan with north and south transepts. Surviving features from this period include the chancel arch under the tower, a Norman arched doorway in the south wall of the south transept, and a few Norman windows, including in the west walls of both transepts.

== Gothic enlargements ==
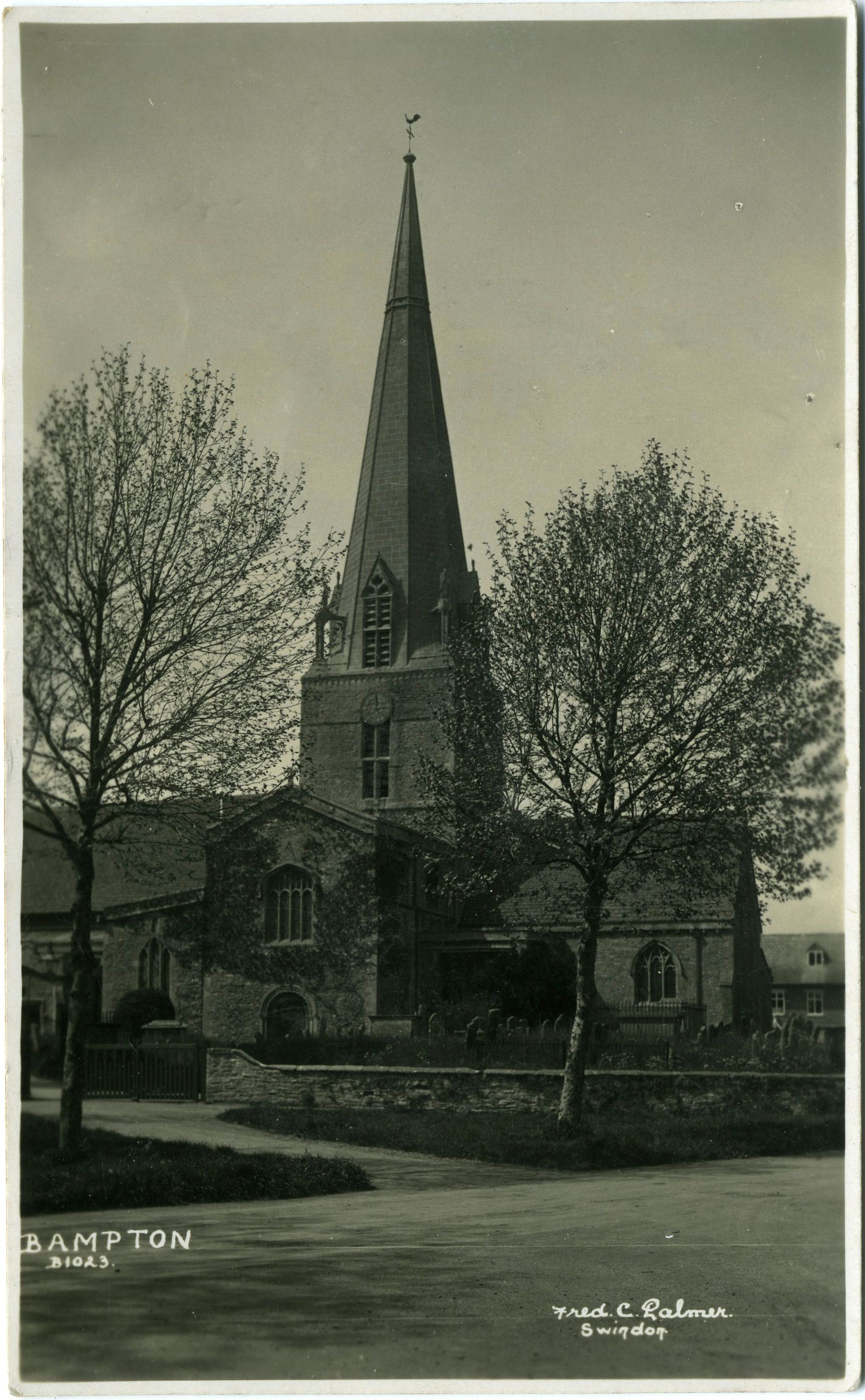
Postcard of St Mary's, photographed by Fred Palmer in 1931

Late in the 13th century the nave was widened by the addition of north and south aisles with four-bay Gothic arcades. Other features from this period include triple sedilia in the chancel, a south chapel adjoining the west side of the south transept and a doorway in the north transept.

Early in the 14th century a carved stone reredos was installed in the chancel. It represents Jesus Christ and his 12 apostles, each in a crocketed niche. The west doorway and five-light west window of the nave are also from this period, as is the base of the baptismal font.

Late in the 14th century a chapel was added on the north side of the chancel, with an arch from the north transept.

In the 15th century clerestories were added to the nave and both transepts, the aisles were re-roofed, an Easter Sepulchre was inserted in the chancel, the embattled south porch was built and parapets and gargoyles were added.

== Post-Mediaeval architecture ==
In the corner between the chancel and south transept is a memorial chapel for the Horde family. It contains 17th-century monuments and was remodelled in 1702.

In 1868–70 the church was restored under the direction of the architect Ewan Christian. The nave and chancel were re-roofed, Gothic Revival windows were inserted in the north wall of the north transept and south wall of the chancel, and the chancel east window was restored.

== Burials and monuments ==
In the south transept is a mediaeval recumbent effigy of a lady. In the north chapel is a stone effigy of a knight, said to be Sir Gilbert Talbot, who died in 1419. On a wall in the south transept is a monument to George Thompson, who died in 1603: a recumbent effigy of him flanked by Corinthian columns.

In the chancel are three monumental brasses: to Thomas Plymmyswode who died about 1419, Robert Holcot who died in 1500 and Frances Gardner who died in 1633.

== Bells, clock and chimes ==
The crossing tower has a ring of eight bells. Roger I Purdue of Bristol cast the fifth, sixth and tenor bells in 1629. Mears and Stainbank of the Whitechapel Bell Foundry cast or re-cast the treble, second, third, fourth and seventh bells in 1906. St Mary's has also a Sanctus bell that James Keene of Woodstock cast in 1626. The bells were restored and re-hung in 2006.

In 1733 St Mary's Vestry paid £34 to John Reynolds, a blacksmith from Hagbourne, to make a new clock for the tower with a chime to ring the eight bells mechanically. The chime rang a tune on the bells at 9am, 1pm, 5pm and 9pm.

The clock has since been replaced with one made by John Smith and Sons of Derby. The chime was long in disrepair and out of use, but after the bells were re-hung a new computer-controlled one was installed that rings a tune on the bells at 1pm and 5pm.

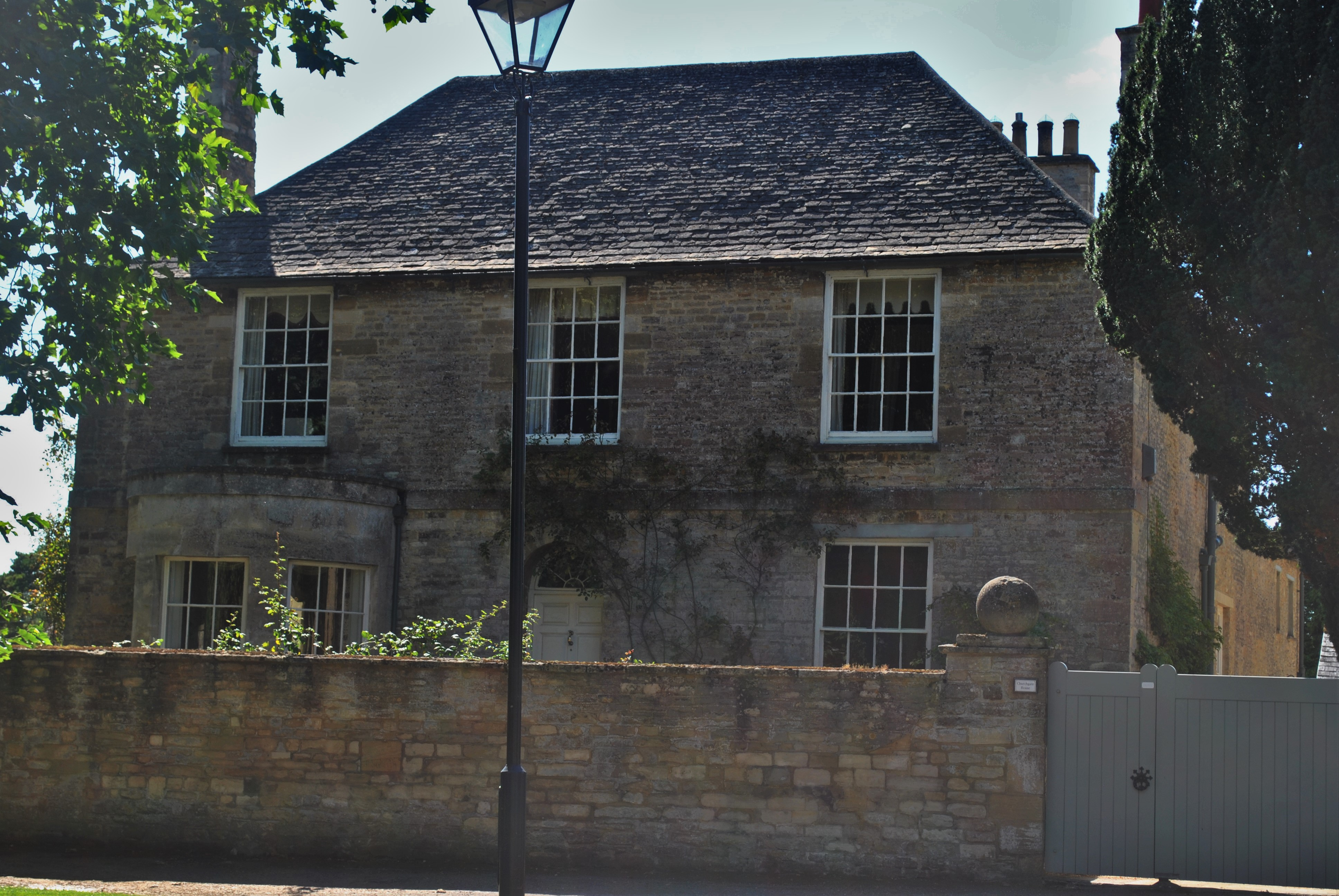
Churchgate House, the former Rectory

== Rectory ==
South of St Mary's is Churchgate House, which used to be the Rectory. The oldest part of the house is 16th-century, with a datestone inscribed "1546 Vicar Joan Dotin". In 1799 a new Georgian main block was added to the front of the building by the builder and architect Daniel Harris.

== In popular culture ==
St Mary's is used as the set of St Michael and All Angels' Church in the television series Downton Abbey. Churchgate House is additionally used as the set of Crawley House, the residence of Isobel and Matthew Crawley.

== Bibliography ==
- Beeson, CFC (1989) [1962]. Simcock, AV (ed.). Clockmaking in Oxfordshire 1400–1850 (3rd ed.). Oxford: Museum of the History of Science. p. 29. ISBN 0-903364-06-9.
- Blair, John (1984). "Saint Beornwald of Bampton" (PDF). Oxoniensia. XLIX. Oxford: Oxfordshire Architectural and Historical Society: 47–54.
- Crossley, Alan; Currie, CRJ (eds.); Baggs, AP; Chance, Eleanor; Colvin, Christina; Day, CJ; Selwyn, Nesta; Townley, Simon C (1996). "Bampton and Weald: Churches". A History of the County of Oxford. Victoria County History. Vol. 13: Bampton Hundred (Part One). London: Oxford University Press for the Institute of Historical Research. pp. 6–8, 48–57. ISBN 978-0-19722-790-9.
- Farmer, David (2011). "Beornwald (Berenwald, Byrnwold) of Bampton". Oxford Dictionary of Saints (Fifth ed.). London: Oxford University Press. p. 46. ISBN 978-0199596607.
- Sherwood, Jennifer; Pevsner, Nikolaus (1974). Oxfordshire. The Buildings of England. Harmondsworth: Penguin Books. pp. 429–431, 432. ISBN 0-14-071045-0.
