= Crawley, Oxfordshire =

Village in Oxfordshire, England

Coordinates: 51.806°N 1.507°W

Crawley
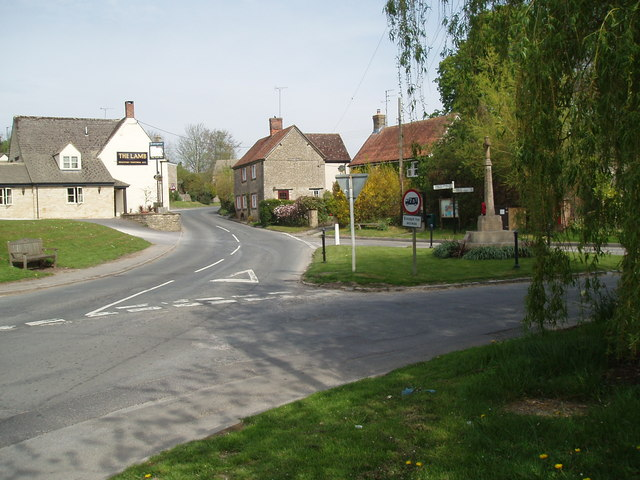
- The centre of Crawley, showing the Lamb Inn (left) and war memorial (right)

- Location within Oxfordshire
- Population: 155 (2011 Census)
- OS grid reference: SP3412
- Civil parish: Crawley
- District: West Oxfordshire
- Shire county: Oxfordshire
- Region: South East
- Country: England
- Sovereign state: United Kingdom
- Post town: Witney
- Postcode district: OX29
- Dialling code: 01993
- Police: Thames Valley
- Fire: Oxfordshire
- Ambulance: South Central
- UK Parliament: Witney
- Website: Crawley Village

Crawley is a village and civil parish beside the River Windrush about 2 1/2 miles (4 km) north of Witney, Oxfordshire. The parish extends from the Windrush in the south almost to village of Leafield in the northwest. The 2011 Census recorded the parish's population as 155.

== Archaeology ==
There is a pair of Bronze Age bowl barrows just south of Blindwell Wood, about 1 3/4 miles (2.8 km) north of the village. They may date from 2400 to 1500 BC. They are a scheduled monument. The course of Akeman Street, a major Roman road, passes through the parish about 1 1/4 miles (2 km) north of the village. In 1964 a 13th-century medieval iron arrowhead was found in the Windrush at Crawley.

== History ==
Uphill Farmhouse was built in the 17th century. Crawley's chapel of Saint Peter was built in 1837 as a chapel of ease for the Church of England parish church at Hailey, Oxfordshire. It has ceased to be used for worship and has been converted into a private house. Crawley village is above a sharp bend on the Windrush. The present road bridge across the river is probably late 18th-century. Crawley Mill on the Windrush was part of the Witney area's former blanket-making industry. It has a mill stream and was originally water-powered but was later converted to steam power. It is now an industrial estate.

== Amenities ==
Crawley has two public houses: the 17th-century Lamb Inn and the Crawley Inn.

== Sources & further reading ==
- Sherwood, Jennifer; Pevsner, Nikolaus (1974). Oxfordshire. The Buildings of England. Harmondsworth: Penguin Books. p. 559. ISBN 0-14-071045-0.
- Townley, Simon C. (ed.); Baggs, A.P.; Chance, Eleanor; Colvin, Christina; Cooper, Janet; Day, C.J.; Selwyn, Nesta; Williamson, Elizabeth; Yates, Margaret (2004). A History of the County of Oxford. Victoria County History. Vol. 14: Witney and its Townships: Bampton Hundred (Part Two). Woodbridge: Boydell & Brewer for the Institute of Historical Research. pp. 171–190. ISBN 978-1-90435-625-7.
- Wadge, Richard (2008). "Medieval Arrowheads from Oxfordshire" (PDF). Oxoniensia. LXXIII. Oxfordshire Architectural and Historical Society: 1–18.
