= Aston, Cote, Shifford and Chimney =

Coordinates: 51.721°N 1.484°W

- Civil parish
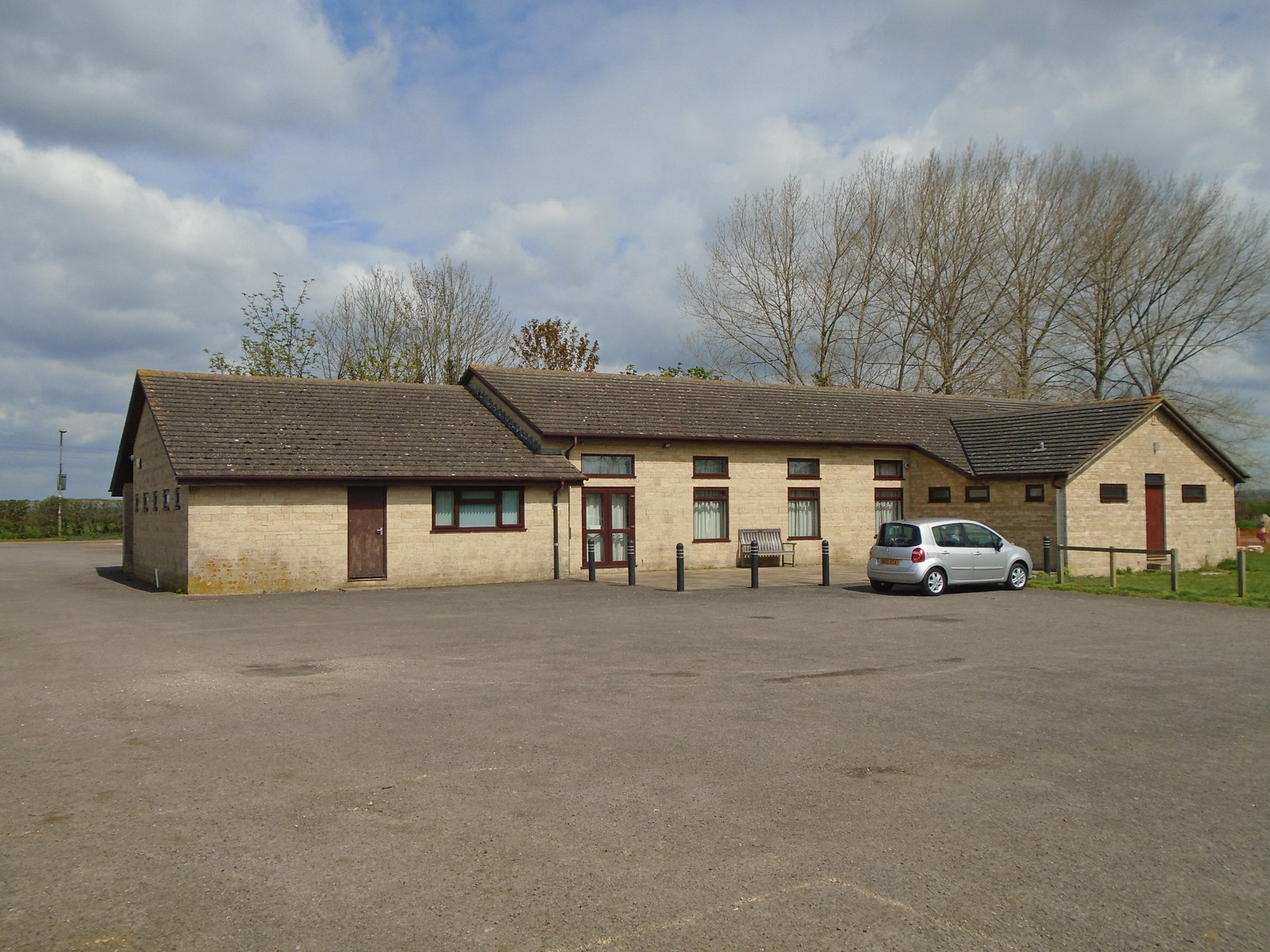
- Aston and Cote Village Hall

- Location within Oxfordshire
- Population: 1,394 (Parish, 2021)
- Civil parish: Aston, Cote, Shifford and Chimney
- District: West Oxfordshire
- Shire county: Oxfordshire
- Region: South East
- Country: England
- Sovereign state: United Kingdom
- Post town: Bampton
- Postcode district: OX18
- Dialling code: 01993
- Police: Thames Valley
- Fire: Oxfordshire
- Ambulance: South Central
- UK Parliament: Witney

Aston, Cote, Shifford and Chimney is a civil parish in the West Oxfordshire district of Oxfordshire, England. As the name suggests, the parish includes the villages of Aston and Cote, and the hamlets of Shifford and Chimney. The southern border of the parish is the River Thames. At the 2021 census the parish had a population of 1,394.

== History ==
Until the 19th century all four places were hamlets in the ancient parish of Bampton.

From the 17th century onwards, parishes were given various civil functions under the poor laws in addition to their original ecclesiastical functions. In some cases, including Bampton, parish functions under the poor laws were exercised by subdivisions of the parish rather than the parish as a whole. Aston and Cote jointly administered poor law functions, whilst Shifford and Chimney each administered the poor laws on their own. As such, "Aston and Cote", Shifford, and Chimney became three civil parishes in 1866 when the legal definition of 'parish' was changed to be the areas used for administering the poor laws. In 1932, Aston and Cote was merged with Chimney to become a new civil parish called Aston Bampton, which was in turn merged with Shifford in 1954 to become Aston Bampton and Shifford. The parish was renamed Aston, Cote, Shifford and Chimney in 1988.

== Governance ==
There are three tiers of local government covering Aston, Cote, Shifford and Chimney, at parish, district and county level: Aston, Cote, Shifford and Chimney Parish Council, West Oxfordshire District Council, and Oxfordshire County Council. The parish council meets at Aston and Cote Village Hall on Cote Road in Aston.

== Locations ==
- Aston grid reference SP340030
- Cote SP352029
- Chimney SP358009
- Shifford SP374020
