= Curbridge, Oxfordshire =

Village in Oxfordshire, England

Coordinates: 51.778°N 1.523°W

Curbridge
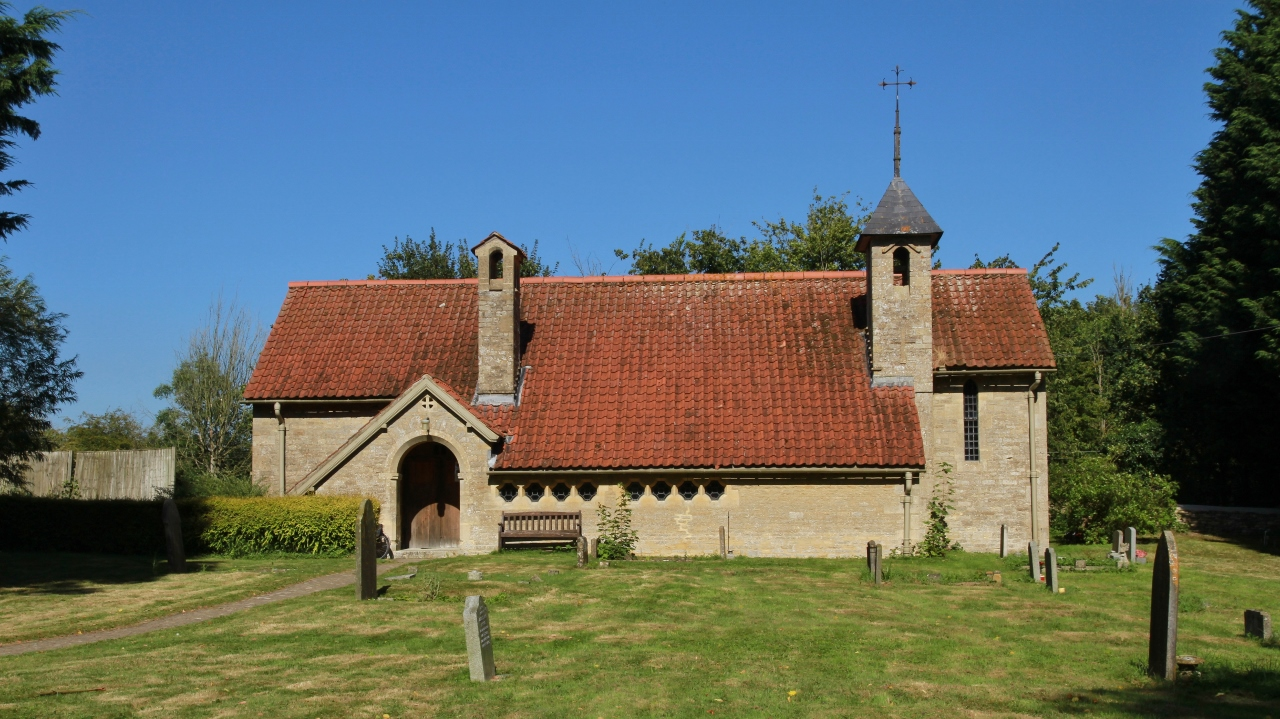
- St John the Baptist parish church

- Location within Oxfordshire
- Population: 763 (Parish, 2021)
- OS grid reference: SP3308
- Civil parish: Curbridge
- District: West Oxfordshire
- Shire county: Oxfordshire
- Region: South East
- Country: England
- Sovereign state: United Kingdom
- Post town: Witney
- Postcode district: OX29
- Dialling code: 01993
- Police: Thames Valley
- Fire: Oxfordshire
- Ambulance: South Central
- UK Parliament: Witney
- Website: Curbridge Village Website

Curbridge is a village and civil parish in the West Oxfordshire of Oxfordshire, England. It lies immediately south-west of Witney. At the 2021 census the parish had a population of 763. It shares a grouped parish council with the neighbouring parish of Lew.

== Romano-British settlement ==
When the Witney Bypass was being built in the 1970s, the remains of a Romano-British settlement were found a short distance northeast of Manor Farm. Foundations were found of rectangular timber-framed buildings, some with limestone rubble foundations. A cemetery was found, containing 18 burials. There may have been more, but if so they are now beneath the bypass. Most of the bodies lay with their heads pointing east or north. Three of the adults had been beheaded, and were laid with their heads between their legs. This was a burial practice in the late Roman and early Anglo-Saxon eras. It is not known whether beheading was the cause of death or was done posthumously.

In a later phase of settlement, a midden covered the cemetery. Artefacts found included a whetstone made from local limestone, a copper alloy brooch, a copper finger ring, a bronze Roman coin from the reign of the Roman usurper Magnentius (AD 350–353), fragments of Romano-British pottery, and clusters of hobnails showing where leather footwear had rotted away in the ground.

== History ==
Caswell Farm, 3/4 mile (1.2 km) southwest of the village, is a moated farmstead that includes remnants of a 15th-century house. It is a Grade II* listed building. In the mid-1970s the Witney Bypass was built to allow the A40 trunk road to pass south of Witney. It was built through Curbridge parish only 100–200 yards (91–183 m) north of the village. The bypass was made the new civil parish boundary, and that part of the parish north of it was transferred to Witney.

== Parish church ==
A Church of England chapel was built in Curbridge in 1838 and the Gothic Revival architect CC Rolfe added an apse in 1874. In 1906 the chapel was demolished and replaced with the present Church of England parish church of Saint John the Baptist. Its parish is part of the Benefice of Witney, which also includes Hailey.

== Governance ==
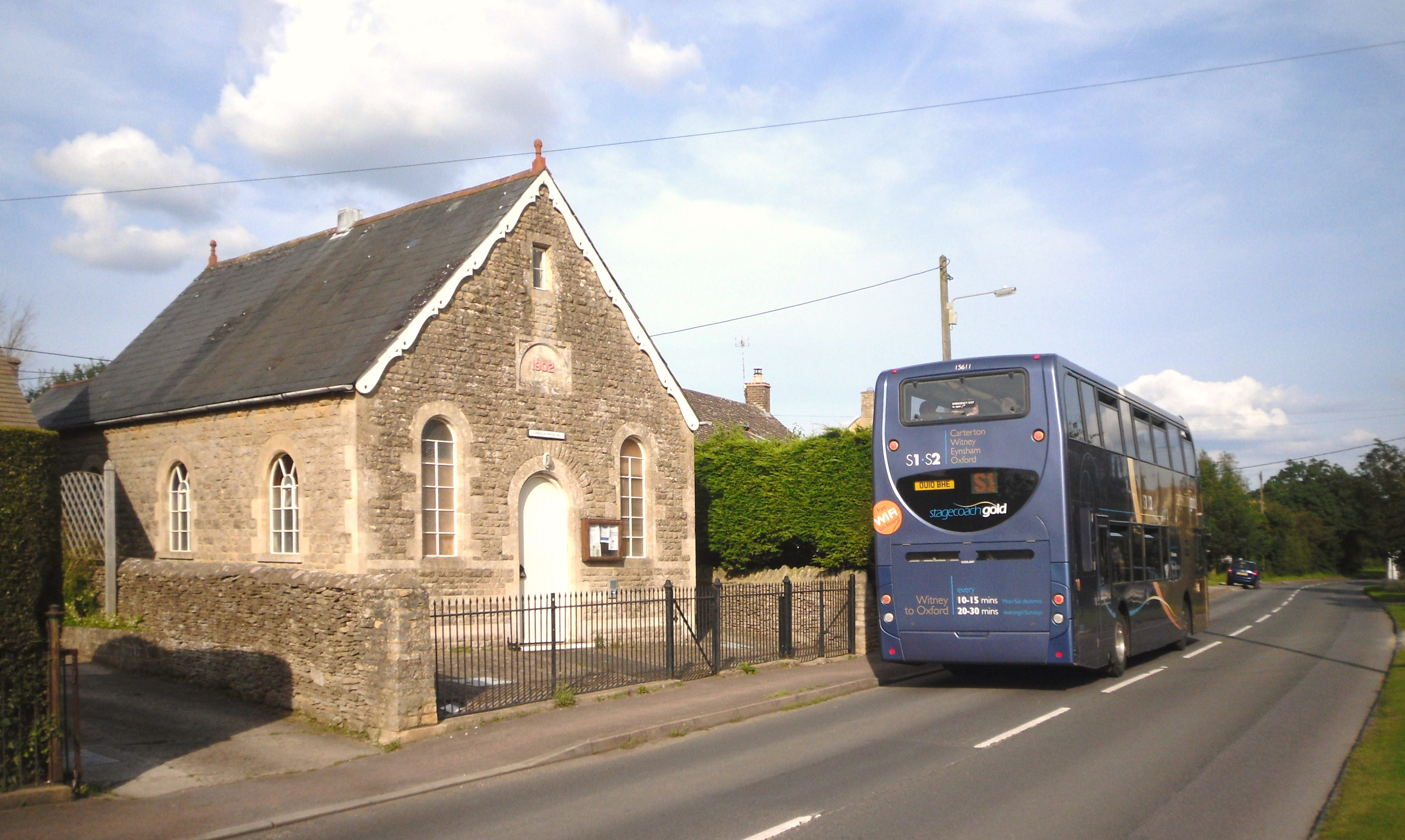
Curbridge Parish Hall

There are three tiers of local government covering Curbridge, at parish, district and county level: Curbridge and Lew Parish Council, West Oxfordshire District Council, and Oxfordshire County Council. The parish council is a grouped parish council, also covering the neighbouring parish of Lew. The parish council meets at Curbridge Parish Hall on Main Road, which was formerly a Methodist church, built in 1902.

== Sources and further reading ==
- Chambers, R.A.; Harman, Mary; Wilson, Bob (1976). "A Romano-British Settlement at Curbridge" (PDF). Oxoniensia. XLI. Oxfordshire Architectural and Historical Society: 38–56.
- Saint, Andrew (1970). "Three Oxford Architects" (PDF). Oxoniensia. XXXV. Oxford Architectural and Historical Society: 53–102.
- Sherwood, Jennifer; Pevsner, Nikolaus (1974). Oxfordshire. The Buildings of England. Harmondsworth: Penguin Books. p. 567. ISBN 0-14-071045-0.
- Townley, Simon C. (ed.); Baggs, A.P.; Chance, Eleanor; Colvin, Christina; Cooper, Janet; Day, C.J.; Selwyn, Nesta; Williamson, Elizabeth; Yates, Margaret (2004). A History of the County of Oxford. Victoria County History. Vol. 14: Witney and its Townships: Bampton Hundred (Part Two). Woodbridge: Boydell & Brewer for the Institute of Historical Research. pp. 190–225. ISBN 978-1-90435-625-7.
