= Clanfield =

Clanfield may refer to:

- Clanfield, Hampshire
- Clanfield, Oxfordshire
