= Stimson Scorcher =

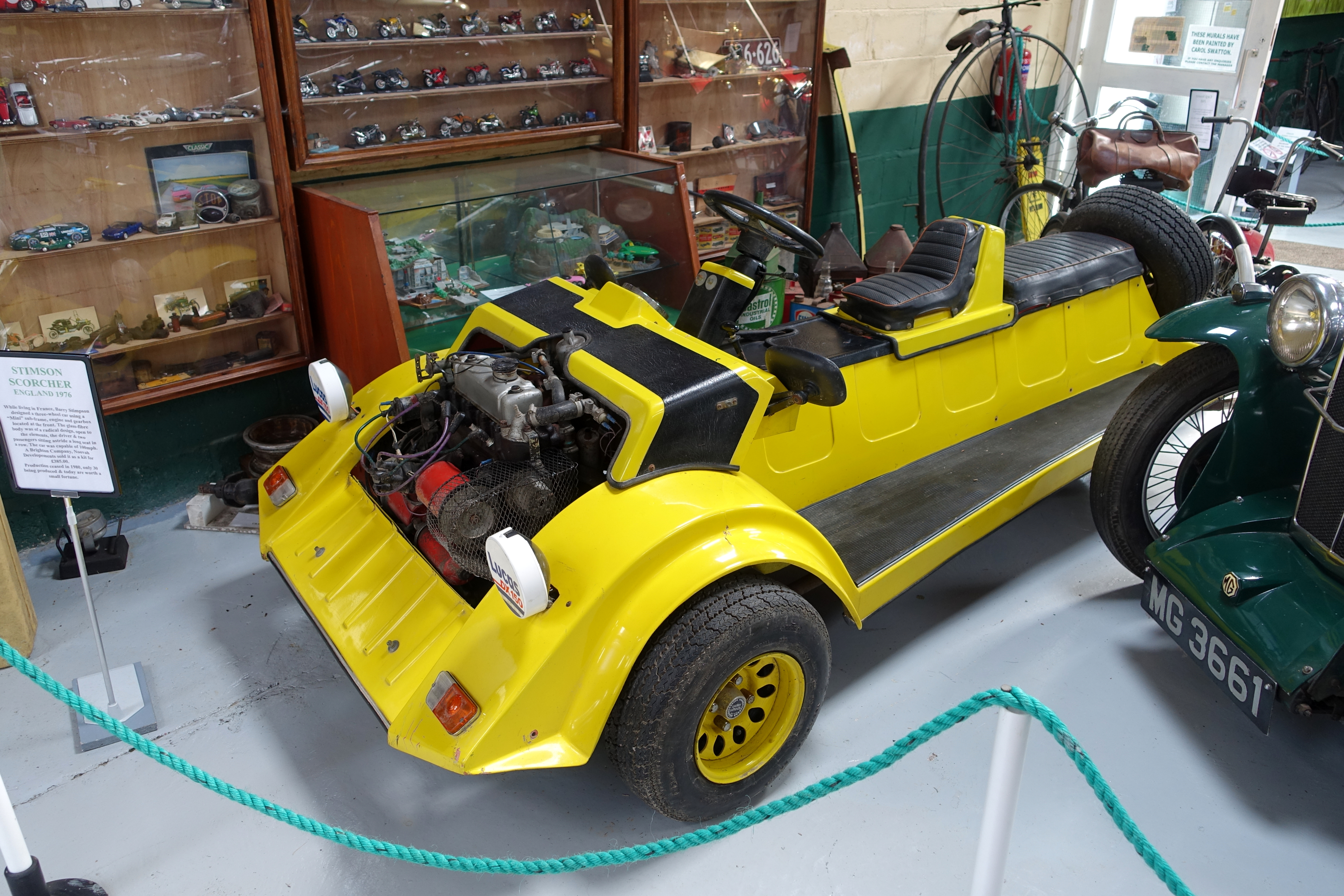
- 1976 Stimson Scorcher

Overview
- Production: 1976–80
- Designer: Barry Stimson

Body and chassis
- Layout: 2 front wheels, 1 rear wheel Front-wheel drive

Powertrain
- Engine: Four-cylinder 848–1275 cc

The Stimson Scorcher is a three-wheeled vehicle designed by Barry Stimson and first produced in the UK in 1976. The Scorcher was available preassembled or as a kit, sold by Noovoh Developments of Brighton for £385 (equivalent to £2100 in 2023 (Note: UK Retail Price Index inflation figures are based on data from Clark, Gregory (2017), "The Annual RPI and Average Earnings for Britain, 1209 to Present (New Series)", MeasuringWorth)).

During its four-year production run, ending in 1980, 30 Scorchers were produced. There was an unsuccessful attempt to resuscitate the Scorcher project the following year.

The Austin Mini 848 cc (51.7 cu in) engine, one of those used to power the Scorcher, is able to deliver a top speed of 100 mph (160 km/h).

== Construction ==
The glassfibre body is mounted on a steel tubular-frame chassis and is completely open to the elements, offering the vehicle's occupants no protection from the weather. Even the engine is exposed, unless the buyer purchased the optional plastic bonnet.

The Scorcher has two wheels at the front and conventional car controls. Its unusual configuration of three seats with the driver and passengers sitting in line astride the machine meant that the UK's licensing authority classified it as a motorcycle and sidecar combination, which had the consequence that one of the passengers was not required to wear a crash helmet.

== Engine and transmission ==
The Scorcher is powered by an Austin Mini engine and gearbox of between 848 cc (51.7 cu in) and 1275 cc (77.8 cu in), mounted on a Mini sub frame at the front of the vehicle. The car's weight of only 560 pounds (250 kg) allowed the 848 cc engine to deliver a top speed of 100 mph (160 km/h).

== Later developments ==
Scorcher production ended in 1980, but in 1981 the project was bought by Gerald Pickford of Clanfield. Pickford made some design changes to the lower front end, but by the end of 1982 only three of the new Scorchers had been produced.

== Appraisal ==
In a 2003 interview published in The Daily Telegraph, Stimson observed of the Scorcher that "It's the worst seller of all my cars, but the most famous – I find that weird". Motoring journalist and author Steve Hole has described the Scorcher as "one of the most bonkers kit cars ever made".
