= Clapton Crabb Rolfe =

English Gothic Revival architect

- Born: 5 March 1845; Hailey, Oxfordshire, England
- Died: 18 December 1907 (aged 62); Wheatley, Oxfordshire
- Occupation: Architect
- Buildings: St John the Evangelist parish church, Hailey, Oxfordshire; All Saints' parish church, Nuneham Courtenay, Oxfordshire
- Projects: King Edward VI Grammar School, Nuneaton

Clapton Crabb Rolfe (5 March 1845 – 18 December 1907) was an English Gothic Revival architect whose practice was based in Oxford.

== Family ==
Rolfe was the second of nine children. His father was Rev. George Crabb Rolfe (1811–93) who was perpetual curate of Hailey, Oxfordshire from 1838 until his death. His mother Ellen was a sister of the architect William Wilkinson. Rolfe's elder brother George Wilkinson Rolfe (1843–1912) followed their father into the clergy and a younger brother, William Andrew Rolfe (born 1850), also became an architect. In 1873 Rolfe married Annie de Pré. They had one son, Benedict Hugh Rolfe (born 1874) who trained as an architect and assisted his father on some of his later works, before settling in London as a consulting engineer.

Rolfe died in 1907. Both he and Annie are buried in the parish churchyard of St Mary's, Wheatley, Oxfordshire.

The Buildings of England series of architectural guides spells Rolfe's middle name "Crabbe" but other authorities use "Crabb", A memorial plaque in Hailey parish church to his father Rev. G.C. Rolfe also uses the latter spelling.

== Career ==
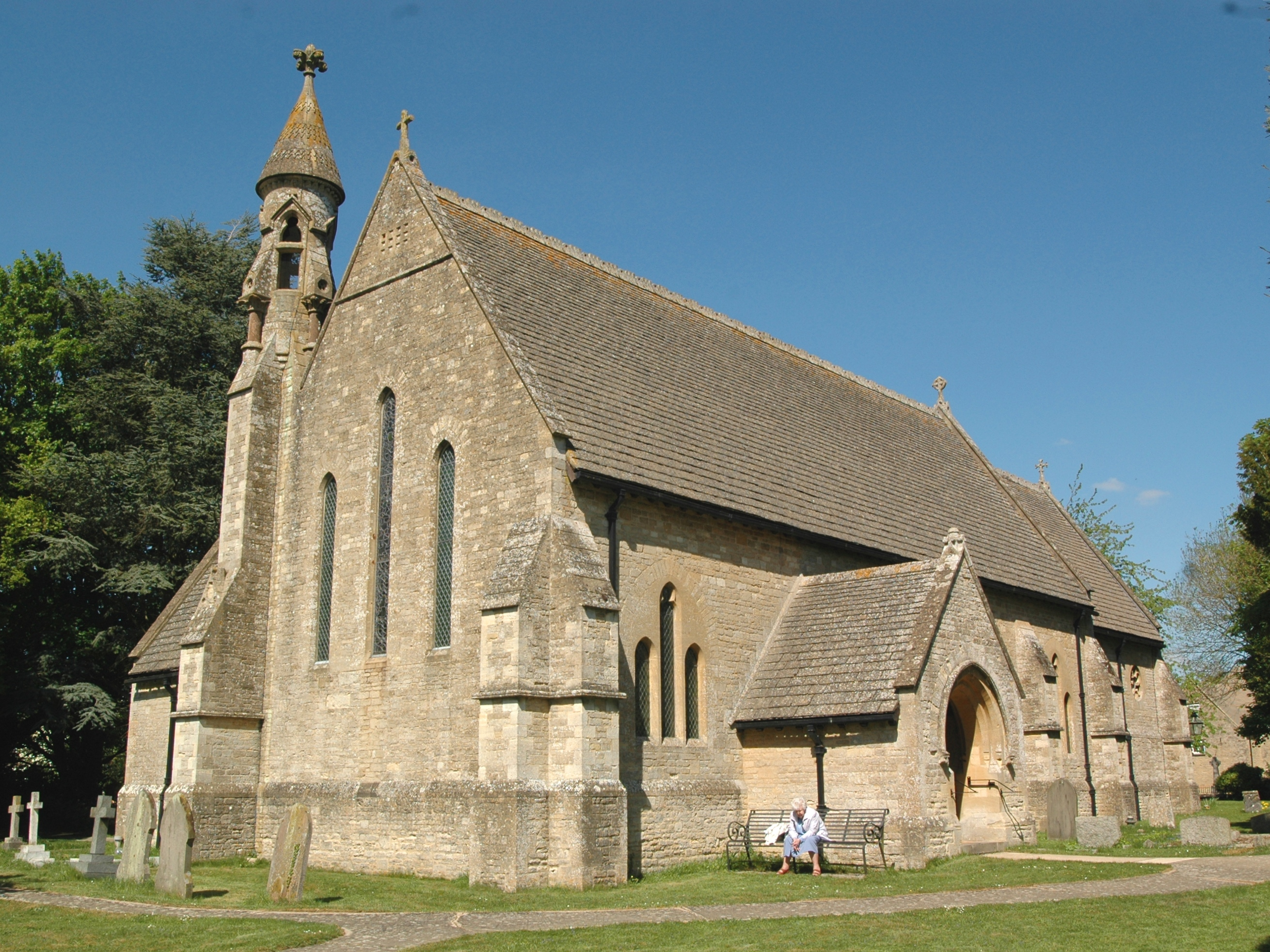
St John the Evangelist parish church, Hailey, Oxfordshire, built 1868–69

Much of Rolfe's work was for parish churches and other institutions of the Church of England. His first major commission was to design a new parish church at Hailey for his father. His design was in a freely reinterpreted French Gothic style. The Oxford Diocesan Architect G.E. Street condemned Rolfe's first draft as "needlessly eccentric". Despite Street's objections Rolfe completed the church with some unusual details, including an unusually shaped bell-turret.

Rolfe's work is notable for its quality and detail. In his reconstruction of part of the nave of Nuneaton Abbey and his restoration of All Saints parish church, Thorpe Malsor, the carving was undertaken by Harry Hems (1842–1916), a craftsman who originated from Yorkshire but from 1866 worked in Exeter. He carved for Rolfe again on the restorations of St Giles' parish church, Standlake in 1880–91, St Martin's parish church, Chipping Ongar in 1884, and St Michael's parish church, Inkpen in 1896–97, and also at Rolfe's new chapel for the Sisterhood of Saint Thomas, Oxford in 1888.

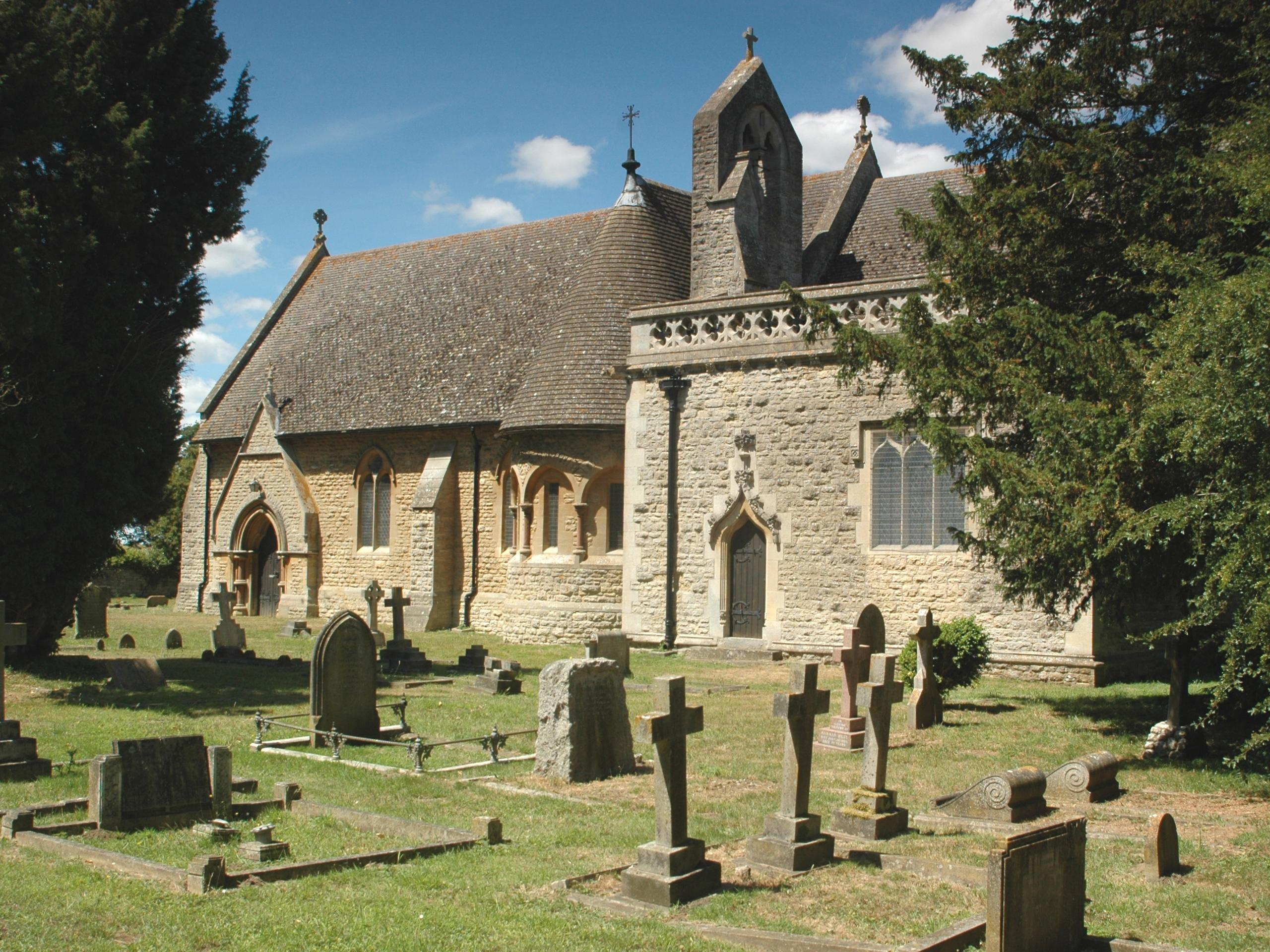
All Saints' parish church, Nuneham Courtenay, Oxfordshire, built 1872–74. The apsidal south transept is the organ chamber

Rolfe became an Associate of the Royal Institute of British Architects in 1869. In 1881, following the death of G.E. Street, Rolfe was one of the applicants to succeed him as Oxford diocesan architect. John Oldrid Scott was the successful applicant, but Rolfe was later appointed Oxford Diocesan Surveyor.

Rolfe was a devout Anglo-Catholic who sought to translate his faith into his building work. In 1871 he wrote in The Builder:

Those professional men nowadays who despise and ridicule that pure symbolic spirit which actuated our forefathers in their church-work, and probably substitute for it that £sd money-grubbing spirit of the age, are alike unfit and unworthy of being engaged on any modern church-work whatever.

Rolfe wrote a number of publications on aspects of church architecture and furnishing, but as he got older the style and content of his writing became increasingly obscure.

== Works ==
=== Buildings ===
- Saint John the Evangelist, Hailey, Oxfordshire: new church, 1868–69
- Old Church, Churchill, Oxfordshire: east window, 1869
- 114–138, 149–156 and 159–164 Kingston Road, Oxford: terraces of artisan houses, 1870–75
- Ascott-under-Wychwood: village school, 1871
- Leafield, Oxfordshire: extension to village school, 1871
- All Saints, Nuneham Courtenay: new church, 1872–74
- Holy Trinity, Rayleigh, Essex: restoration of chancel, 1873
- Saint John the Baptist, Curbridge, Oxfordshire: added apse to chapel, 1874 (demolished 1906)
- Saint James's College, South Leigh: 1875 (later part of Holyrood Hospital)
- Saint Peter, Mancetter, Warwickshire: restoration, 1875
- Nuneaton Abbey, Warwickshire: new vicarage and reconstruction of part of nave, 1877
- All Saints, Thorpe Malsor, Northamptonshire: restoration, 1877
- Saint Margaret, Eglwyscummin, Carmarthenshire: restoration, 1878
- King Edward VI Grammar School, Nuneaton, Warwickshire: new buildings, 1879–80
- Saint Giles, Standlake, Oxfordshire: restored church, 1880–91
- Saint Lawrence, Appleton, Berkshire (now in Oxfordshire): restored nave, 1882–84
- Saint Martin, Chipping Ongar, Essex: south aisle, 1884
- Holy Rood, Shilton, Oxfordshire: restored church, 1884–88
- Sisterhood of Saint Thomas, Oxford: new buildings, 1886 (demolished 1969)
- 29 Abbey Road, Oxford: house, 1886–87
- Saint Denis, Northmoor, Oxfordshire: partial restoration, 1886 or 1887
- Holywell Ford, Mill Lane, Oxford: house, 1888
- Saint Thomas, Oxford: vicarage, 1893
- Barnett House, Turl Street, Oxford: house on corner of Broad Street, 1889 (demolished 1960's)
- Hailey parish school, Oxfordshire: infants' classroom, 1892
- Holy Rood, Cuxham, Oxfordshire: rebuilt chancel, 1895
- Saint Michael, Inkpen, Berkshire: restored and remodelled church, 1896
- Saint Nicholas, Dormston, Worcestershire: restoration, 1899

=== Written works ===
- Chancels, Screens and Roods (pamphlet). Reading: 1877.
- The Ancient Use of Liturgical Colours. Oxford & London: Parker & Co. 1879.
- Ecclesiastical Dilapidations, a Handbook for the Clergy. London: Simpkin, Marshall. 1883.
- The Liturgical Use of Incense, an Eirenicon by C. C. R., with Preface by the Rt Hon. Earl Nelson. London. 1900.

== Sources ==
- North Oxford Victorian Suburb Conservation Area Appraisal Draft. Oxford: Oxford City Council. p. 20.
- Brodie, Antonia; Felstead, Alison; Franklin, Jonathan; Pinfield, Leslie; Oldfield, Jane, eds. (2001). Directory of British Architects 1834–1914, L–Z. London & New York: Continuum. p. 187. ISBN 0-8264-5514-X.
- Crossley, Alan; Currie, C.R.J.; Baggs, A.P.; Chance, Eleanor; Colvin, Christina; Day, C.J.; Selwyn, Nesta; Townley, Simon C. (1996). A History of the County of Oxford, Volume 13: Bampton Hundred (Part One). Victoria County History. pp. 166–170. ISBN 978-0-19-722790-9.
- Pevsner, Nikolaus (1966). Berkshire. The Buildings of England. Harmondsworth: Penguin Books.
- Pevsner, Nikolaus; Wedgwood, Alexandra (1966). Warwickshire. The Buildings of England. Harmondsworth: Penguin Books.
- Rolfe, C.C. (1871). "THE ARCHITECTURAL CONFERENCE". The Builder. 29: 471.
- Saint, Andrew (1970). "Three Oxford Architects". Oxoniensia. XXXV. Oxfordshire Architectural and Historical Society: 53 ff. Archived from the original on 28 September 2007.
- Sherwood, Jennifer; Pevsner, Nikolaus (1974). Oxfordshire. The Buildings of England. Harmondsworth: Penguin Books. ISBN 0-14-071045-0.
- Baggs, A.P.; Chance, Eleanor; Colvin, Christina; Cooper, Janet; Day, C.J.; Selwyn, Nesta; Williamson, Elizabeth; Yates, Margaret (2004). Townley, Simon C. (ed.). A History of the County of Oxford, Volume 14: Bampton Hundred (Part Two). Victoria County History. pp. 254–255. ISBN 978-1-904356-25-7.
- Tyack, Geoffrey (1998). Oxford An Architectural Guide. Oxford & New York: Oxford University Press. p. 237. ISBN 0-19-817423-3.
