= Cote, Oxfordshire =

Hamlet in Oxfordshire, England

Coordinates: 51.721°N 1.490°W

Cote
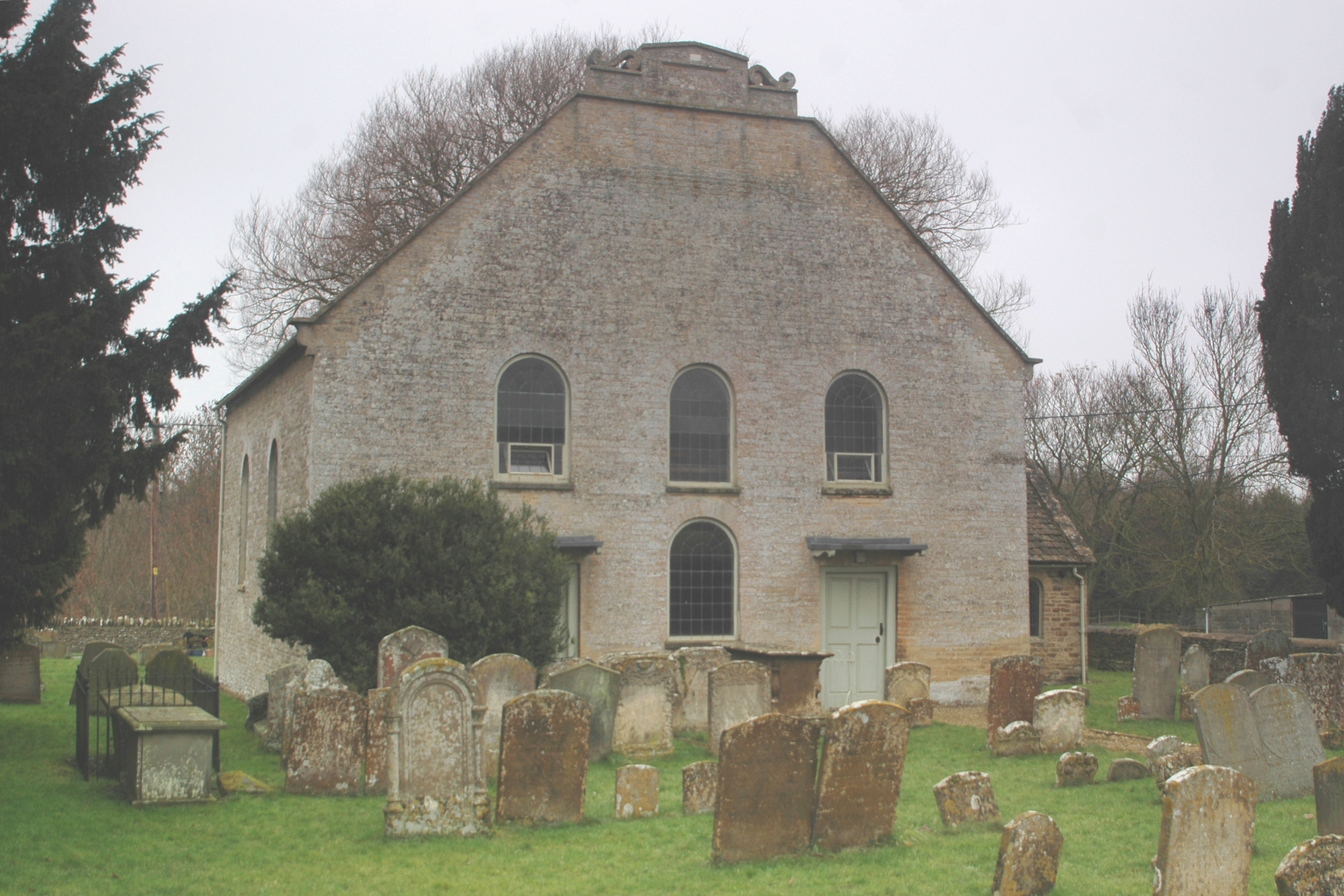
- East front of former Baptist chapel

- Location within Oxfordshire
- OS grid reference: SP3502
- Civil parish: Aston
- District: West Oxfordshire
- Shire county: Oxfordshire
- Region: South East
- Country: England
- Sovereign state: United Kingdom
- Post town: Bampton
- Postcode district: OX18
- Dialling code: 01993
- Police: Thames Valley
- Fire: Oxfordshire
- Ambulance: South Central
- UK Parliament: Witney
- Website: Aston, Cote, Chimney and Shifford

Cote is a hamlet about 4 miles (6.4 km) south of Witney and 1 mile (1.6 km) north of the River Thames in West Oxfordshire, England. Cote is part of the civil parish of Aston, Cote, Shifford and Chimney. The hamlet of Cote stretches along Cote Lane, which seems to have originated as a road to a former crossing of the River Thames at Shifford.

== Archaeology ==
Cropmarks have been found east of Cote Lane that suggest prehistoric occupation. There have been isolated finds of Neolithic and Bronze Age items near the north end of Cote Lane and Iron Age pottery and a brooch have been found south of Cote House. In the 19th century two Roman coins were found at Cote: one each from the reigns of Trajan (reigned AD 98–117) and Hadrian (reigned 117–138). Other cropmarks on river gravel terraces east of Cote suggest Saxon sunken huts.

== Manor ==
In the Anglo-Saxon era Cote was part of the manor of Bampton. The earliest known written record of Cote dates from 1203. Cote may be the site of a messuage and building plot for a manor that Henry III granted to one Imbert Pugeys in 1238. The present Cote House is largely 16th and 17th century but may be on the site of the medieval buildings. The east front of Cote House includes two-light 13th century windows with plate tracery that is not in its original position but may well have been salvaged from the medieval house.

Alan Horde of the Middle Temple bought Cote manor in 1553. The hall range and west wing of Cote House were probably built after 1583 for either Thomas Horde (died circa 1607) or Sir Thomas Horde (died 1662). The west wing and hall still have an early 17th-century staircase and fireplaces and some 17th-century panelling. In 1665 Cote House was assessed at 11 hearths for Hearth Tax. A new main entrance was added to the north front of Cote House in about 1700, presumably for Thomas Horde (died 1715). The principal rooms were refurbished at the same time, including the present panelling of the drawing room. One set of iron gates is dated 1704 and bears the initials of Thomas Horde. Late in the 16th century Thomas Horde was convicted of recusancy and the Crown seized two-thirds of his manor for non-payment of fines. When he died in 1607 his remaining debts were pardoned and the seized part of his manor was restored to his heirs.

== Economic and social history ==
By 1239 Cote and Aston shared a single open field system. Cote Common was often called Cote Moor. In 1497 Mary, Lady Hastings and Botreux, demolished a tenant's house at Cote and enclosed its 20 acres (8.1 ha) landholding as pasture. In the 1660s the Lord of the manor Thomas Horde enclosed about 120 acres (49 ha) close to Cote House and promoted a general enclosure of the manor, but most tenants enclosed no more than 2 acres (0.81 ha) or 3 acres (1.2 ha) each. The open meadows tended to flood and in 1668 new channels were dug to drain them.

Cote Farmhouse and Cote Cottage were built in the 17th or early in the 18th century. Milton Lodge was rebuilt in about 1720 with a symmetrical five-bayed front. East of Cote is a Windmill Field but no windmill has survived. In 1834 tenants of Aston and Cote sought enclosure and initially Caroline Horde supported them. However, most proprietors did not and the proposal was defeated. Parliament finally passed an Enclosure Act for Aston and Cote in 1852 and the land award was completed in 1855. Most landholdings both before and after enclosure were mixed farms. In the 19th century the Gillett family of Cote House Farm were noted Oxford Down sheep breeders. In 1862 Charles Gillett won prizes at the Royal Agricultural Show.

In the middle of the 19th century a new straight road was built northwards from the end of Cote Lane for a distance of just over 1 mile (1.6 km) to where it joined the road between Yelford and Lew. By 1876 Cote Lodge Farm had been built west of the new road and around the same time new farm labourers' cottages were built. Sir Thomas Horde built a malthouse in 1657 but by 1659 it was making a loss. There is another isolated record of a maltster in Cote in 1725. Cote had a public house, the Black Horse, from 1779 to 1801. In the 1840s Cote House Farm produced cider. The hamlet had a beerhouse from 1869 (when Parliament passed the Wine and Beerhouse Act 1869) but it closed after 1939. Other trades in Cote in 1939 included a hurdle-maker and a saddler. In 1893 Cote suffered a diphtheria epidemic that may have been caused by contaminated wells. Cote had a mains gas supply by 1939, mains electricity by 1949 and mains water from about 1967.

== Administrative history ==
Cote was historically a hamlet in the ancient parish of Bampton.

From the 17th century onwards Cote and the neighbouring hamlet of Aston jointly administered parish functions under the poor laws. As such, "Aston and Cote" became a civil parish in 1866 when the legal definition of 'parish' was changed to be the areas used for administering the poor laws. In 1932 the parish of Aston and Cote was merged with the parish of Chimney (another former hamlet of Bampton) to become a new civil parish called Aston Bampton, which was in turn merged with Shifford (also a former hamlet of Bampton) in 1954 to become Aston Bampton and Shifford. The parish was renamed Aston, Cote, Shifford and Chimney in 1988.

== Chapels ==
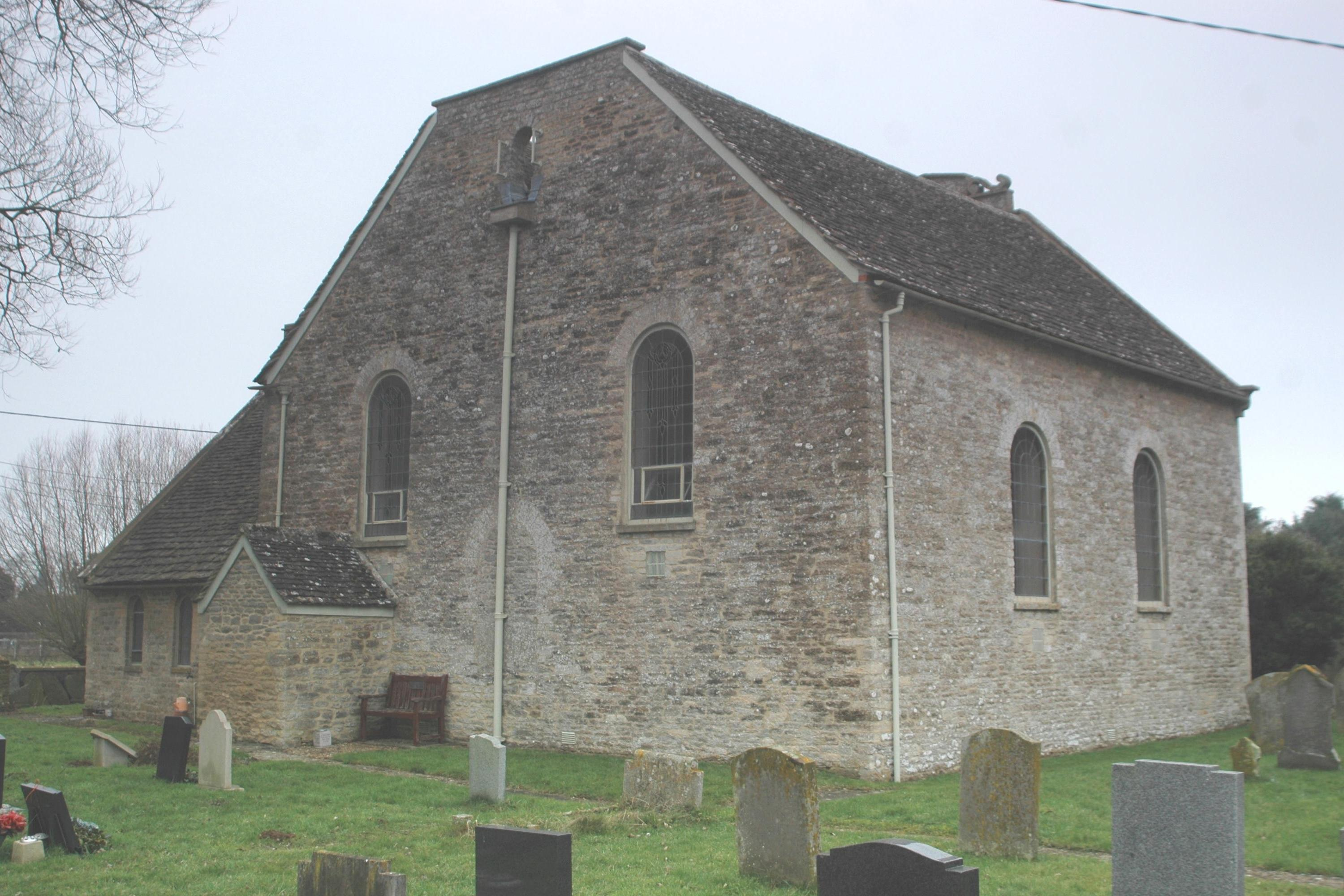
Former Baptist chapel from the south-west

Cote has never had a Church of England parish church. Cote was part of the ecclesiastical parish of Bampton, and Cote residents would have worshipped at the chapel of ease at Shifford until it became derelict some time between 1772 and 1784. Cote appointed a warden for Shifford chapel probably in the 15th century and continued to do so for the rebuilt chapel late in the 19th century. A Baptist congregation was established in Cote in about 1656, initially sharing a minister with the Baptist congregation at Longworth on the opposite side of the Thames. Cote's first Baptist chapel was completed and registered for worship in 1704. It was replaced by the present building in 1756, and chapel membership grew from 85 in 1772 to more than 100. In 1850-51 attendance at Sunday morning worship averaged 200.

Benjamin Arthur, who was pastor from 1856 to 1882, had the chapel interior extensively reordered in 1859. The present single gable on the east front of the chapel was added at the same time, replacing a previous double gable and hiding a central roof valley. During Rev. Arthur's ministry, membership rose to about 195 and congregations regularly numbered around 400. For a number of lengthy periods in the 20th century the Baptist congregation lacked a minister and the deacons managed the chapel. Membership declined to 92 in 1906 and 52 in 1935. It had recovered to 104 by 1971 but fell again to about 85 in 1990. The chapel was still in use for worship in 1992 but is now disused. It is a Grade II* listed building and is now managed and maintained by the Historic Chapels Trust.

== Sources ==
- Crossley, Alan; Currie, C.R.J. (eds.); Baggs, A.P.; Chance, Eleanor; Colvin, Christina; Day, C.J.; Selwyn, Nesta; Townley, Simon C. (1996). A History of the County of Oxford, Volume 13: Bampton Hundred (Part One). Victoria County History. pp. 6–80.
- Sherwood, Jennifer; Pevsner, Nikolaus (1974). Oxfordshire. The Buildings of England. Harmondsworth: Penguin Books. pp. 557–558. ISBN 0-14-071045-0.
