= Bainton =

Bainton as a place may refer to:

- Bainton, Cambridgeshire, England
- Bainton, East Riding of Yorkshire, England
- Bainton, Oxfordshire, England
- Bainton Road, Oxford, England

Bainton as a surname may refer to:

- Edgar Bainton (1880-1956), English composer
- Neil Bainton (born 1970), English cricket umpire
- Roland Bainton (1894-1984), English church historian
