= Clanfield, Oxfordshire =

Village in Oxfordshire, England

Coordinates: 51.716°N 1.598°W

Clanfield
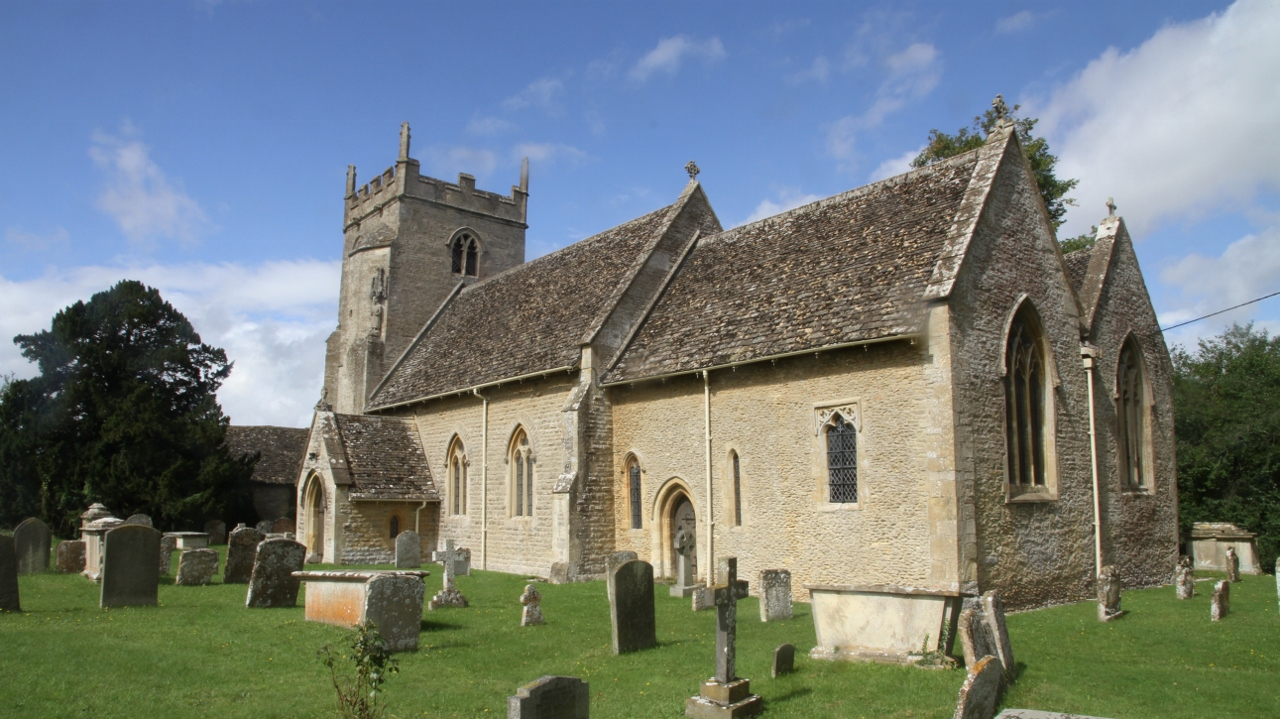
- St Stephen's parish church

- Location within Oxfordshire
- Population: 879 (2011 Census)
- OS grid reference: SP2801
- Civil parish: Clanfield
- District: West Oxfordshire
- Shire county: Oxfordshire
- Region: South East
- Country: England
- Sovereign state: United Kingdom
- Post town: Bampton
- Postcode district: OX18
- Dialling code: 01367
- Police: Thames Valley
- Fire: Oxfordshire
- Ambulance: South Central
- UK Parliament: Witney
- Website: Clanfield Village

Clanfield is a village and civil parish about three miles (5 km) south of Carterton, Oxfordshire. The parish includes the hamlet of Little Clanfield one mile (1.6 km) west of the village, on Little Clanfield Brook which forms the parish's western boundary. The parish's eastern boundary is Black Bourton Brook and its southern boundary is Radcot Cut, an artificial watercourse on the River Thames floodplain. The 2011 Census recorded the parish's population as 879.

== Preceptory ==
Robert D'Oyly gave land at Clanfield to the Order of Knights Hospitaller, who built a moated preceptory on the site. This gift must have predated D'Oyly's fall from power in 1142 during the Anarchy. By 1279 the preceptory owned land and property not only at Clanfield but also at Brize Norton, Grafton, Westwell, Oxford and Woodstock. The preceptory buildings have gone and their moated site is now occupied by Friars Court, a gabled house built in about 1650. Friars Court is a private house but it is now hired out as an approved venue for weddings and civil partnerships.

== Parish church ==
In the Church of England parish church of Saint Stephen the tympanum over the south door is Norman and both the arcade between the nave and the north aisle and the responds of the chancel arch are in the Transitional style between Norman and the Early English Gothic. These features date the church building to about 1200. St Stephen's has four lancet windows dating from late in the 12th century or early in the 13th century: two in the south wall of the chancel and two in the north wall of a chapel on the north side of the chancel. In the chancel the east window and the easternmost window in the south wall are Decorated Gothic, which dates them to between 1250 and 1350. The style of the bell tower suggests it was built either about 1300 or early in the 14th century.

In the 15th century a large statue of St Stephen was added to the outside of the tower, a squint was inserted in the south side of the chancel and the present font was made. The nave was rebuilt in 1869 and the chancel enlarged and partly rebuilt in 1870. The tower has a ring of eight bells. James Keene, who had established a bell-foundry at Woodstock, cast the fourth, fifth and seventh bells in 1653. Michael Darbie, who was an itinerant bell-founder in southeast England, cast the tenor bell in 1667. Richard Keene of Woodstock cast the sixth bell in 1696. John Taylor & Co of Loughborough cast the treble, second and third bells in 1905 to complete the current ring. St Stephen's parish is part of the Benefice of Bampton with Clanfield, which also includes the parishes of Aston, Lew and Shifford.

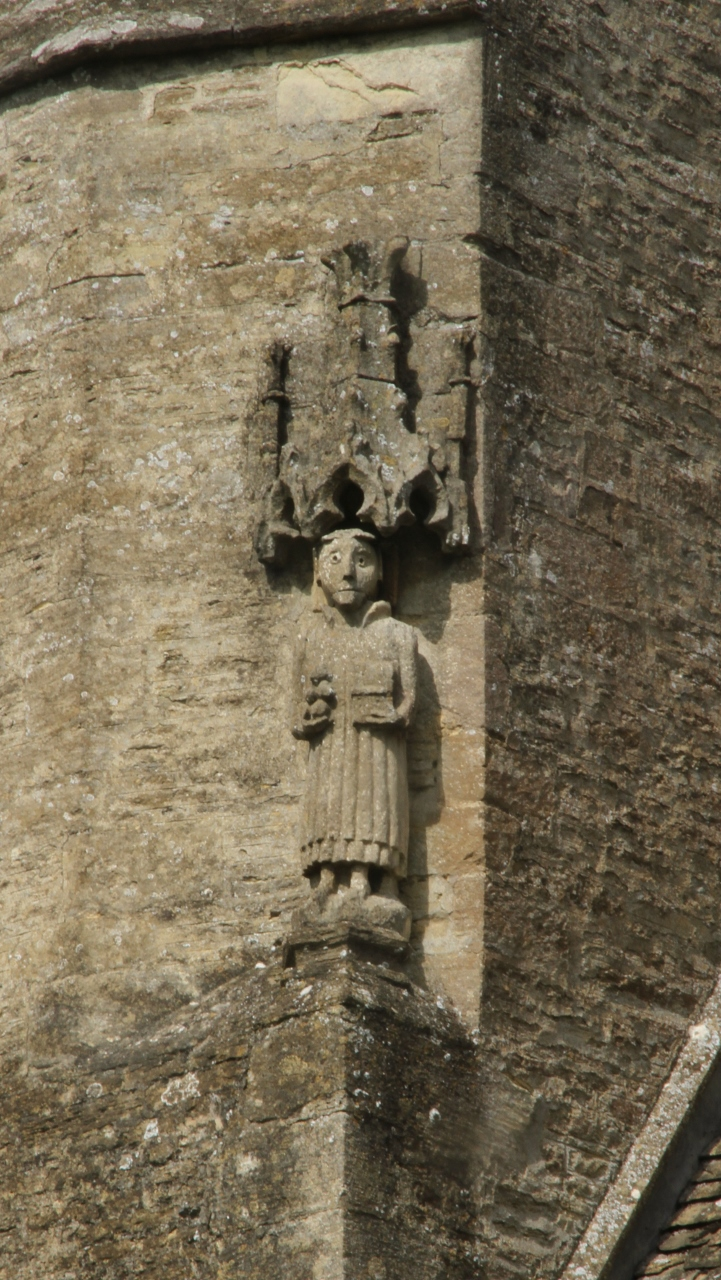
Medieval statue of St Stephen on the church tower

== Economic history ==
The parish had two water mills at Little Clanfield on Little Clanfield Brook. One of them, Little Clanfield Mill, is now a private house but its machinery remains operational. The road between Witney and Clanfield was a turnpike from 1771 until 1874.

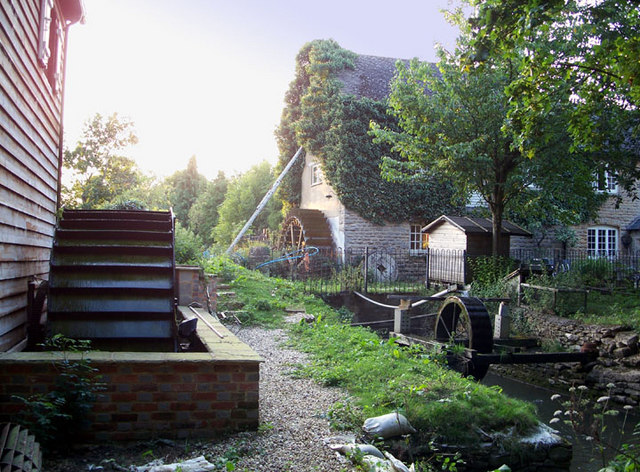
Little Clanfield Mill

== Amenities ==
The Plough Hotel is a three-bay house built of Cotswold stone in about 1660 that is now a public house. From late in the 19th century until the 1950s it was controlled by Garnes Brewery of Burford. In the 1950s Wadworth Brewery of Devizes bought Garnes and thus the Plough. The Masons Arms public house is also a 17th-century Cotswold stone building, recently renamed the Clanfield Tavern. Clanfield Church of England Primary School was founded in 1873 and enlarged in 1991. The village has a post office and general store.

== Sport and leisure ==
The village's association football club, Clanfield F.C., has its ground in Radcot Road and plays in the Hellenic Football League. Clanfield has a Women's Institute.

== Sources ==
- Page, W.H., ed. (1907). A History of the County of Oxford. Victoria County History. Vol. 2: Ecclesiastical History, etc. Westminster: Archibald Constable & Co. pp. 105–106.
- Sherwood, Jennifer; Pevsner, Nikolaus (1974). Oxfordshire. The Buildings of England. Harmondsworth: Penguin Books. pp. 545–547. ISBN 0-14-071045-0.
- Townley, Simon C. (ed.); Colvin, Christina; Cragoe, Carol; Ortenberg, Veronica; Peberdy, R.B.; Selwyn, Nesta; Williamson, Elizabeth (2006). A History of the County of Oxford. Victoria County History. Vol. 15: Carterton, Minster Lovell and Environs: Bampton Hundred (Part Three). Woodbridge: Boydell & Brewer for the Institute of Historical Research. pp. 112–147. ISBN 978-1-90435-606-6.
