= Hailey, Oxfordshire =

Village in England

Coordinates: 51.809°N 1.486°W

Hailey
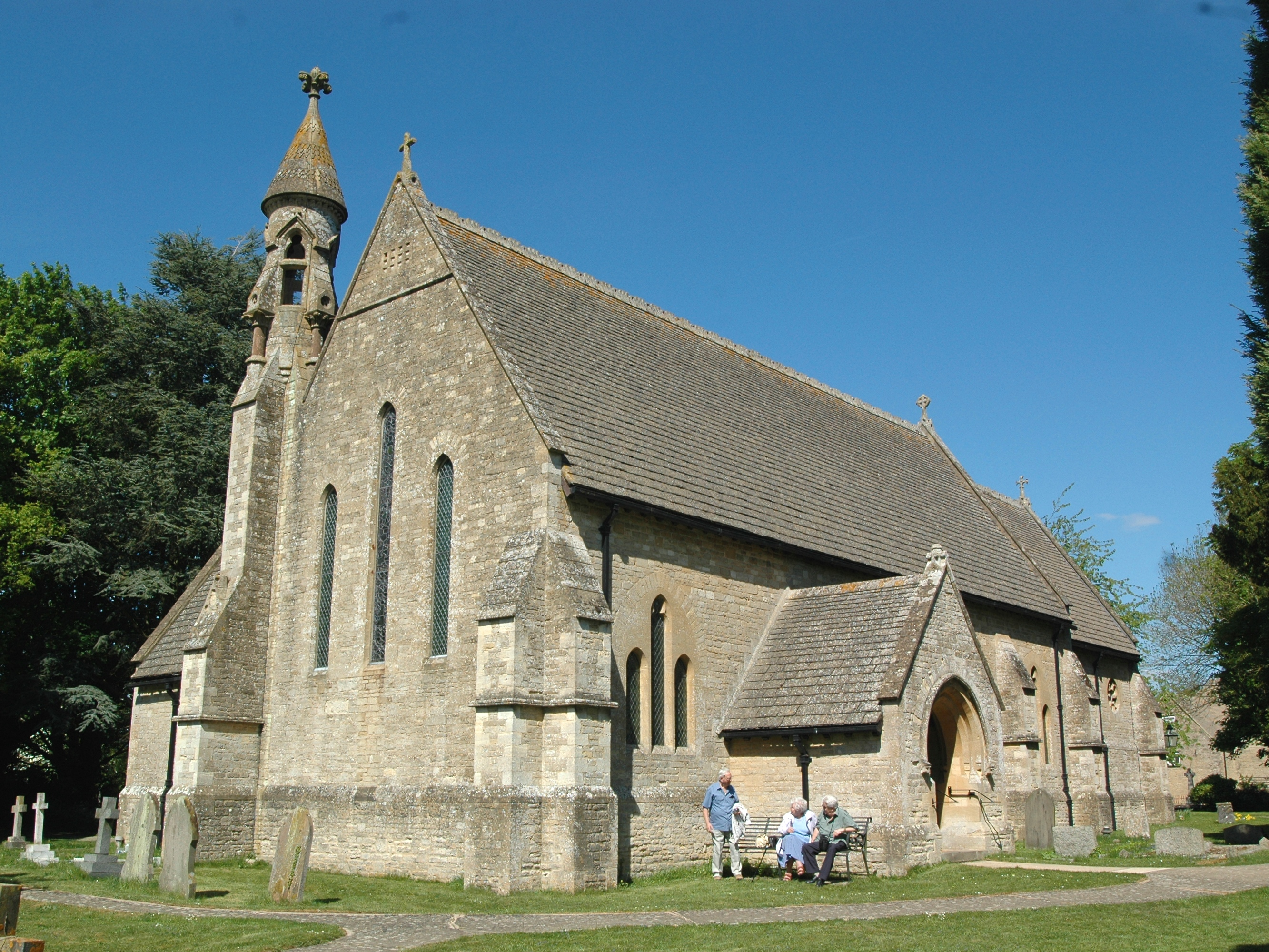
- St John the Evangelist parish church

- Location within Oxfordshire
- Population: 1,208 (parish, including New Yatt) (2011 Census)
- OS grid reference: SP3512
- Civil parish: Hailey
- District: West Oxfordshire
- Shire county: Oxfordshire
- Region: South East
- Country: England
- Sovereign state: United Kingdom
- Post town: Witney
- Postcode district: OX29
- Dialling code: 01993
- Police: Thames Valley
- Fire: Oxfordshire
- Ambulance: South Central
- UK Parliament: Witney
- Website: Welcome to the Parish of Hailey, West Oxfordshire

Hailey is a village and civil parish about 2 miles (3 km) north of Witney, Oxfordshire. The village comprises three neighbourhoods: Middletown on the main road between Witney and Charlbury, Poffley End on the minor road to Ramsden and Delly End on Whiting's Lane. The parish extends from the River Windrush in the south, almost to the village of Ramsden and the hamlet of Wilcote in the north, and it includes the hamlet of New Yatt. The 2011 Census recorded the parish's population as 1,208.

== Manors ==
The Old Manor House at Poffley End was a small house built of Cotswold stone in the 15th century, and was enlarged to its present size in the 16th and 17th centuries. It is a Grade II* listed building. Delly End has a terrace of 17th century cottages. Swanhall Farm, east of Poffley End, was built in about 1700. Hailey Manor at Delly End is an ashlar-fronted early Georgian house of six bays.

== Church and chapel ==
=== Church of England ===
A Church of England parish church was built in 1761 and extended in 1830. It was demolished and replaced by the present Gothic Revival parish church of St John the Evangelist in 1866–69. It was designed by the young Gothic Revival architect Clapton Crabb Rolfe, whose father Rev. George Crabb Rolfe was the perpetual curate. C.C. Rolfe applied his own interpretation of French Gothic architecture. The Oxford Diocesan Architect G.E. Street condemned his initial designs as "needlessly eccentric", so Rolfe modified them. But Sherwood and Pevsner describe the result as "still odd... a fantastic Gothic in colourful materials with bulbous forms and freakish detail". They single out the bell-turret as "particularly bizarre". The font, sited in the north aisle, is from the preceding Georgian parish church. St John's is a Grade II* listed building. Its parish is part of the Benefice of Witney, which also includes Curbridge.

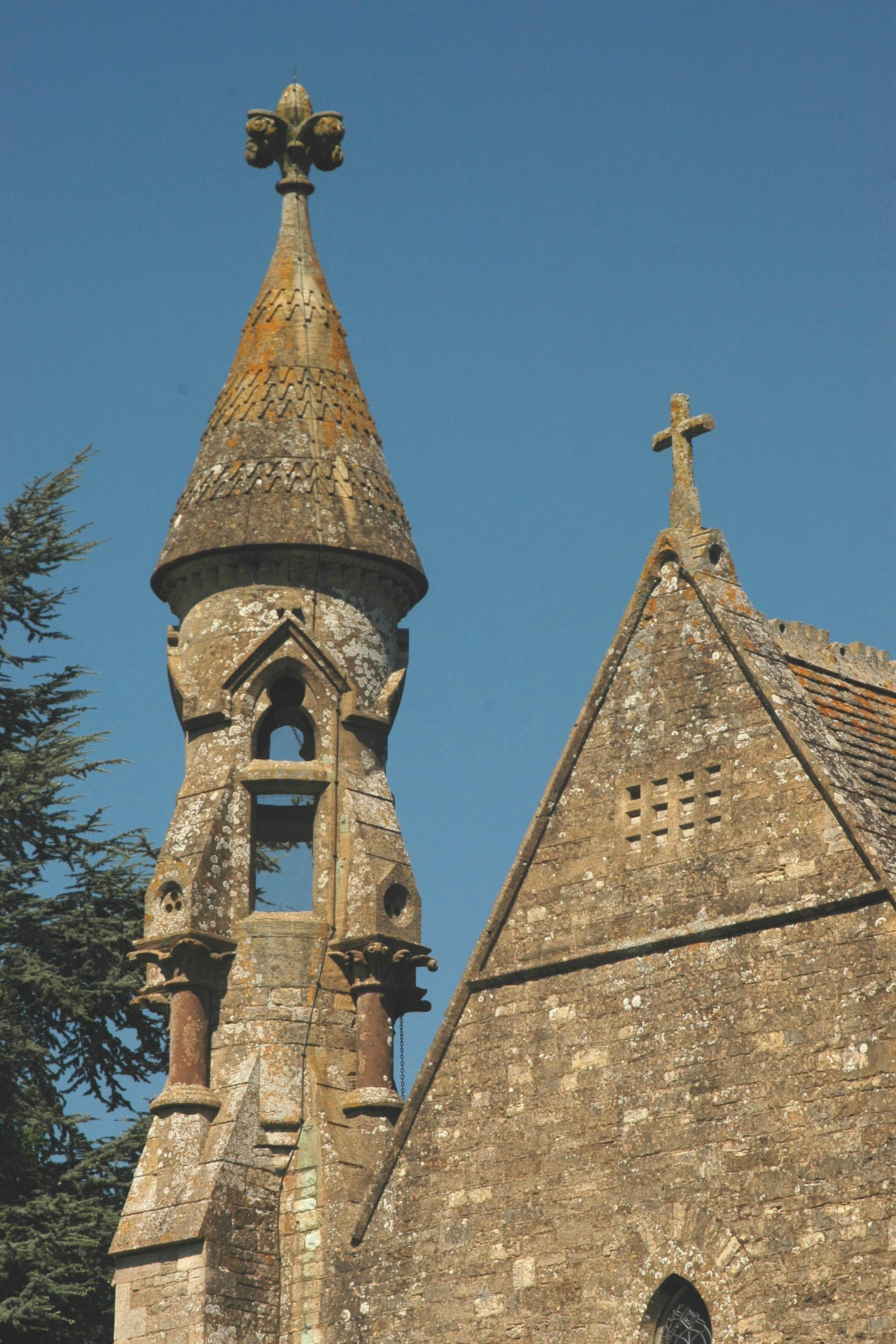
Bell-turret of St John the Evangelist parish church

=== Methodist ===
A Methodist chapel was built in 1908. It is now a private house.

== Economic and social history ==
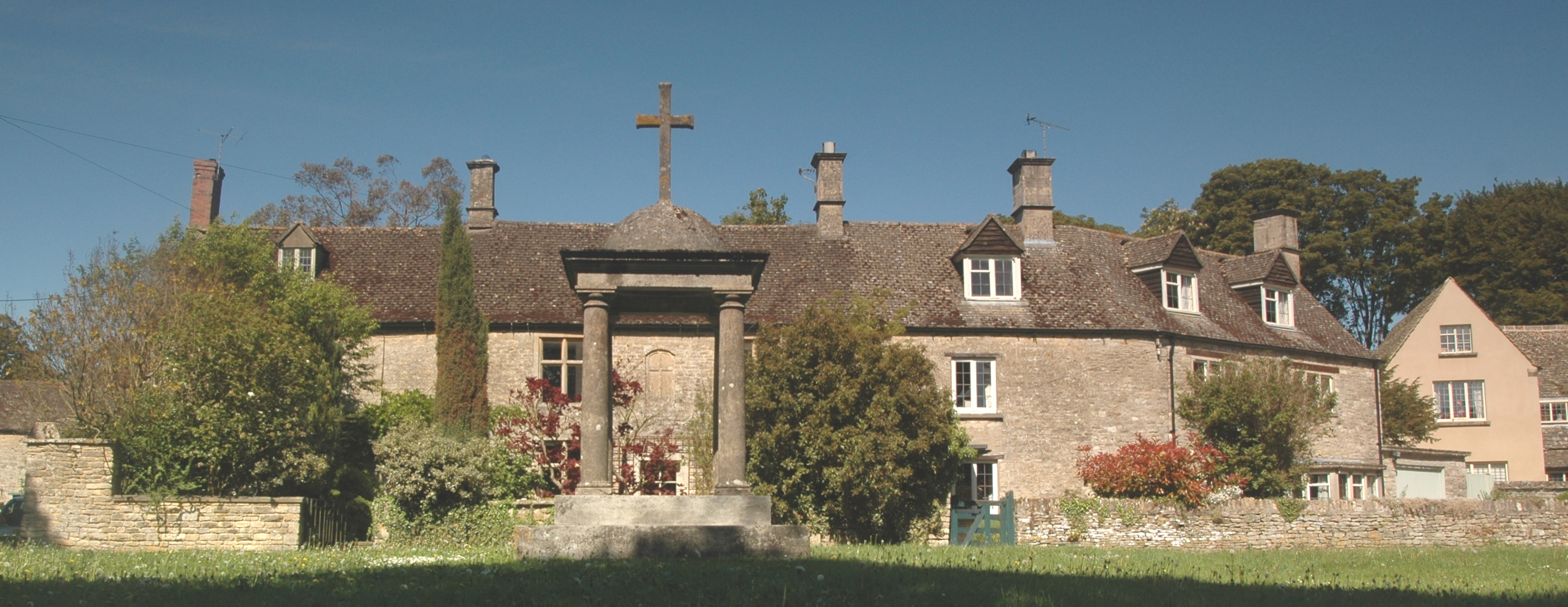
17th century vernacular cottages at Delly End, with the Peace Memorial in front

=== Farming ===
Hailey Inclosure Act 1821
- Act of Parliament
- Parliament of the United Kingdom
- Long title: An Act for allotting Lands within the Hamlet or Township of Hailey, in the Parish of Witney, in the County of Oxford.
- Citation: 1 & 2 Geo. 4. c. 46 Pr.

Dates
- Royal assent: 24 May 1821

The ancient Wychwood royal forest included the whole of Hailey, and the northern part of the parish was mostly woodland, wood-pasture and heath. But from the 13th century onwards assarting reduced the woodland in the north and east of the parish. The endings of local toponyms including Delly, Hailey and Poffley all come from leah, Middle English for a "clearing". The southwest of the parish was farmed on an open field system. Villagers seem to have enlarged the open fields by assarting in the 13th and 14th centuries, and by the early 17th century their combined area was 470 acres (190 ha). Parliament passed the Hailey Inclosure Act 1821 (1 & 2 Geo. 4. c. 46 Pr.), which was implemented in 1822–24.

=== Wool ===
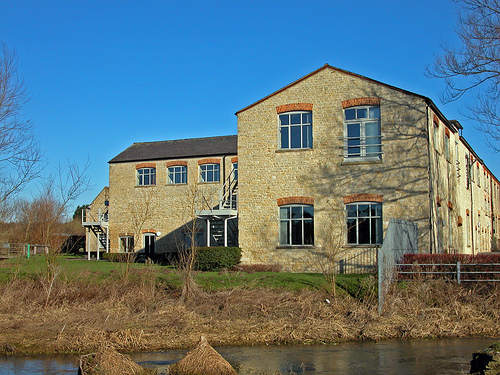
New Mill on the River Windrush

From the early 13th century there was a fulling mill on the Windrush in the south of the parish. It was run down in the latter half of the century, seems to have ceased trading by 1318 and may have been demolished. In the 1580s Thomas Box of Witney bought Burycroft, the land next to the former mill site, and had a new leat dug and mill built. By 1589 it was in production, and it has been called New Mill ever since. From the early 17th century, trades including fulling or tucking, broadweaving and clothing are frequently recorded in Hailey. By the middle of the 18th century, blanket-making dominated Hailey's wool trade as it did Witney's.

By the early 19th century more families seem to have worked in trade and industry than in agriculture. In the early history of the trade many weavers worked at home, but in the 18th and 19th centuries New Mill increasingly dominated Hailey's cloth trade. This was despite fires damaging the mill in the late 18th century and in 1809, 1818 and 1883. The Early family of Witney blanket-makers were renting at least part of the mill by 1818 and operating the whole premises by the 1820s. Legally the mill was in two parts, and in 1830 the Earlys bought one part copyhold and the other part leasehold. Earlys bought the freehold in 1894 and continued blanket-making there until the mid-1960s. It has since been converted to other trades.

=== Blacksmithing ===
Mr T. Harris had a smithy at Witheridge Farm, south of Hailey. Upon his death in February 1960 many of his tools were donated to The Museum of English Rural Life.

=== School ===
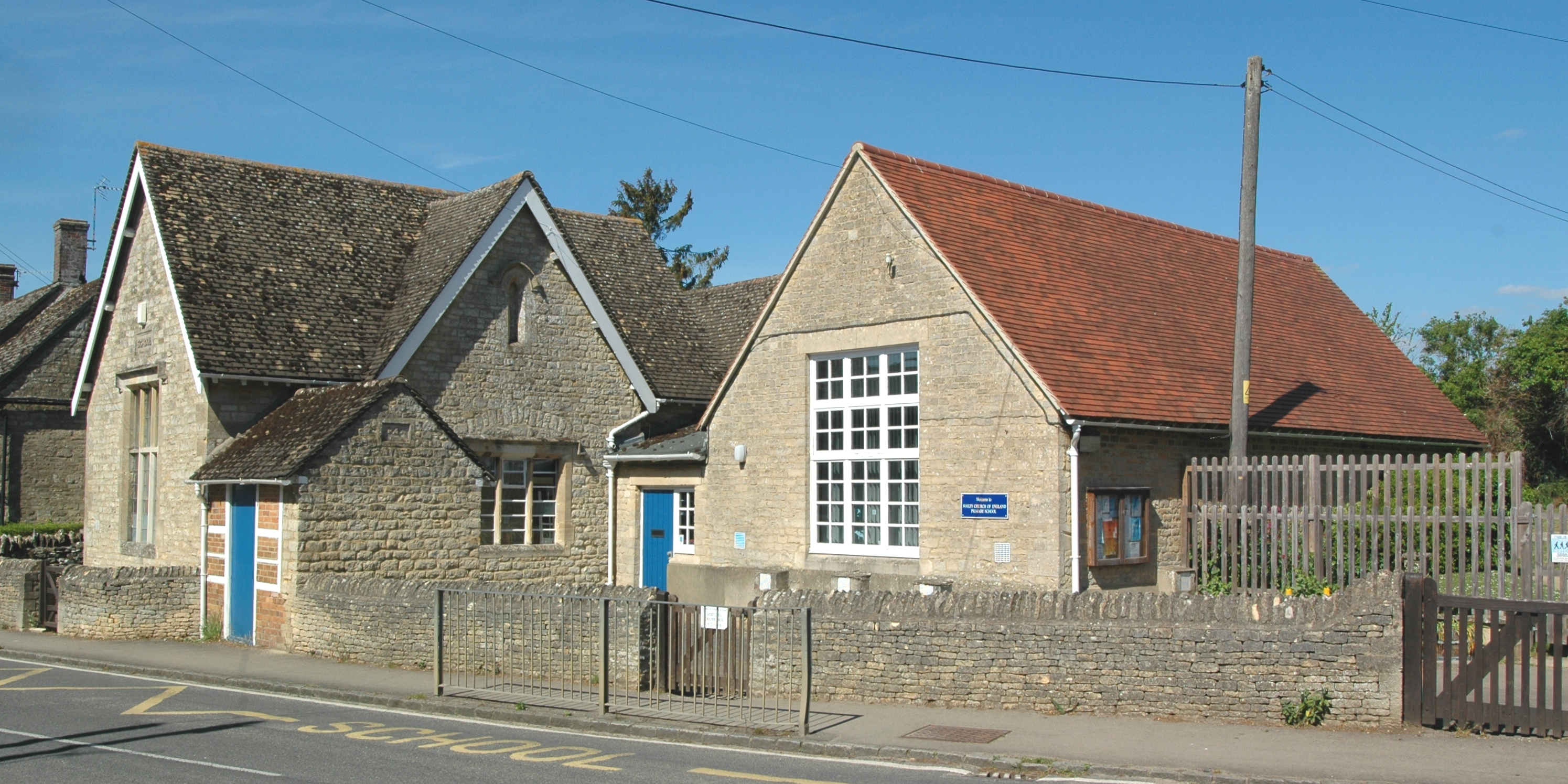
Hailey Primary School in Middletown, built in 1848 and extended in 1892

Hailey Primary School was founded by the charitable bequest of a local farmer's widow, Joan Smith, in 1661. It had 18 pupils in 1802, 28 in 1815 and 30 in 1835. By the 1820s Joan Smith's endowment paid for the education of only 16 of the pupils, and the parents of the remainder had to pay fees. In 1815 the school hoped to adopt the plan of the National Schools as soon as it could recruit a suitable teacher. By 1847 the school had 45 pupils and was accommodated in a run-down cottage in the village. John Williams Clinch of Witney, who was a banker and brewer, gave land next to the Lamb and Flag Inn on which to build a new school. The architect was William Wilkinson of Witney, who was George Crabb Rolfe's brother-in-law.

The new building was completed in 1848 and had capacity for 79 pupils. In 1876 the school had 73 pupils — close to full capacity — so before 1880 capacity was increased to 108. By 1889 it had 107 pupils and needed to expand again. School inspectors called for an infants' classroom, and this was added in 1892. The architect was Clapton Crabb Rolfe, who had designed the parish church and was William Wilkinson's nephew. Oxfordshire County Council took over the school in 1903 and reorganised it as a junior school in 1930. Thereafter Hailey children of secondary school age went to Witney Central School. The school in Hailey became Hailey Church of England Voluntary Controlled School in 1978.

== Amenities ==
Hailey has an 18th-century public house: the Lamb and Flag. The name is a reference to the parish church being dedicated to St John the Evangelist, whose Gospel of John is the source of the Lamb of God as a traditional symbol of Christ. Hailey Cricket Club plays in the Oxford Cricket Association League. Witney Rugby Football Club has its ground in Hailey.

== Sources and further reading ==
- Haskell, John (2011). Hailey's Anglican Churches 250 years 4th August 1761–2011 Church and Church Life. Hailey: Hailey District Church Council.
- Sherwood, Jennifer; Pevsner, Nikolaus (1974). Oxfordshire. The Buildings of England. Harmondsworth: Penguin Books. pp. 628–629. ISBN 0-14-071045-0.
- Sturdy, David (1961–62). "The Old Manor House, Poffley End, Hailey, Oxon" (PDF). Oxoniensia. XXVI–XXVII. Oxford Architectural and Historical Society: 321–323.
- Baggs, A.P.; Chance, Eleanor; Colvin, Christina; Cooper, Janet; Day, C.J.; Selwyn, Nesta; Williamson, Elizabeth; Yates, Margaret (2004). Townley, Simon C. (ed.). A History of the County of Oxford. Victoria County History. Vol. 14: Witney and its Townships: Bampton Hundred (Part Two). Woodbridge: Boydell & Brewer for the Institute of Historical Research. pp. 225–255. ISBN 978-1-90435-625-7.
