= Aston, Oxfordshire =

Village in Oxfordshire, England

Coordinates: 51.725°N 1.508°W

Aston
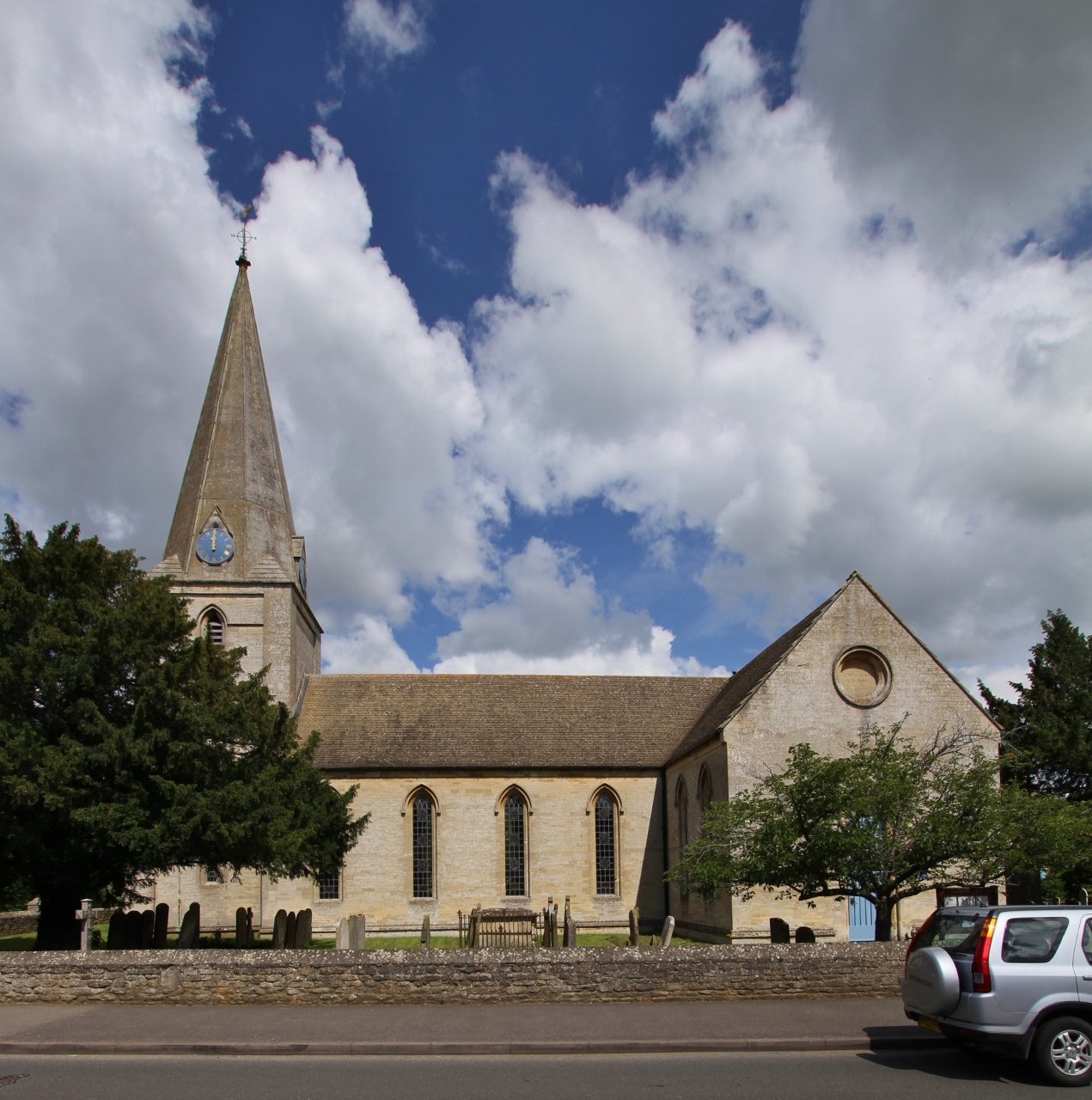
- St James' parish church

- Location within Oxfordshire
- Population: 1,374 (parish, including Cote, Shifford, Chimney)(2011 Census)
- OS grid reference: SP3403
- Civil parish: Aston, Cote, Shifford and Chimney
- District: West Oxfordshire
- Shire county: Oxfordshire
- Region: South East
- Country: England
- Sovereign state: United Kingdom
- Post town: Bampton
- Postcode district: OX18
- Dialling code: 01993
- Police: Thames Valley
- Fire: Oxfordshire
- Ambulance: South Central
- UK Parliament: Witney
- Website: The Parish of Aston, Cote, Chimney & Shifford

Aston is a village about 4 miles (6.4 km) south of Witney in West Oxfordshire, England. The village is part of the civil parish of Aston, Cote, Shifford and Chimney. The southern boundary of the parish is the River Thames. The 2011 Census recorded the parish's population as 1,374.

== History ==
Aston was historically a hamlet in the ancient parish of Bampton.

From the 17th century onwards Aston and the neighbouring hamlet of Cote jointly administered parish functions under the poor laws. As such, "Aston and Cote" became a civil parish in 1866 when the legal definition of 'parish' was changed to be the areas used for administering the poor laws. In 1932 the parish of Aston and Cote was merged with the parish of Chimney (another former hamlet of Bampton) to become a new civil parish called Aston Bampton, which was in turn merged with Shifford (also a former hamlet of Bampton) in 1954 to become Aston Bampton and Shifford. The parish was renamed Aston, Cote, Shifford and Chimney in 1988.

== Parish church ==
The Church of England parish church of Saint James was built in 1839 with only a low squat tower and one bell. Later a spire and second bell were added. The Gothic Revival architect Joseph Clarke restored the building in 1862, even though it was only 23 years old at the time. The architect HGW Drinkwater made further alterations in 1885–89. The present ring of six bells was cast by John Taylor & Co. of Loughborough in 1883, the two original bells being taken in part exchange. Two brass plates in the church commemorate the names of local clergy and churchwardens at the time of the bells' dedication and benefactors who contributed to the cost, the balance of which was raised by public subscription. In 1992 the bells were restored and re-hung by White's of Appleton following two years of local fund-raising. In 1857 Aston, Cote and Shifford were made part of the ecclesiastical parish of Bampton Aston. It now forms part of the benefice of Bampton with Clanfield, which also includes the parish of Lew.

== Pottery ==
Aston Pottery was founded in 1990 and now employs 50 people producing over 120 different patterns on 45 different shapes. The pottery also has a café and gardens.

== Sources ==
- Crossley, Alan; Townley, Simon C.; Baggs, A.P.; Chance, Eleanor; Colvin, Christina; Day, C.J.; Selwyn, Nesta (1996). Currie, C.R.J. (ed.). A History of the County of Oxford. Victoria County History. Vol. 13: Bampton Hundred (Part One). London: Oxford University Press for the Institute of Historical Research. pp. 6–80. ISBN 978-0-19722-790-9.
- Sherwood, Jennifer; Pevsner, Nikolaus (1974). Oxfordshire. The Buildings of England. Harmondsworth: Penguin Books. p. 426. ISBN 0-14-071045-0.
