= Shifford =

Hamlet in Oxfordshire, England

Coordinates: 51.715°N 1.459°W

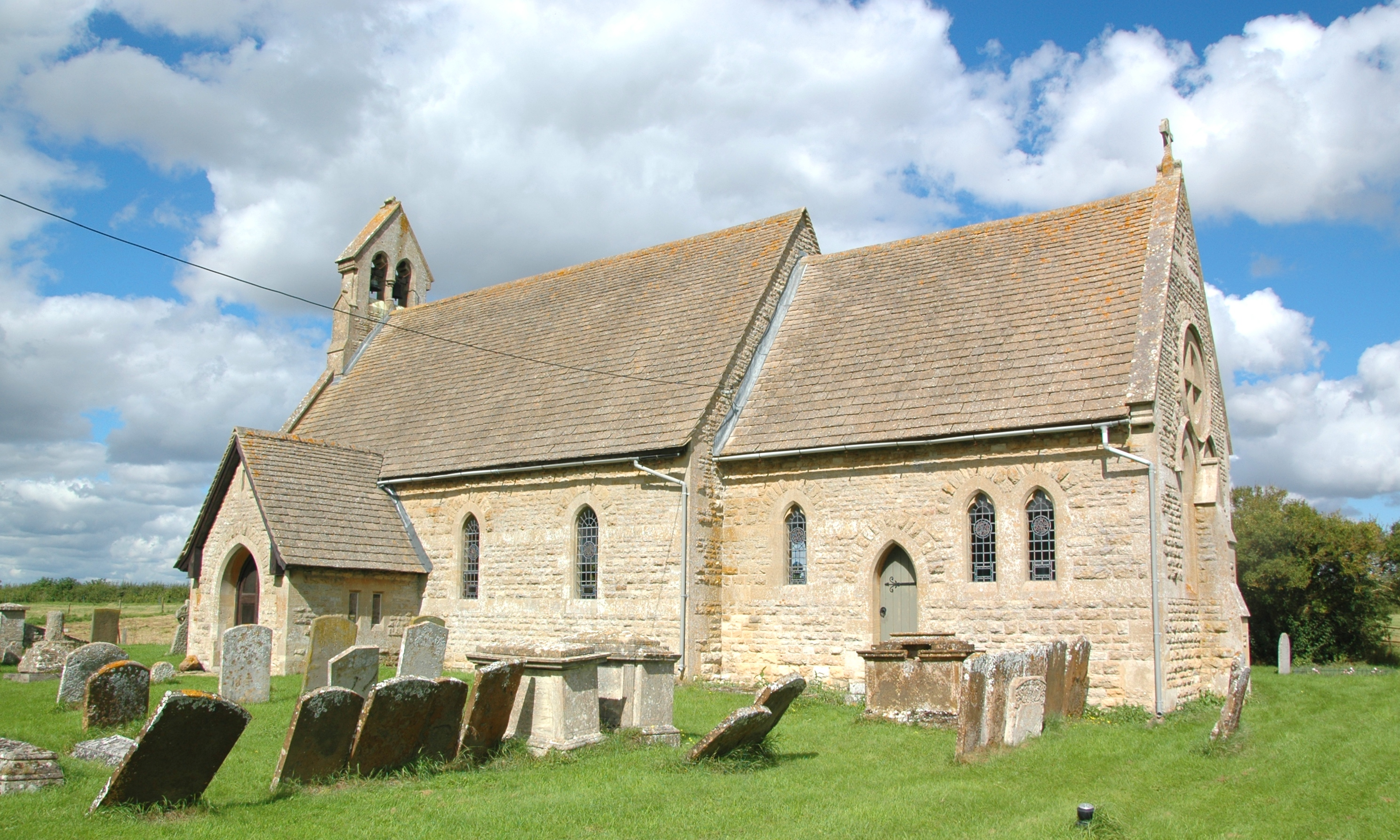
- St Mary's chapel

- Location within Oxfordshire
- OS grid reference: SP374019
- Civil parish: Aston, Cote, Shifford and Chimney
- District: West Oxfordshire
- Shire county: Oxfordshire
- Region: South East
- Country: England
- Sovereign state: United Kingdom
- Post town: Bampton
- Postcode district: OX18
- Dialling code: 01993
- Police: Thames Valley
- Fire: Oxfordshire
- Ambulance: South Central
- UK Parliament: Witney
- Website: Aston, Cote, Chimney and Shifford

Shifford is a hamlet in the civil parish of Aston, Cote, Shifford and Chimney in the West Oxfordshire district of Oxfordshire, England. It is on the north bank of the River Thames about 6 miles (10 km) south of Witney.

== Archaeology ==
There was a modest Iron Age and Roman-era pastoral settlement east of what is now Old Shifford Farm. It was abandoned around the end of the 1st century AD, but a new settlement was established slightly north of the old one toward the end of the 3rd century. The Oxford Archaeological Unit excavated the sites in 1988–89, after which it was excavated as a gravel pit parallel with Brighthampton Cut. Late Iron Age and Roman artefacts found at the site include ceramic loom weights and parts of pots and plates; Roman coins from the 1st to the 4th centuries, but particularly the late 3rd to late 4th centuries; copper items including brooches, a pin and a bracelet, iron items, particularly nails; lead items including weights, pot rivets and lead shot; and stone items including several quern-stones and a whetstone. Bone fragments found at the site came mostly from cattle (16.4%), sheep and goats (10.7%) and horses (10.7%). Farming at the site seems to have been mostly pastoral; there was little evidence of arable cultivation.

== History ==
The settlement arose by a ford across the Thames, from which it derived its toponym ("sheep ford"). It was mentioned in a charter of 1005, when the estate was granted to Eynsham Abbey. A 17th century tradition that Alfred the Great held a council at Shifford arose from a reference to Sifford in the 12th or 13th century poem The Proverbs of Alfred, now thought not to refer to this place. In the 17th century Shifford had between 15 and 23 houses. By 1881 the population had risen to 70 but by 1951, the last year for which separate figures are available, it had fallen to 27. It is now a largely deserted village.

Shifford was historically a hamlet in the ancient parish of Bampton. Civil functions under the poor laws from the 17th century onwards were administered separately for Shifford and other parts of Bampton parish. As such, Shifford became a civil parish in 1866 when the legal definition of 'parish' was changed to be the areas used for administering the poor laws. In 1954, Shifford was merged with the neighbouring parish of Aston Bampton (which covered three other former hamlets of Bampton: Aston, Cote, and Chimney) to become a new civil parish called Aston Bampton and Shifford. The parish was renamed Aston, Cote, Shifford and Chimney in 1988.

== Chapel ==
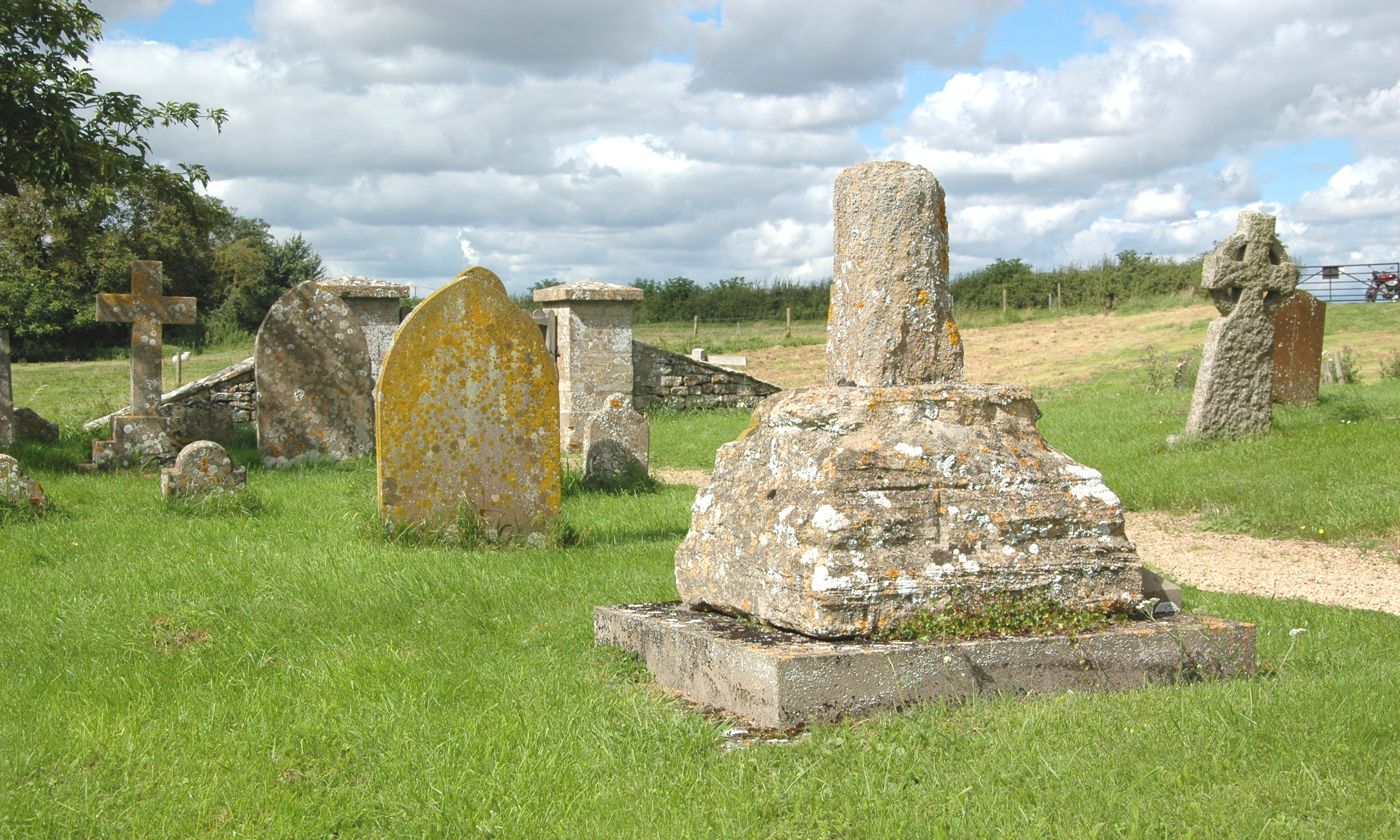
Base and broken shaft of a 15th-century preaching cross (right) in St Mary's churchyard

Shifford was never an ecclesiastical parish but in medieval times it was a dependent chapelry of Bampton. The chapel was later described as "Georgian" and became derelict by the 19th century. In 1863 it was replaced with a Gothic Revival one designed by the architect Joseph Clarke. It is a Grade II listed building.

== Shifford Lock ==
A lock on the River Thames was built in 1898 half a mile upstream from Shifford. It is accessible on foot from Chimney, but not directly from Shifford.

== Sources ==
- "Bampton". British History Online. Victoria County History. 1996. pp. 6–8. "A History of the County of Oxford, Volume 13: Bampton Hundred (Part One)"
- "Shifford: Introduction". British History Online. Victoria County History. 1996. pp. 99–102. "A History of the County of Oxford, Volume 13: Bampton Hundred (Part One)"
- Emery, Frank (1974). Hoskins, W.G. (ed.). The Oxfordshire Landscape. The Making of the English Landscape. London: Hodder & Stoughton. p. 103. ISBN 0-340-04301-6.
- Hey, Gill; et al. (1995). "Iron Age and Roman Settlement at Old Shifford Farm, Standlake". Oxoniensia. LX. Oxfordshire Architectural and Historical Society: 93–175.
- Sherwood, Jennifer; Pevsner, Nikolaus (1974). Oxfordshire. The Buildings of England. Harmondsworth: Penguin Books. p. 754. ISBN 0-14-071045-0.
