= OX postcode area =

Postcode area within the United Kingdom

Oxford
- Postcode area
- Location within the United Kingdom
- Coordinates: 51.792°N 1.293°W
- Sovereign state: United Kingdom
- Postcode area: OX
- Postcode area name: Oxford
- Post towns: 17
- Postcode districts: 28
- Postcode sectors: 146
- Postcodes (live): 19,789
- Postcodes (total): 34,864
- Statistics as at May 2020

The OX postcode area, also known as the Oxford postcode area, is a group of 26 postcode districts in south-central England, within 17 post towns. These cover most of Oxfordshire (including Oxford, Banbury, Abingdon, Bicester, Witney, Didcot, Carterton, Kidlington, Thame, Wantage, Wallingford, Chipping Norton, Chinnor, Woodstock, Watlington, Bampton and Burford), plus very small parts of Northamptonshire, Buckinghamshire, Berkshire, Gloucestershire and Warwickshire.

The original OX6 district for Bicester was recoded to OX25, OX26 and OX27 in 2000, while the OX39 district for Chinnor and the OX49 district for Watlington were formed out of the OX9 district at the same time. In 2001, the original OX8 district for Witney was recoded to OX28 and OX29.

Mail for the OX postcode area is processed at Thames Valley Mail Centre in Swindon, along with mail for the RG and SN postcode areas.

== Coverage ==
The approximate coverage of the postcode districts:

Postcode district	Post town	Coverage	Local authority area(s)
OX1	OXFORD	Central and South Oxford, Kennington, Boars Hill, New Hinksey, South Hinksey, Osney	Oxford, Vale of White Horse
OX2	OXFORD	North and West Oxford, Botley, North Hinksey, Summertown, Wytham, Jericho, Wolvercote	Oxford, Vale of White Horse, Cherwell
OX3	OXFORD	North East Oxford, Beckley, Headington, Marston, Elsfield, Noke, Woodeaton, Woodperry	Oxford, South Oxfordshire, Cherwell
OX4	OXFORD	East Oxford, Cowley, Blackbird Leys, Littlemore, Sandford-on-Thames, Iffley, Rose Hill	Oxford, South Oxfordshire
OX5	KIDLINGTON	Kidlington, Yarnton, Begbroke, Tackley, Murcott, Charlton-on-Otmoor, Fencott, Islip	Cherwell, West Oxfordshire, Buckinghamshire
OX7	CHIPPING NORTON	Chipping Norton, Charlbury, Chadlington, Bledington	West Oxfordshire, Cotswold
OX9	THAME	Thame, Postcombe, Towersey, North Weston	South Oxfordshire
OX10	WALLINGFORD	Wallingford, Berinsfield, Cholsey, Dorchester	South Oxfordshire
OX11	DIDCOT	Didcot, Blewbury, Harwell, Chilton, Aston Tirrold, Aston Upthorpe, South Moreton, Upton	South Oxfordshire, Vale of White Horse
OX12	WANTAGE	Wantage, Grove, Ardington, Charney Bassett, Childrey, Challow (East & West), Denchworth, Farnborough (Berks), Fawley, Ginge (East & West), Hanney (East & West), Hendred (East & West), Kingston Lisle, Letcombe Bassett, Letcombe Regis, Lockinge (East & West), Lyford, Sparsholt	Vale of White Horse, South Oxfordshire, West Berkshire
OX13	ABINGDON	Southmoor, Sunningwell, Frilford, Cothill, Appleton, Longworth, Steventon, Marcham, Shippon, Bayworth, Garford, Besselsleigh, Dry Sandford	Vale of White Horse
OX14	ABINGDON	Abingdon, Appleford-on-Thames, Burcot, Clifton Hampden, Culham, Drayton, Little Wittenham, Long Wittenham, Radley, Milton, Sutton Courtenay	Vale of White Horse, South Oxfordshire
OX15	BANBURY	Bloxham, Drayton, Wroxton, North Newington, South Newington, Swalcliffe, Sibford Gower, Sibford Ferris, Barford St Michael, Barford St John, Deddington, Hempton, Broughton, Hornton, Horley, Balscote, Shenington, Alkerton, Wigginton, Milton, Hook Norton, Milcombe, Shutford, Epwell, Tadmarton, Swerford, Bodicote, Brailes, Edge Hill, Ratley, Upton, Winderton	Cherwell, Stratford-on-Avon, West Oxfordshire
OX16	BANBURY	Banbury	Cherwell
OX17	BANBURY	Adderbury, Appletree, Aynho, Arlescote, Chacombe, Charlton, Chipping Warden, Claydon, Cropredy, Culworth, Edgcote, Farnborough (Warks), Greatworth, Great Bourton, Hanwell, King's Sutton, Little Bourton, Lower Thorpe, Marston St Lawrence, Middleton Cheney, Mollington, Nethercote, Newbottle, Overthorpe, Prescote, Shotteswell, Stuchbury, Sulgrave, Thenford, Thorpe Mandeville, Twyford, Upper Astrop, Wardington, Warkworth, Warmington, Williamscott	Cherwell, West Northamptonshire, Stratford-on-Avon
OX18	BAMPTON, BURFORD, CARTERTON	Alvescot, Asthall, Aston, Bampton, Barrington, Black Bourton, Bradwell, Brize Norton, Burford, Carterton, Chimney, Clanfield, Cote, Fulbrook, Grafton, Holwell, Lew, Little Clanfield, Radcot, Shilton, Signet, Swinbrook, Taynton, Upper Windrush, Upton, Weald, Westwell, Widford, Windrush	West Oxfordshire, Cotswold
OX20	WOODSTOCK	Woodstock, Bladon, Glympton, Kiddington, Woodleys, Wootton	West Oxfordshire
OX25	BICESTER	Ambrosden, Arncott, Blackthorn, Caulcott, Duns Tew, Little Chesterton, Lower Heyford, Merton, Middle Aston, Middleton Stoney, North Aston, Piddington, Rousham, Somerton, Steeple Aston, Steeple Barton, Upper Heyford, Wendlebury, Weston-on-the-Green	Cherwell, West Oxfordshire
OX26	BICESTER	Bicester, Chesterton, Launton	Cherwell
OX27	BICESTER	Ardley, Bainton, Baynards Green, Bucknell, Caversfield, Charndon, Fewcott, Fringford, Fritwell, Godington, Hardwick, Hethe, Marsh Gibbon, Newton Morrell, Poundon, Souldern, Stoke Lyne, Stratton Audley, Tusmore	Cherwell, Buckinghamshire
OX28	WITNEY	Witney	West Oxfordshire
OX29	WITNEY	Barnard Gate, Brighthampton, Church Hanborough, Combe, Crawley, Curbridge, Ducklington, Eynsham, Freeland, Hailey, Hardwick, High Cogges, Long Hanborough, New Yatt, Newbridge, North Leigh, East End (North Leigh), Old Shifford, Shifford, Standlake, Stanton Harcourt, Stonesfield, Sutton, Yelford	West Oxfordshire
OX33	OXFORD	Wheatley, Forest Hill, Holton, Horspath, Horton-cum-Studley, Littleworth, Milton Common, Stanton St. John, Waterperry, Waterstock, Woodperry	South Oxfordshire, Cherwell
OX39	CHINNOR	Chinnor, Sydenham, Kingston Blount, Crowell, Henton, Emmington	South Oxfordshire
OX44	OXFORD	Ascott, Chalgrove, Chippinghurst, Chiselhampton, Cuddesdon, Denton, Garsington, Great Haseley, Great Milton, Little Baldon, Little Haseley, Little Milton, Marsh Baldon, Nuneham Courtenay, Stadhampton, Toot Baldon	South Oxfordshire
OX49	WATLINGTON	Watlington, Lewknor, Aston Rowant, Pyrton, Brightwell Baldwin, Britwell Salome, Cuxham, Shirburn, Christmas Common, Easington	South Oxfordshire

== Map ==
OX postcode area map, showing postcode districts in red and post towns in grey text, with links to nearby CV, GL, HP, MK, NN, RG and SN postcode areas.

== See also ==
- Postcode Address File
- List of postcode areas in the United Kingdom
