= Bainton, Oxfordshire =

Hamlet in Oxfordshire, England

Coordinates: 51.939°N 1.157°W

Bainton
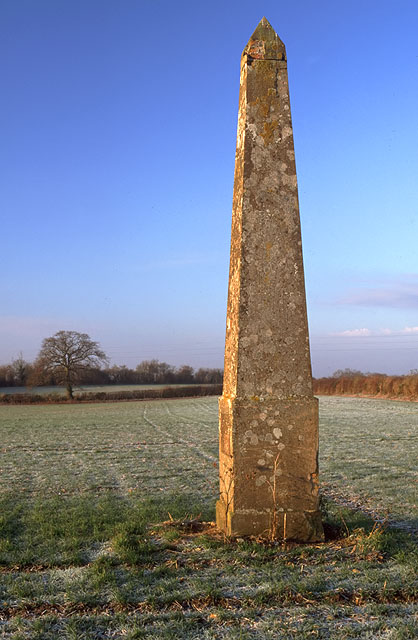
- Monument at Bainton Erected in 1812 by Sir Thomas Mostyn Bart MP, master of the Bicester Foxhounds 1800 to 1830, in memory of his favourite hound "Lady".

- Location within Oxfordshire
- OS grid reference: SP580270
- District: Cherwell
- Shire county: Oxfordshire
- Region: South East
- Country: England
- Sovereign state: United Kingdom
- Post town: Bicester
- Postcode district: OX27
- Dialling code: 01869
- Police: Thames Valley
- Fire: Oxfordshire
- Ambulance: South Central
- UK Parliament: Banbury

Bainton is a hamlet comprising a cluster of farms in the civil parish of Stoke Lyne, about 3 miles (5 km) north of the centre of Bicester.

== History ==
The toponym comes from the Old English for "Bada's farm".

The Domesday Book records that in 1086 Ghilo de Picquigny held the manor of Bainton.

In 1279, Bainton had 17 households. In 1316, 18 villagers were assessed to pay taxes but by 1520, the figure had fallen to five. By the 1950s Bainton comprised only four farmhouses and a cottage.

In 1530, the manor was sold to Edward Peckham, cofferer to Henry VIII and John Williams, later 1st Baron Williams de Thame. In 1613 Edward Ewer of Bucknell sold the manor to Sir William Cope, 2nd Baronet of Hanwell for £5,300. A legal dispute between them ensued, which ended with Ewer recovering the manor in 1628. The Ewer family could not afford to keep Bainton, and sold the manor again in 1637.

By the middle of the 17th century, Bainton had been converted from arable farming to pasture. This required less labour so the hamlet became depopulated.

Bainton Manor Farm is a coursed rubblestone house. It was constructed in either the latter part of the 16th or earlier part of the 17th century, during the Great Rebuilding of England, originally as the manor house. In 1783 John Warde, founder and first Master of the Bicester Hunt, was using it as a hunting-box, Joseph Bullock of Caversfield had bought the manor and the two men together built stables and kennels there. Aboout 330 yards (300 m) northwest of the hamlet, an obelisk marks the grave of a favourite foxhound.

== Sources ==
- Lobel, Mary D, ed. (1959). A History of the County of Oxford, Volume 6. Victoria County History. pp. 312–323.
- Sherwood, Jennifer; Pevsner, Nikolaus (1974). Oxfordshire. The Buildings of England. Harmondsworth: Penguin Books. p. 789. ISBN 0-14-071045-0.
