= Chimney, Oxfordshire =

Hamlet in Oxfordshire, England

Coordinates: 51.706°N 1.483°W

Chimney
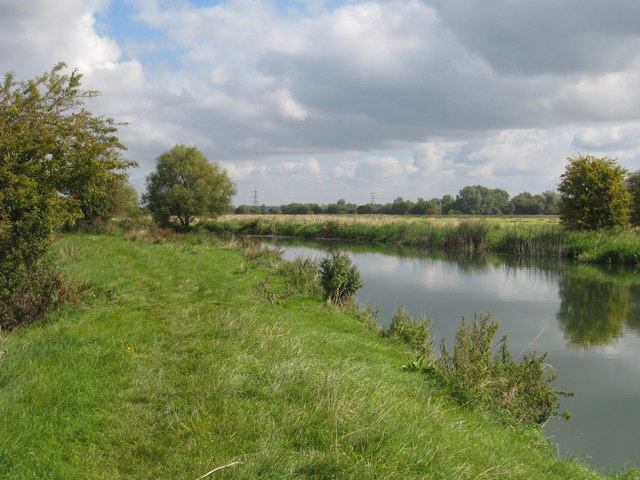
- Chimney Meadows on the River Thames

- Location within Oxfordshire
- OS grid reference: SP3500
- Civil parish: Aston, Cote, Shifford and Chimney
- District: West Oxfordshire
- Shire county: Oxfordshire
- Region: South East
- Country: England
- Sovereign state: United Kingdom
- Post town: Bampton
- Postcode district: OX18
- Dialling code: 01993
- Police: Thames Valley
- Fire: Oxfordshire
- Ambulance: South Central
- UK Parliament: Witney
- Website: Aston, Cote, Chimney and Shifford

Chimney is a hamlet and in the civil parish of Aston, Cote, Shifford and Chimney, in the West Oxfordshire district of Oxfordshire, England. It is on the River Thames near Shifford Lock, 6 miles (9.7 km) south of Witney. Chimney Meadows 620 acres (250 ha) is the largest nature reserve managed by the Berkshire, Buckinghamshire and Oxfordshire Wildlife Trust.

== History ==
Chimney's toponym is derived from Old English, meaning "Island of a man named Ceomma". A series of ring ditches to the west of the hamlet have been scheduled as an ancient monument, as has an oval causewayed enclosure which is approximately 150 metres (490 ft) across. A large Anglo-Saxon cemetery, in use from the mid 10th century to the mid 11th century, has been found west of Chimney Farm. Chimney has been a small settlement since then. There were about 18 households in the 13th century, and the population reached a peak of 46 in 1821. In 1931, the last year for which separate figures are available, the population was 24.

Two late 17th century cottages at Chimney Farm have been designated as Grade II listed buildings, as has the Lower Farmhouse.

Chimney was historically a hamlet in the ancient parish of Bampton. Civil functions under the poor laws from the 17th century onwards were administered separately for Chimney and other parts of Bampton parish. As such, Chimney became a civil parish in 1866 when the legal definition of 'parish' was changed to be the areas used for administering the poor laws. In 1932, Chimney was merged with the neighbouring parish of Aston and Cote (also formerly part of Bampton) to become a new civil parish called Aston Bampton, which was in turn merged with Shifford (another former hamlet of Bampton) in 1954 to become Aston Bampton and Shifford. The parish was renamed Aston, Cote, Shifford and Chimney in 1988.

== Geography ==
The area lies on alluvial deposits from the River Thames producing calcareous clayey soils of the Thames series. Chimney Meadows is a 620 acres (250 ha) national nature reserve and Site of Special Scientific Interest which forms part of the floodplain of the River Thames. It includes wild flower meadows with cowslip, yellow rattle, common knapweed, oxeye daisy and pepper-saxifrage which supports insects, wildfowl and waders. It is the largest nature reserve managed by the Berkshire, Buckinghamshire and Oxfordshire Wildlife Trust, who took it over in 2003.

== Sources ==
- Crossley, Alan; Currie, C.R.J. (eds.); Baggs, A.P.; Chance, Eleanor; Colvin, Christina; Day, C.J.; Selwyn, Nesta; Townley, Simon C. (1996). A History of the County of Oxford, Volume 13: Bampton Hundred (Part One). Victoria County History. pp. 6–62, 80–86.
