= Lew, Oxfordshire =

Village in Oxfordshire, England

Coordinates: 51.756°N 1.531°W

Lew
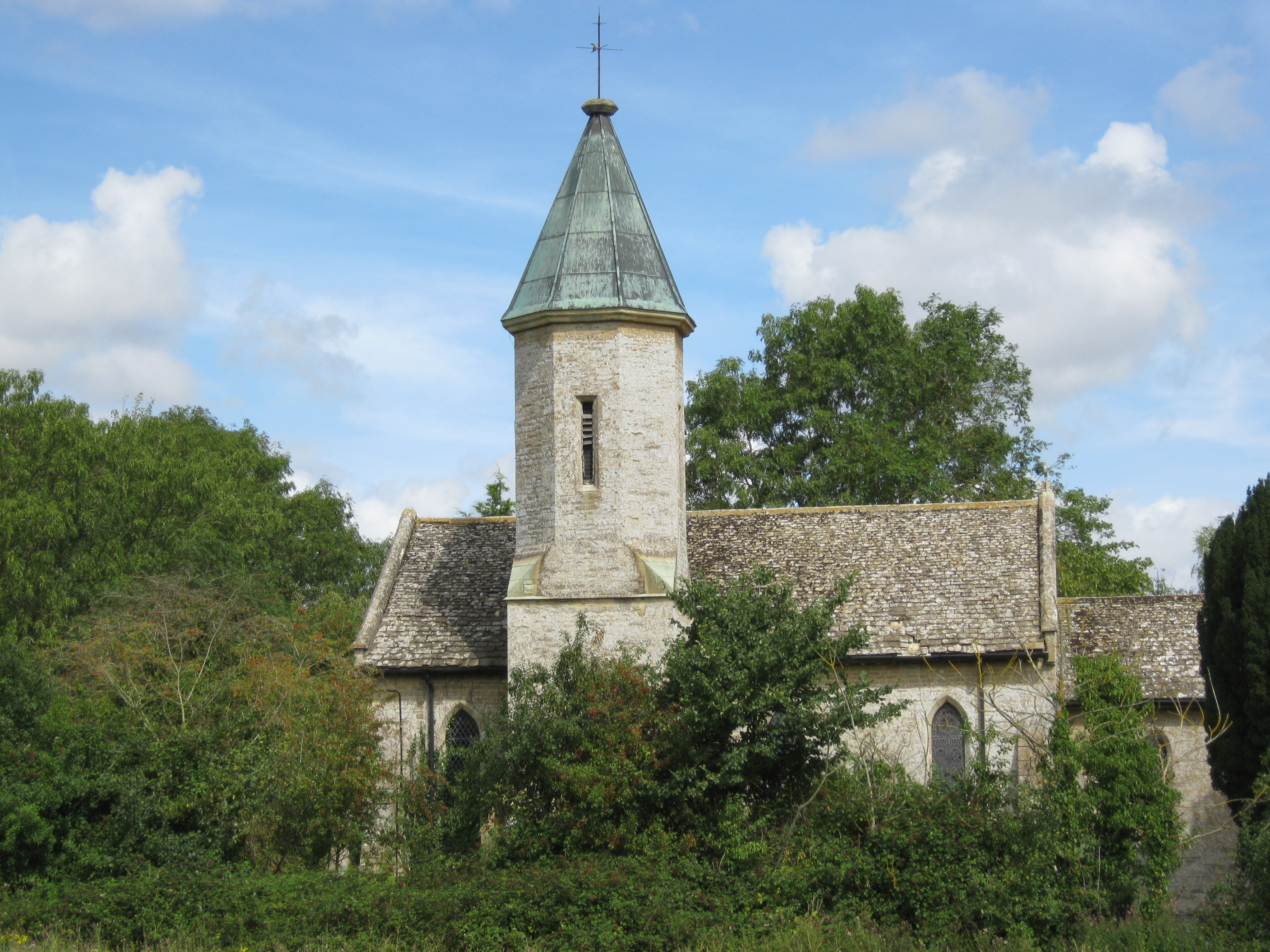
- Holy Trinity parish church

- Location within Oxfordshire
- Population: 71 (Parish, 2021)
- OS grid reference: SP3206
- Civil parish: Lew
- District: West Oxfordshire
- Shire county: Oxfordshire
- Region: South East
- Country: England
- Sovereign state: United Kingdom
- Post town: Witney
- Postcode district: OX18
- Dialling code: 01993
- Police: Thames Valley
- Fire: Oxfordshire
- Ambulance: South Central
- UK Parliament: Witney

Lew is a village and civil parish about 2 1/2 miles (4 km) southwest of Witney in the West Oxfordshire district of Oxfordshire, England. At the 2021 census the parish had a population of 71. It shares a grouped parish council with the neighbouring parish of Curbridge.

== History ==
Evidence of early human habitation in the parish includes a tumulus, probably Anglo-Saxon, on a 350 feet (110 m) high hill west of the village. The village's place-name, recorded as Hlæwe in 984, means "tumulus" in Old English. Until the 19th century Lew was a township in the parish of Bampton. It became a separate ecclesiastical parish in 1857, called Bampton Lew. The parish was united with Bampton in 1917, and since 1976 has formed part of the benefice of Bampton with Clanfield. Lew was made a separate civil parish in 1866.

== Parish church ==
The Church of England parish church of the Holy Trinity was designed in a 13th-century style by the architect William Wilkinson and built in 1841.

== Governance ==
There are three tiers of local government covering Curbridge, at parish, district and county level: Curbridge and Lew Parish Council, West Oxfordshire District Council, and Oxfordshire County Council. The parish council is a grouped parish council, also covering the neighbouring parish of Curbridge. The parish council meets at Curbridge Parish Hall.

== Sources ==
- Blair, John (1994) [1977]. Anglo-Saxon Oxfordshire. Stroud: Alan Sutton Publishing for Oxfordshire Books. ISBN 9-780750-901475.
- Baggs, AP; Chance, Eleanor; Colvin, Christina; Day, CJ; Selwyn, Nesta; Townley, Simon C (1996). Crossley, Alan; Currie, CRJ (eds.). A History of the County of Oxford. Victoria County History. Vol. 13: Bampton Hundred (Part One). London: Oxford University Press for the Institute of Historical Research. pp. 90–99. ISBN 978-0-19722-790-9.
- Ekwall, Eilert (1960) [1936]. Concise Oxford Dictionary of English Place-Names (4th ed.). Oxford: Oxford University Press. ISBN 0198691033.
- Mills, AD; Room, D (2003). A Dictionary of British Place-Names. Oxford: Oxford University Press. Lew. ISBN 0-19-852758-6.
- Sherwood, Jennifer; Pevsner, Nikolaus (1974). Oxfordshire. The Buildings of England. Harmondsworth: Penguin Books. pp. 682–683. ISBN 0-14-071045-0.
