= Oxfordshire Architectural and Historical Society =

English historical organization

The Oxfordshire Architectural and Historical Society (OAHS) has existed in one form or another since at least 1839, although with its current name only since 1972. Its annual publication, Oxoniensia, has been produced since 1936.

== Overview ==
The Society was founded in 1839 as the Society for Promoting the Study of Gothic Architecture. In 1848, it was renamed to become the Oxford Architectural Society and in 1860 it was re-founded as the Oxford Architectural and Historical Society. In 1972, the society was renamed to its current name when it merged with the Oxfordshire Archaeological Society.

The Society attracts members who are interested in the archaeology, architecture and history of Oxford and Oxfordshire in England. As well as the annual publication of Oxoniensia, OAHS organises lectures and excursions, which are open to all members.

The OAHS has a reciprocal arrangement with the Oxford University Archaeological Society, which allows the members of one body to attend meetings and excursions organised by the other.

The OAHS is affiliated to the Council for British Archaeology.

== Oxoniensia ==
Oxoniensia, started in 1936, is the annual journal of OAHS, which is sent to all members.

== See also ==
- Oxford Historical Society
