= Lucy Faithfull, Baroness Faithfull =

British social worker (1910–1996)

Lucy Faithfull, Baroness Faithfull, OBE (26 October 1910 – 13 March 1996) was a British social worker and children's campaigner. She founded the Lucy Faithfull Foundation, the only nationwide UK child protection charity working to prevent child sexual abuse.

== Background ==
Faithfull was born in South Africa, the daughter of a nurse and an army officer. When her father was killed in the First World War in 1916, her mother returned to England. She was educated at Bournemouth and studied then at the Sorbonne, which she financed by work in a nursery in Paris. In 1978 the University of Warwick made her an Honorary Doctor of Letters and in 1995, she also received the same degree from the Oxford Brookes University. She was elected an honorary fellow of St Hilda's College, Oxford in 1992.

== Career ==
After her education Faithfull worked at Birmingham Settlement, a charity working with vulnerable people in Birmingham, UK, running clubs and acting as a caseworker for three years until 1935. She then entered the education department of the London County Council as a care committee organiser. During the Second World War and until 1948, she served as a regional welfare officer for the evacuee programme. In the following decade she was employed as an inspector in the children's department of the Home Office.

Faithfull joined the Oxford City Council in 1958 as one of the first children's officers. She was appointed its Director of Social Services in 1970, retiring four years later. In the New Year's Honours 1972, she was appointed as an Officer of the Order of the British Empire. Four years later, in 1976, Margaret Thatcher, then leader of the opposition, contacted Faithfull saying she wanted propose her for a seat in the House of Lords and after an initial refusal she accepted a life peerage with the title Baroness Faithfull, of Wolvercote, in the County of Oxfordshire on 26 January. In the House, she was instrumental in the passing of the Children Act 1989. She helped to establish, and from 1995 chaired, the All Party Parliamentary Group for Children. She was a vociferous opponent of Home Secretary, Michael Howard's Criminal Justice and Public Order Bill of 1994 which proposed the establishment of secure 'training centres' in the grounds of adult prisons for children aged between 12 and 14, arguing that locking up children is ineffective and that the huge cost of these could be better spent intervening with families at an earlier stage.

She was trustee of a number of voluntary organisations, notably the Caldecott Community, and Bessels Leigh schools. She was vice-president of the National Association of Voluntary Hostels from 1978 and of Barnardo's from 1989. Faithfull supported the National Children's Bureau, of which she was president. In 1993 she founded the Lucy Faithfull Foundation, which works as a child protection agency helping sexually abused children and their families. She died in London in 1996.

An Oxfordshire Blue Plaque in her honour was unveiled at her home in Woodstock Road, Oxford on 9 May 2026.
