= Dunfermline (disambiguation) =

Dunfermline is a city in Scotland.

Dunfermline may also refer to:

- Dunfermline (district) a local government district from 1975 to 1996
- Dunfermline (Parliament of Scotland constituency), prior to 1707
- Dunfermline (Scottish Parliament constituency)
- Dunfermline (UK Parliament constituency)
- Dunfermline Palace, Scottish historic building
- Dunfermline (horse), a racehorse
- Dunfermline Athletic F.C., a football club
- Dunfermline College of Physical Education
- Dunfermline City railway station
- Dunfermline, Illinois
- Dunfermline (Grenada)
