= Dunfermline College of Physical Education =

Teacher training college

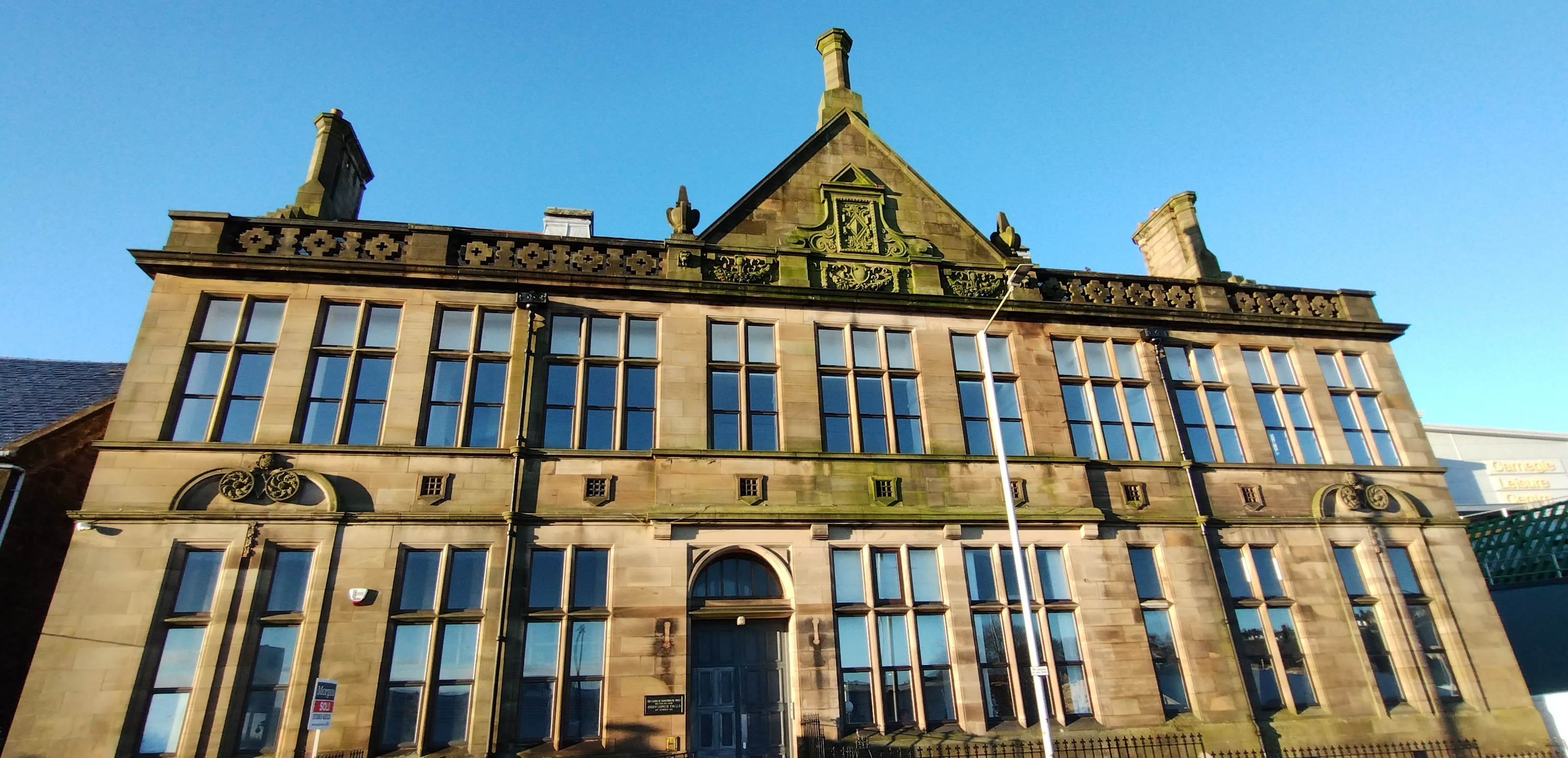
- The former college building of Dunfermline College of Physical Education at 65 Inglis Street, Dunfermline, which opened in 1914
- Motto: Efforts are Successes
- Type: Physical education teacher training college
- Active: 1905–1987
- Location: Dunfermline, Aberdeen, Edinburgh
- Merged with: Moray House College of Education, University of Edinburgh

Dunfermline College of Physical Education, was a college for training teachers of physical education and hygiene in Scotland. The college was established in Dunfermline in 1905, moved to Aberdeen in 1950, and merged with Moray House College of Education, University of Edinburgh, in 1987.

== History ==
=== Dunfermline ===
Dunfermline College of Physical Education was founded on 4 October 1905 as Dunfermline College of Hygiene and Physical Training, following the Report of the Royal Commission on Physical Training in Scotland published two years previously in 1903. Funding for the college was provided by Andrew Carnegie, who had established a trust to promote the physical wellbeing of the children of his home town of Dunfermline. The college's first principal was Flora Ogston, daughter of Sir Alexander Ogston, Regius Professor of Surgery, University of Aberdeen, who had trained at Chelsea College of Physical Education from 1901 - 1903. Other staff at this time included Warden of the College Ethel Adair Roberts, a graduate of Martina Bergman-Österberg's Hampstead Physical Training College, and member of the Ling Association which established the rules of netball; Leila Rendel, co-founder of the Caldecott Community; and Evelyn Perry, who was appointed by the War Office as physical training instructor of HM Munitions Factory, Gretna in 1916. Ogston stepped down as principal in 1906 when she married and was replaced by Ethel Roberts. Roberts held the post of principal for two years until her own marriage in 1908, when she was replaced Mary Stewart Tait.

Ordinary Diplomas and Diplomas with Honours were awarded to students who completed the college's two-year course. The course included theoretical and practical aspects of physical education, anatomy and physiology, Pehr Henrik Ling's Swedish gymnastics, remedial massage and voice production. Holders of the Diploma were recognised as qualified teachers of Physical Education on condition that they had also undertaken the necessary teacher training.

Although it was established as a women's college, men were also admitted from 1908 onwards. In 1909 the college was recognised by the Scottish Education Department as a "central institution for the purpose of the Education (Scotland) Act of 1908", and became the central training institution for school medical officers throughout Scotland. Tait resigned as principal in 1910 and was replaced by interim principal M. L. Brailsford, until Dr A. T. Mackenzie was appointed in 1912.

When it was founded, the college had one gymnasium located at Canmore Street Baths in Dunfermline. In 1909 a new college building was designed by David Barclay of Glasgow architect firm, H & D Barclay. The foundation stone was laid at 65 Inglis Street, Dunfermline, in 1912, with the new building opening in 1914. At this point the college was renamed Dunfermline College of Hygiene and Physical Education. Abbey Park House at 15 Abbey Park Place was acquired in 1905 as the college's first residential hostel for female students, followed by the British Linen Bank Agent's House on Canmore Street in 1919, and St Leonard's Hill mansion on Queensferry Road in 1931.

In 1921, the college became associated with the National Committee for the Training of Teachers in Scotland and in 1931 the organisation established a management committee to oversee the management of the college. A voluntary third year was added to the degree programme in 1928 and became compulsory the following year in 1929.

As a result of pressure on college resources and increased demand for male physical education teachers, male students, were transferred to the new Scottish School of Physical Education, which opened at Jordanhill College in Glasgow in 1931, and DCHPE reverted to training women only. Principal Mackenzie transferred to Jordanhill along with the male students in 1931 and Helen Drummond took up the post of principal of the women's college.

From 1939-46 the college temporarily moved to the Teachers' Training College in Aberdeen, as its buildings in Dunfermline were requisitioned by the Royal Navy during World War II.

=== Aberdeen ===
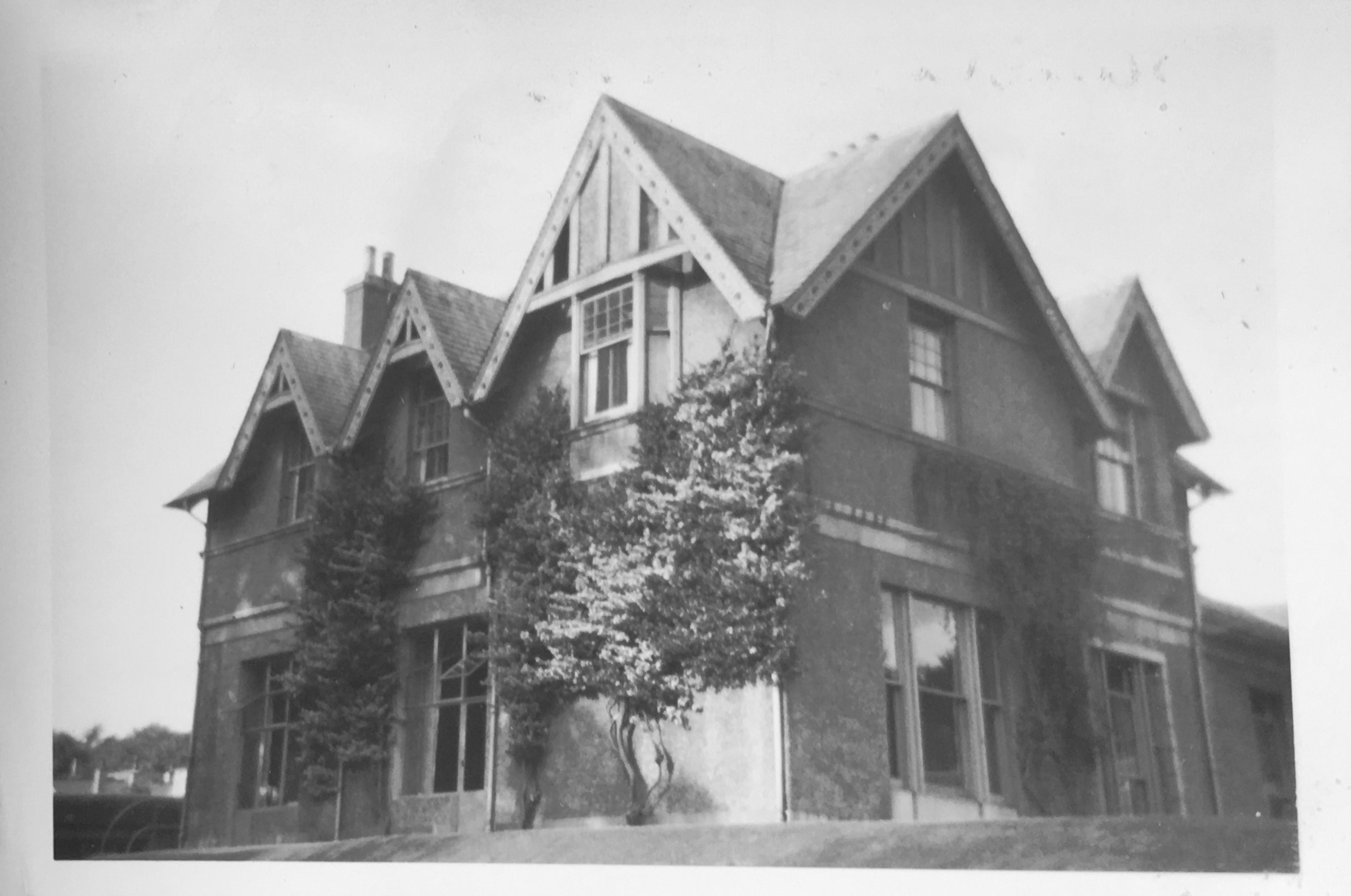
Kepplestone House hostel, Aberdeen

By 1950 the college had outgrown its site in Dunfermline so it transferred to Woolmanhill in Aberdeen, hostel premises were acquired at Queen's Road, Rubislaw and Kepplestone House. At this time the college changed its name to Dunfermline College of Physical Education, Aberdeen, and as it was no longer located in Dunfermline, the Carnegie Dunfermline Trust ended its connection with the institution.

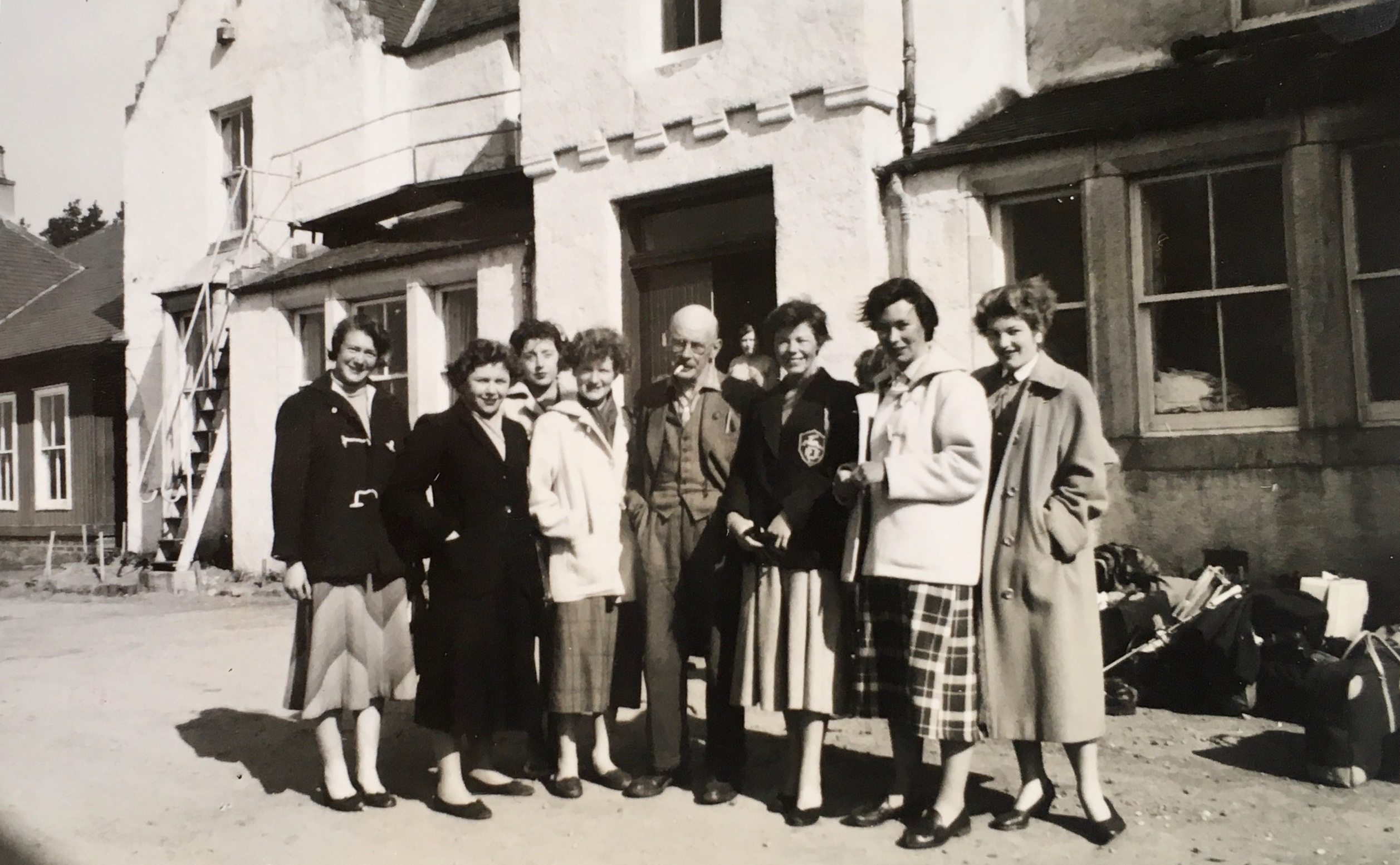
Ben Humble with Dunfermline students, Glenmore Lodge, 1955

Modern dance, education psychology, drama, art and music were added to the curriculum between 1950 and 1960. New games were also introduced including volleyball, badminton and basketball, swimming and athletics rose in prominence, and outdoor recreational sports including skiing, orienteering and golf became increasingly popular. From 1952 onwards students undertook a one-week outdoor education course led by Ben Humble at Glenmore Lodge in the Cairngorms, covering skiing, rock climbing, hillwalking, assailing and canoeing.

In 1956 Helen Drummond retired after holding the post of principal for twenty-five years, she was awarded the Order of the British Empire for services to Physical Education, and replaced as college principal by N. Blunden.

As the college grew it became increasingly difficult to accommodate the students and to provide facilities for games, therefore the college Governors agreed that a new location in Edinburgh should be sought.

=== Edinburgh ===
In 1966 the college moved to a new purpose build campus at Cramond in Edinburgh. The campus was intended to accommodate 80 day students and 200 residential students accommodated in three blocks named after the college's Aberdeen hostels; Queen's, Kepplestone and Rubislaw. The college buildings were designed by Sir Robert Matthew and included a teaching building with library, lecture theatre, science laboratory, art and music studios, tutorial and study rooms, and a gymnasium building with three gymnasia, swimming pool, assembly hall and dance studio. The campus also included outdoor hockey pitches, tennis courts, athletics track, jumping pits and netball courts. In 1987 the college merged with Moray House College of Education; and male students from Jordanhill College in Glasgow also joined the newly merged Scottish Centre for Physical Education, Movement and Leisure Studies (SCOPEMALS) at Moray House. Moray House merged with the University of Edinburgh in 1998 to become the university's School of Education, and in 2001 Cramond campus was closed and the school moved to St Leonards Land, Holyrood. In August 2019, the School of Education formally changed its name to Moray House School of Education and Sport.

== Reputation and culture ==
Since its foundation, Dunfermline College was regarded as a national institution for teacher training, with students of a "distinctly better class in society than the ordinary teacher". Teaching physical education came to be regarded as a respectable career for women, with PE colleges attracting talented sportswomen and nurturing refined manners, poise and deportment. Ethel Adair, principal of the college 1906 - 1907, promoted "the Dunfermline mark" of decorum and respectable social standards. Dunfermline attracted sporting internationalists, as PE teaching was regarded as the occupation of choice at a time when it was difficult to make a living as a sportsperson.

The college operated a "mother and daughter" support system, with new first year students, the daughters, being nurtured by second year mothers. Each year group was known as a set. A commemorative year book was published for each set on the year of their graduation.

=== Uniform ===
Uniform was strictly adhered to, with students being required to wear different uniforms for different sports and subjects. From 1905, for games and dance, students wore a heavy navy pinafore with square velvet yoke and blue cotton blouse, for hockey the tunic was replaced by a grey tweed skirt, hostel wear was a pinafore dress with thin flannel shirt. By the 1950s the navy pinafore had been replaced by a royal blue romper suit which allowed more freedom of movement. Grey shorts and blue Aertex blouses were worn for games, and black leotards and striped skirts for dance. The college cloak was dark green with a purple lining.

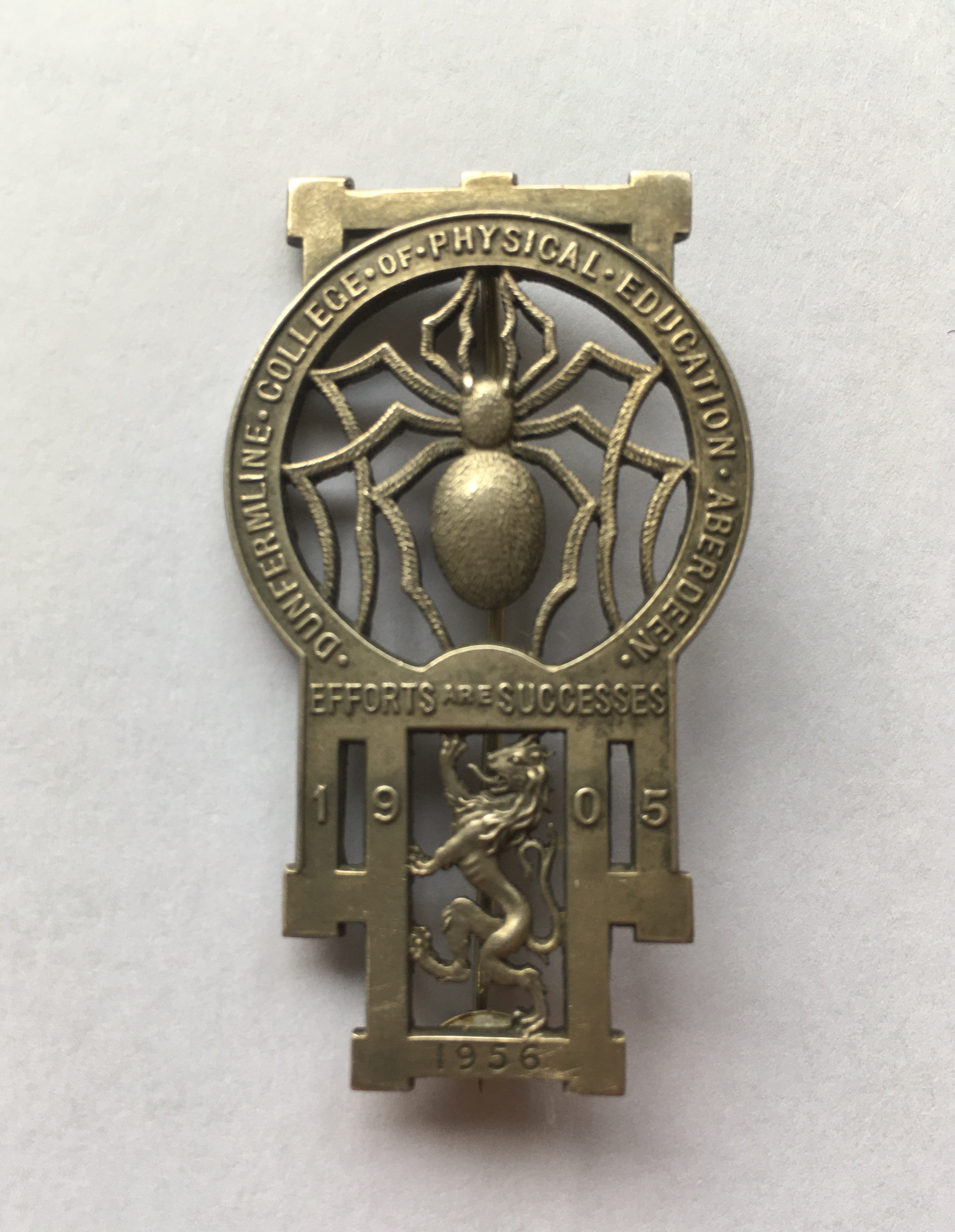
Dunfermline College of Physical Education brooch

The college brooch, awarded to students on graduation, features a spider and a lion rampant and bears the motto "Efforts are Successes" and the founding date of the college. In 1969 the college was granted Armorial Bearings of a shield featuring a tower representing the cities of Dunfermline, Aberdeen and Edinburgh, a leaping stag, representing flight and grace and lightning bolts, which symbolise movement and are also part of the Carnegie family crest.

=== Dunfermline College Old Students' Association ===
Dunfermline College Old Students' Association was founded in 1912 and is still extant. Its aim is to keep members in touch with each other and provide updates on the college and developments in physical education and teacher training. All former students of the college and graduates of the Bachelor of Education degree in PE from the Scottish Centre for Physical Education, Movement and Leisure Studies are eligible to join. The Association publishes an annual report and Set News Magazine, and organises regular reunions.

== Archive ==
Archives of the college are held by the University of Edinburgh's Centre for Research Collections and University of Aberdeen Special Collections. In 2019, Body Language, a Wellcome Trust funded archive exhibition at University of Edinburgh Library explored the archives of Dunfermline College of Physical Education, Scottish Gymnastics, and choreographer and dance teacher Margaret Morris.

== Gallery ==
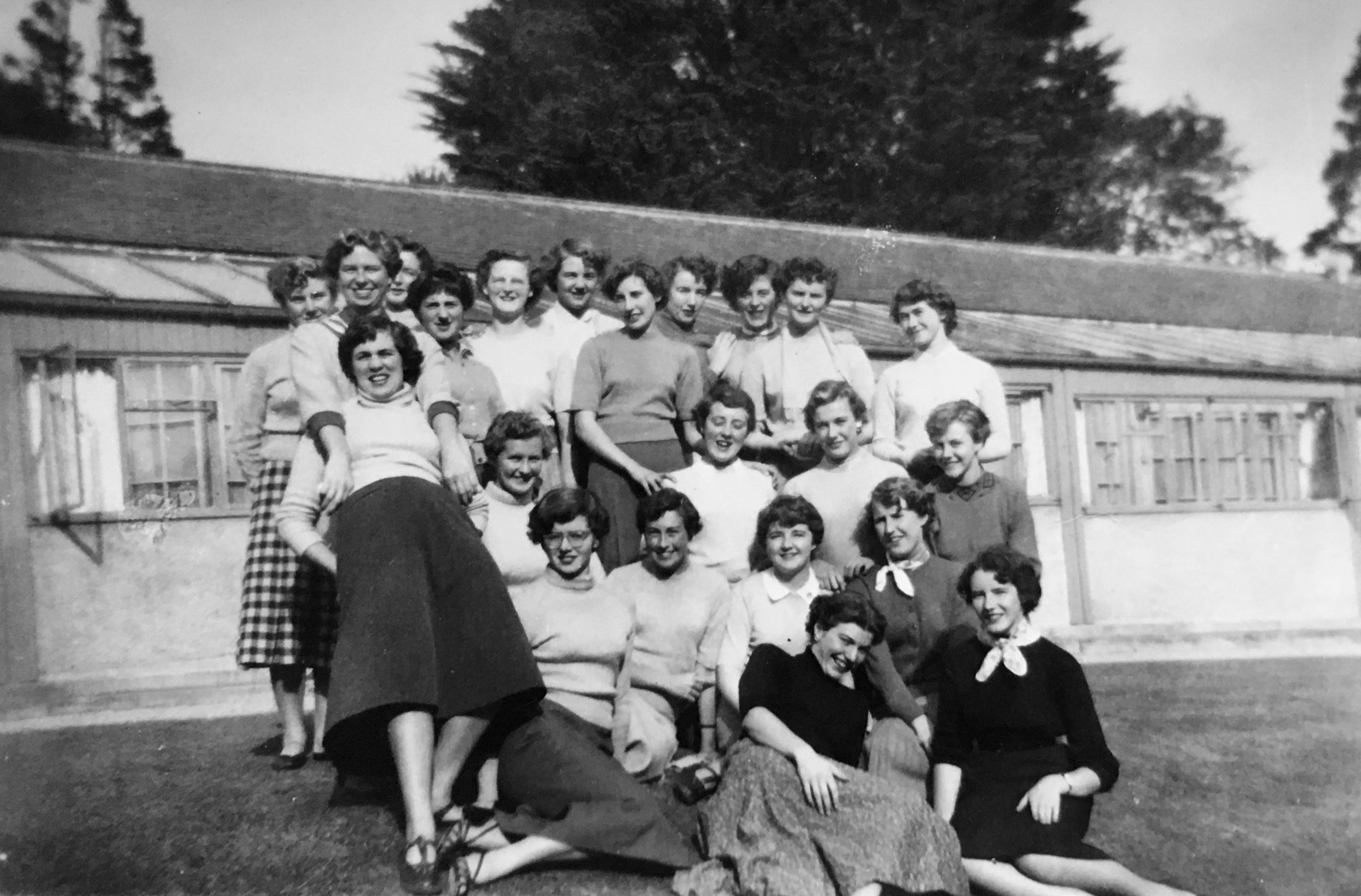
Dunfermline College of Physical Education students, 1955

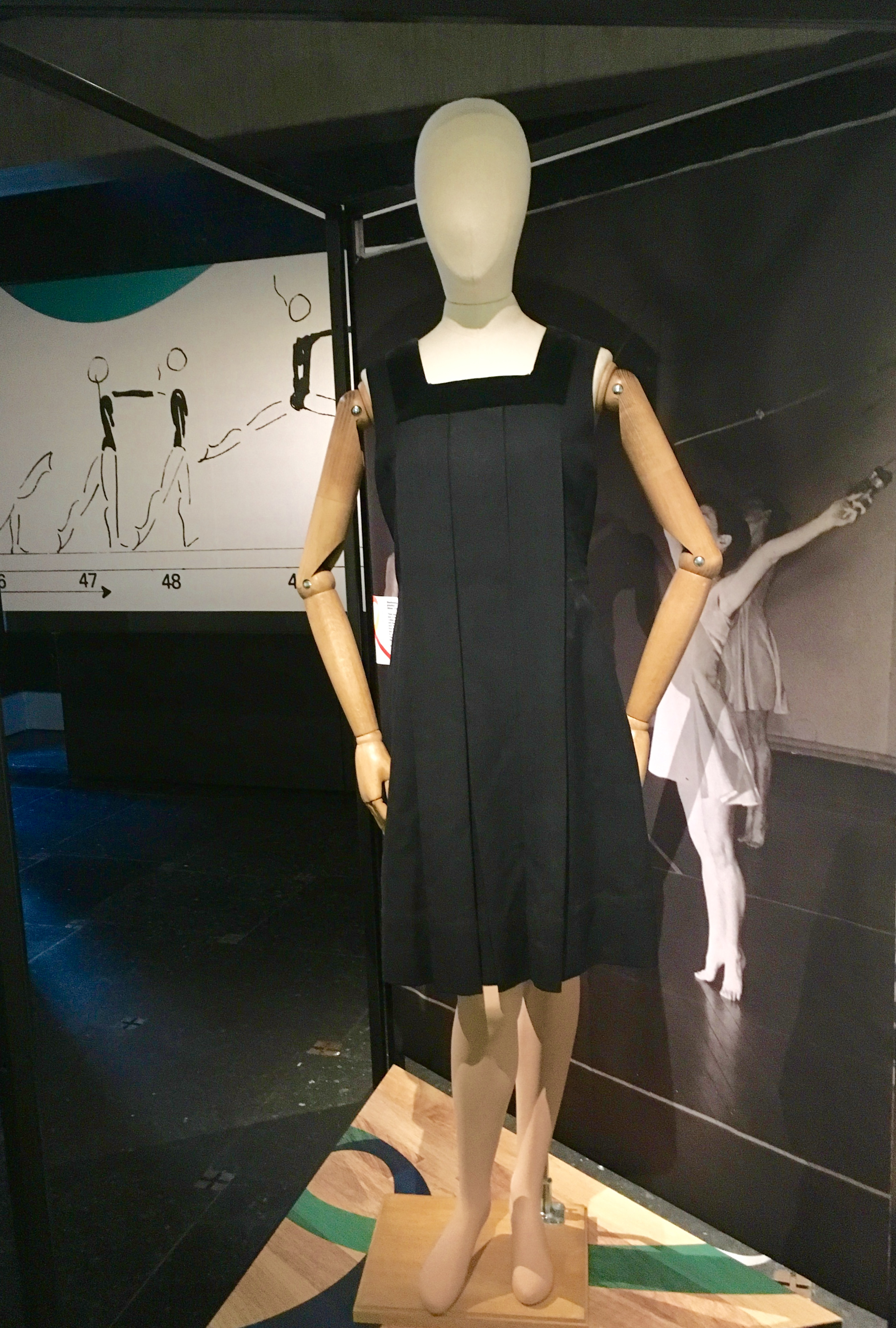
Navy woollen pinafore with velvet yoke, worn by students of Dunfermline College of Physical Education c. 1910 - 1920. Body Language exhibition, University of Edinburgh Library, 2019.

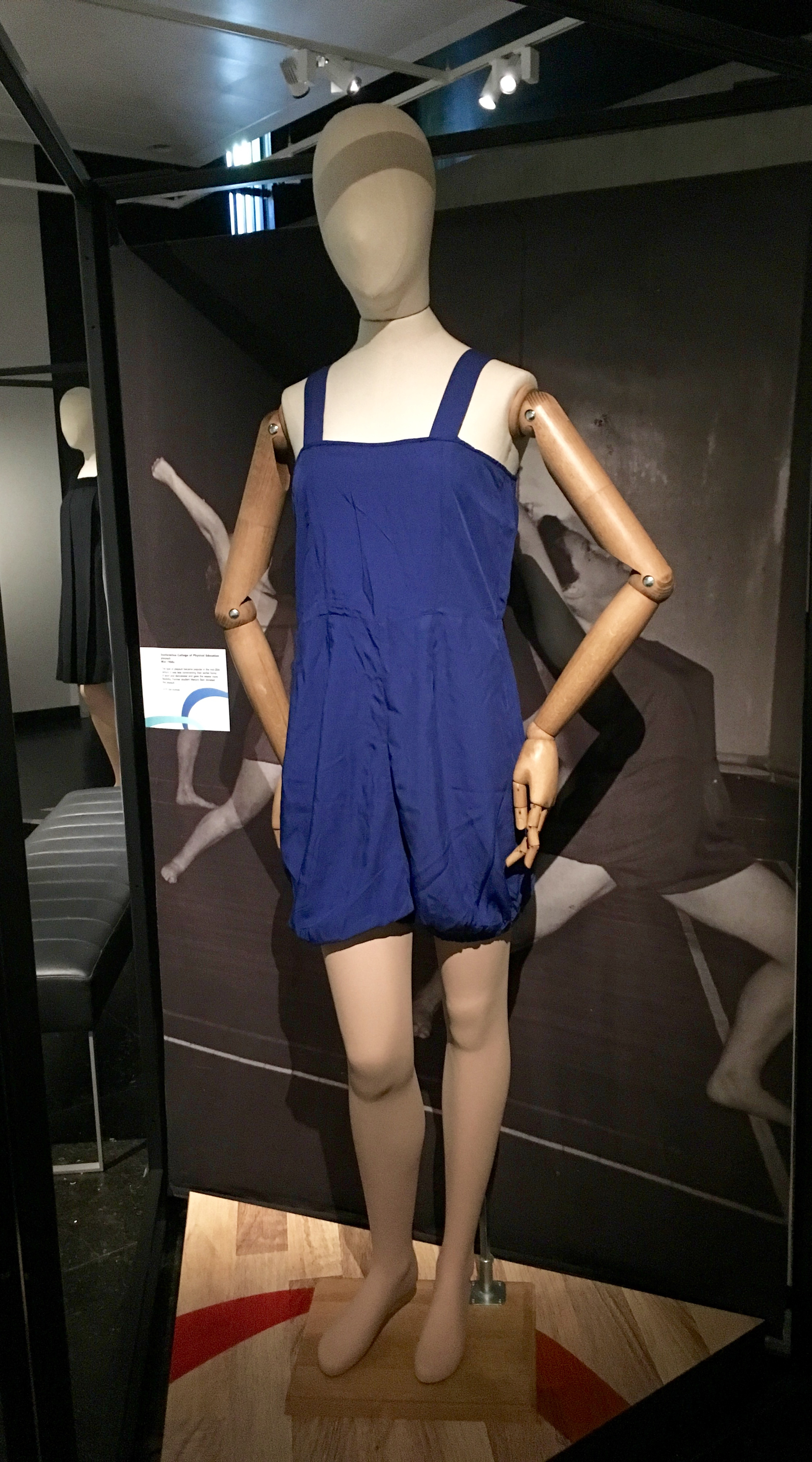
Romper suit worn by students of Dunfermline College of Physical Education during the 1950s. Body Language exhibition, University of Edinburgh Library, 2019.

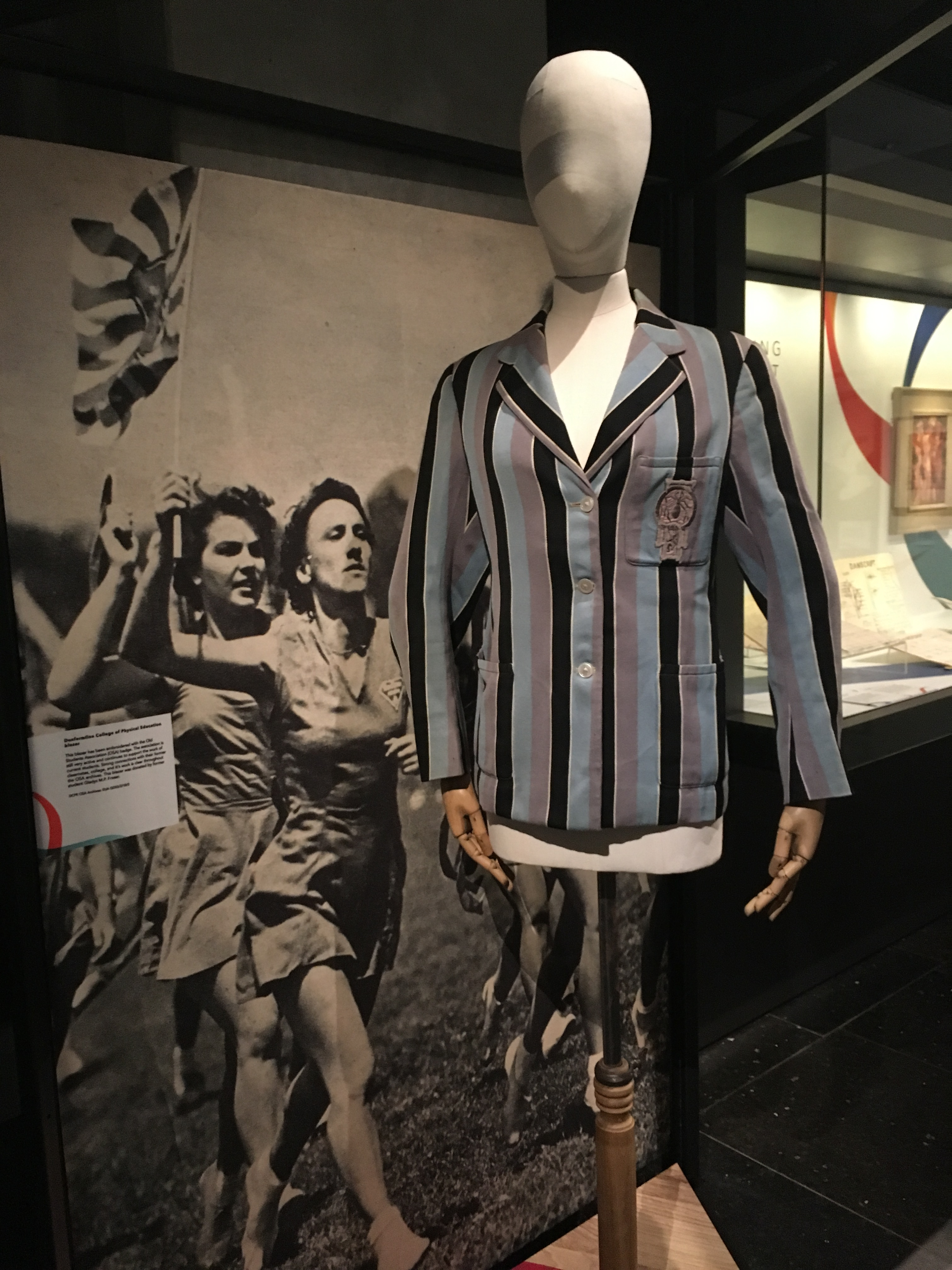
Dunfermline College of Physical Education blazer, embroidered with the Old Students Association badge. Body Language exhibition, University of Edinburgh Library, 2019.

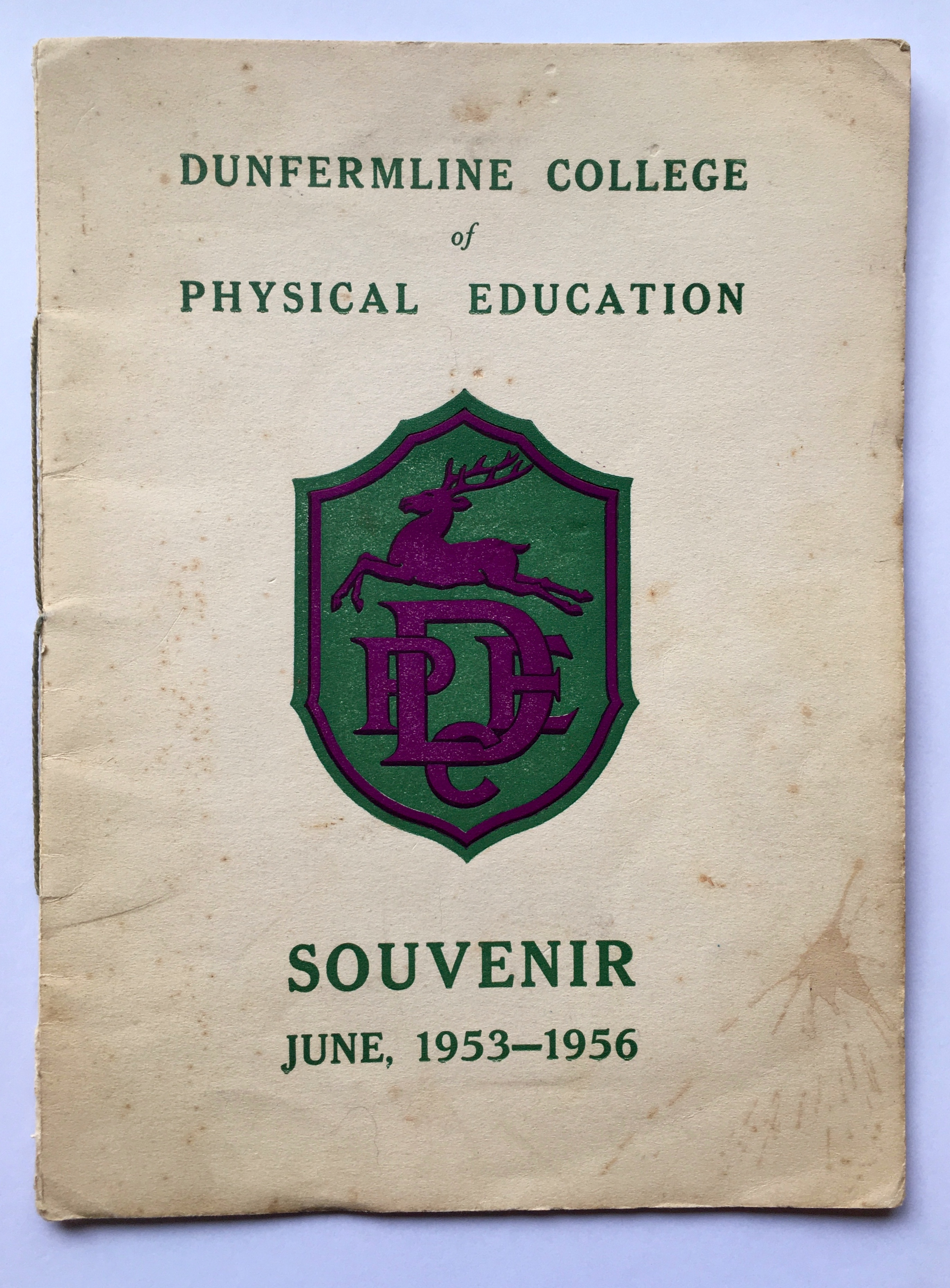
Dunfermline College of Physical Education Graduation Year Book, 1953 - 1956

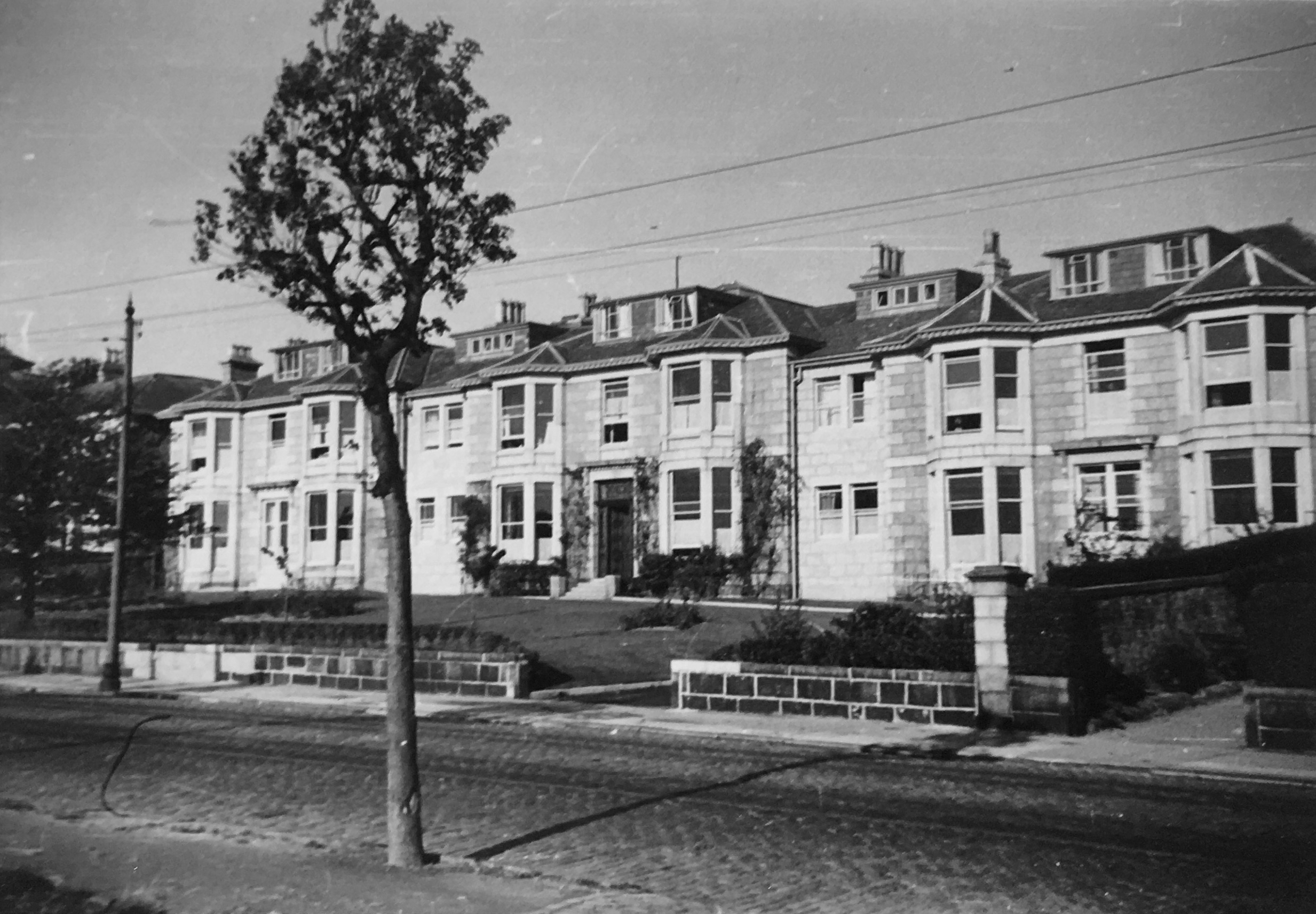
Queen's Road hostel, Aberdeen

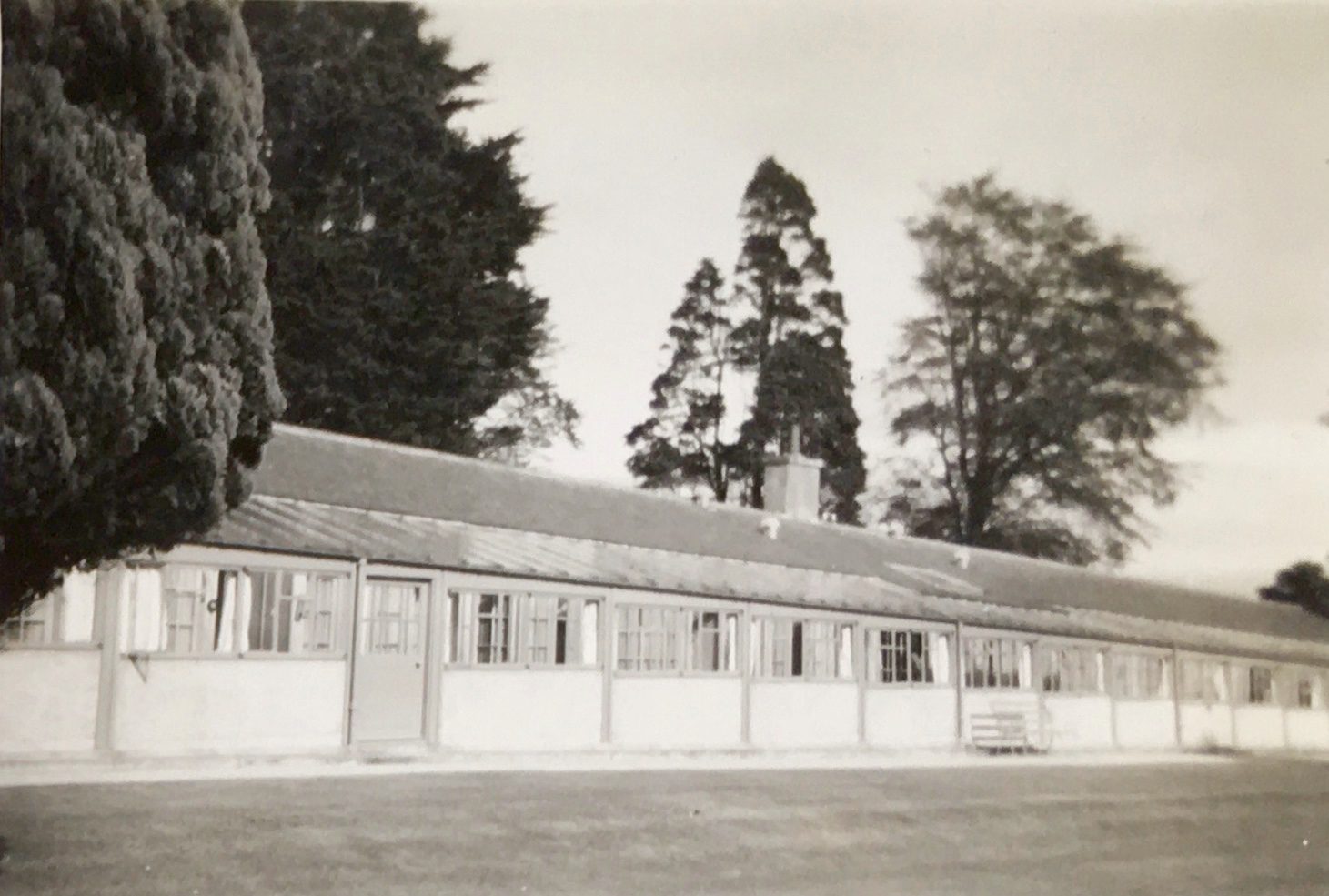
"Sunshine Alley", Dunfermline College of Physical Education, Aberdeen

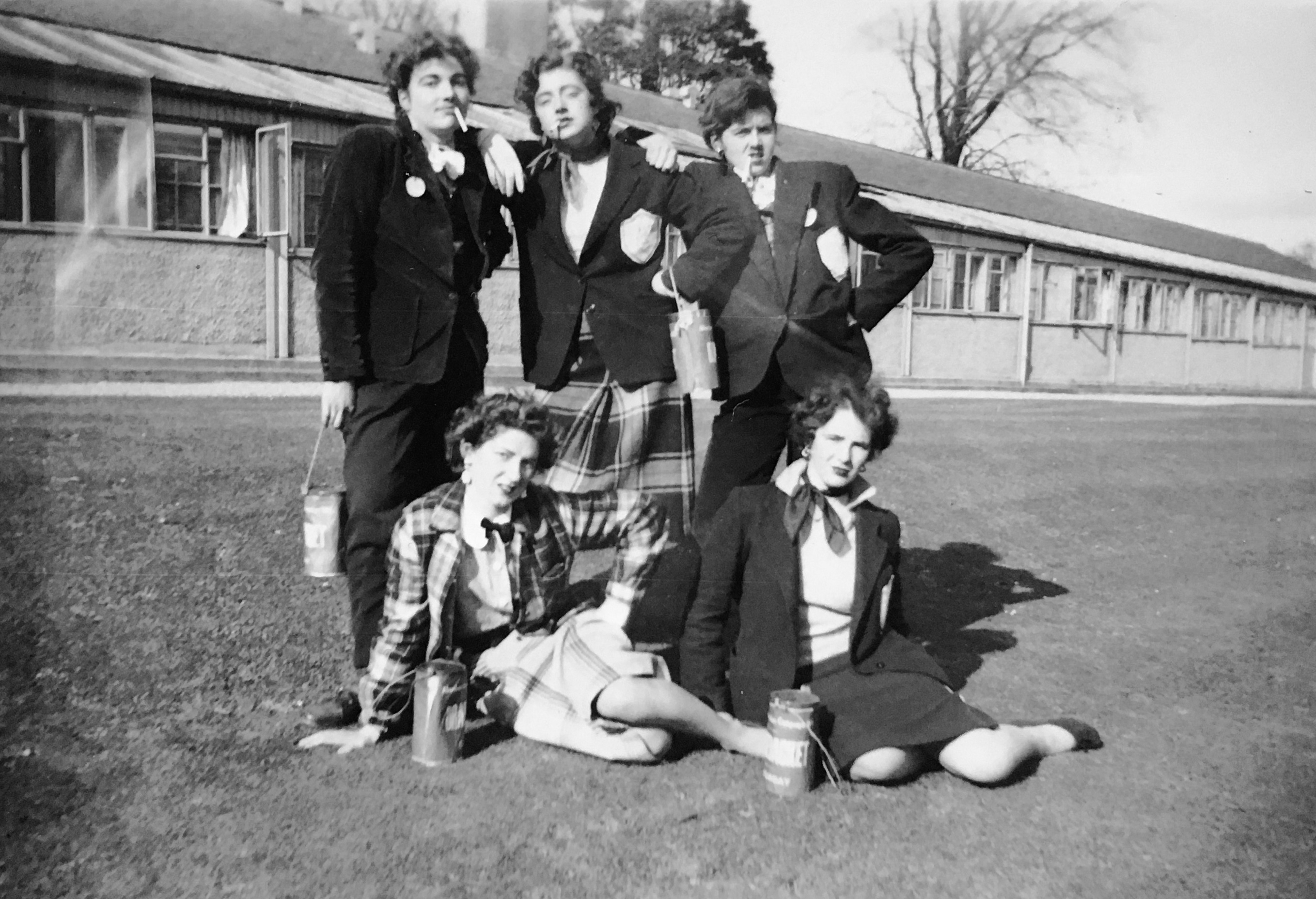
Dunfermline College of Physical Education Charities Week 1955

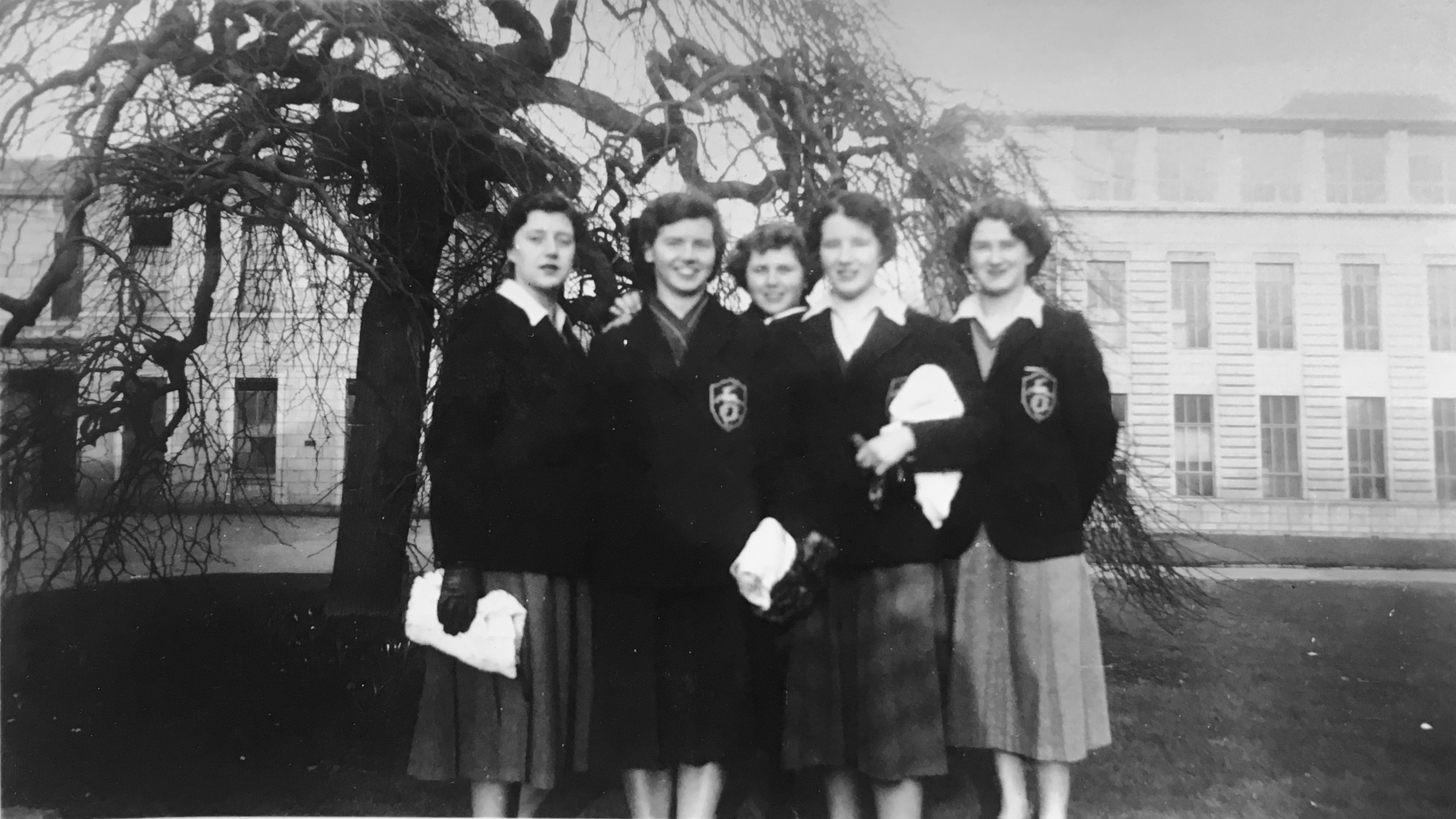
Dunfermline College of Physical Education students, Gordon's Baths, Aberdeen, 1955

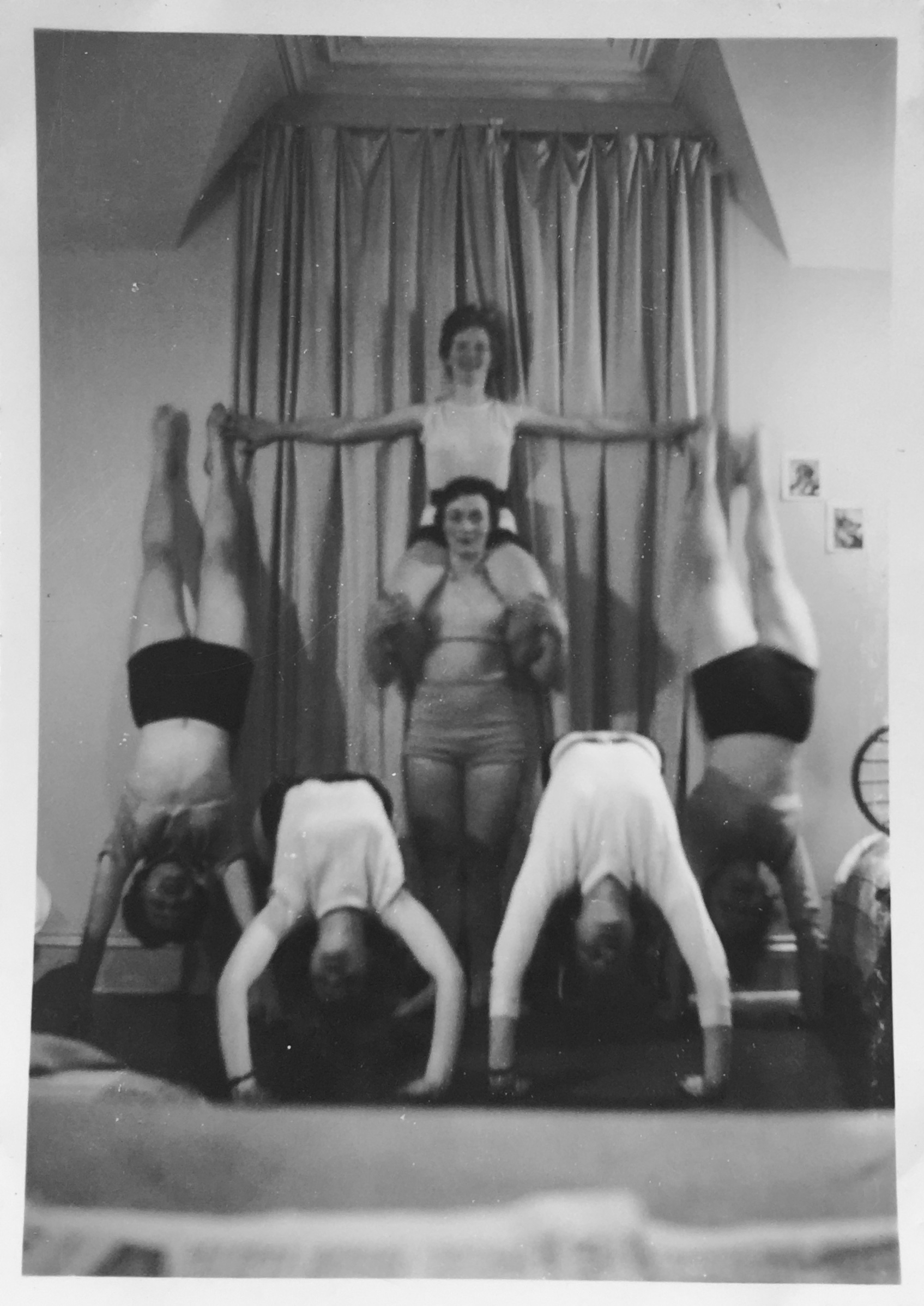
Dunfermline College of Physical Education students, Aberdeen, 1955

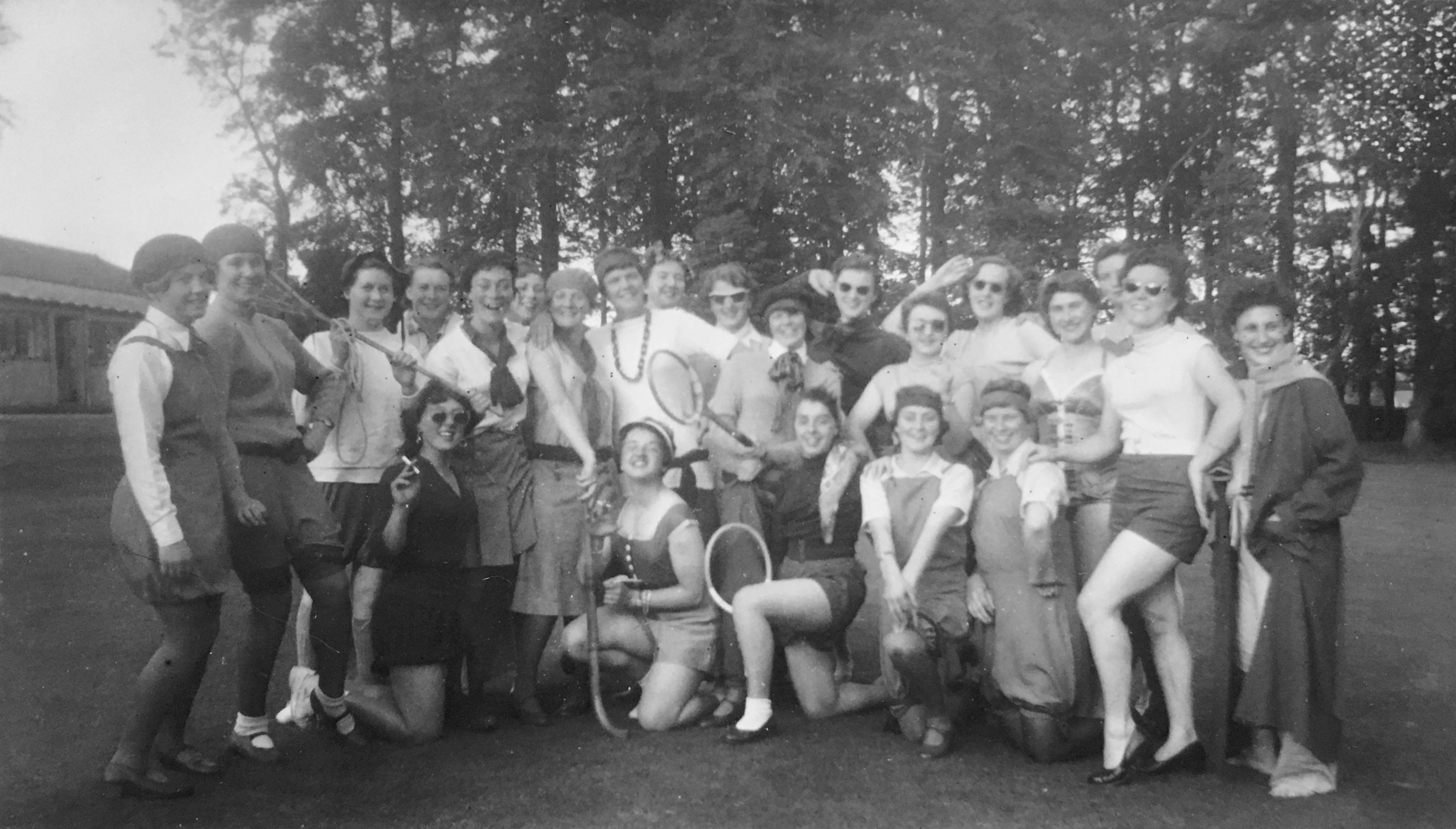
Dunfermline College of Physical Education Charities Week 1955

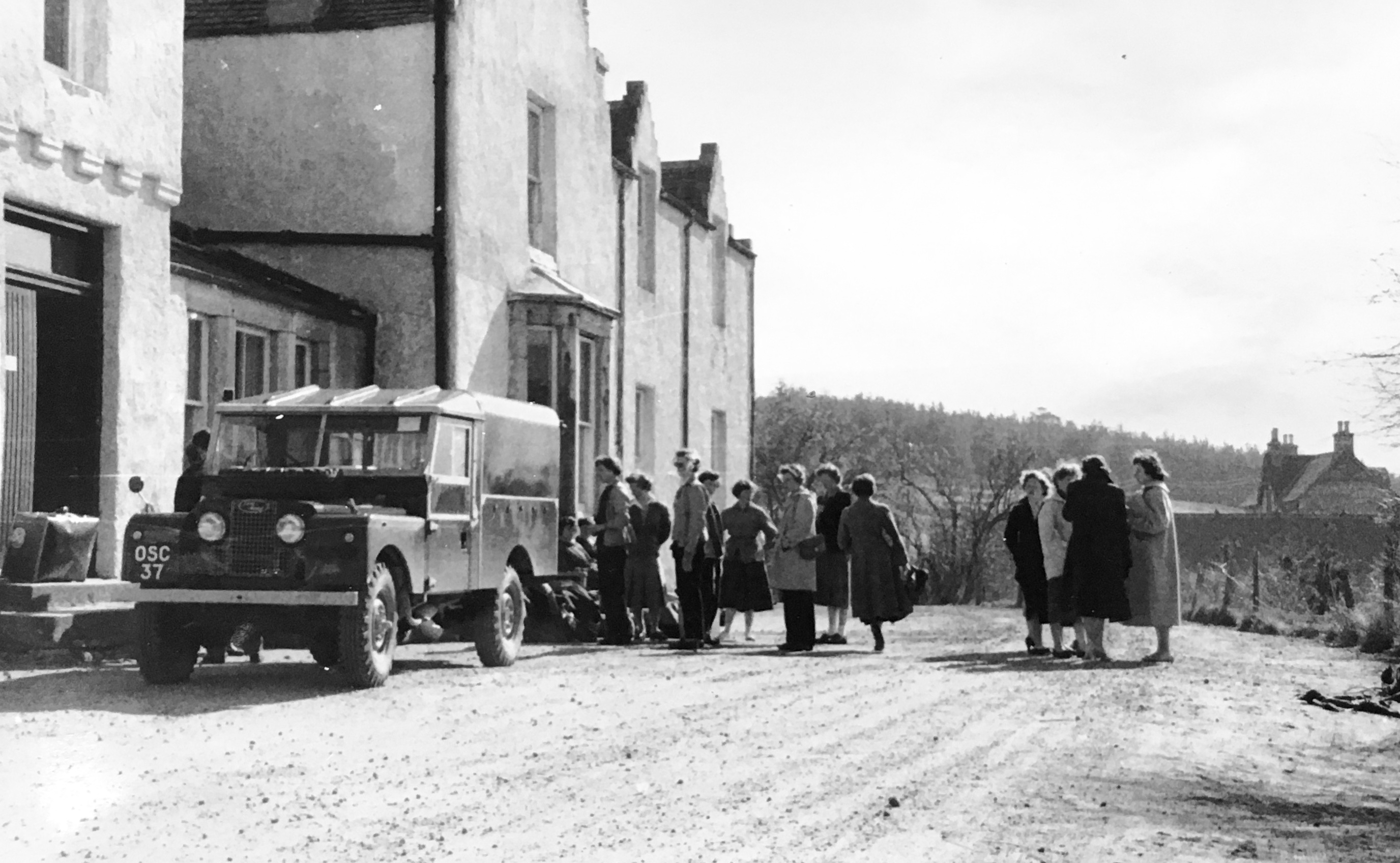
Dunfermline College of Physical Education students at Glenmore Lodge, 1955

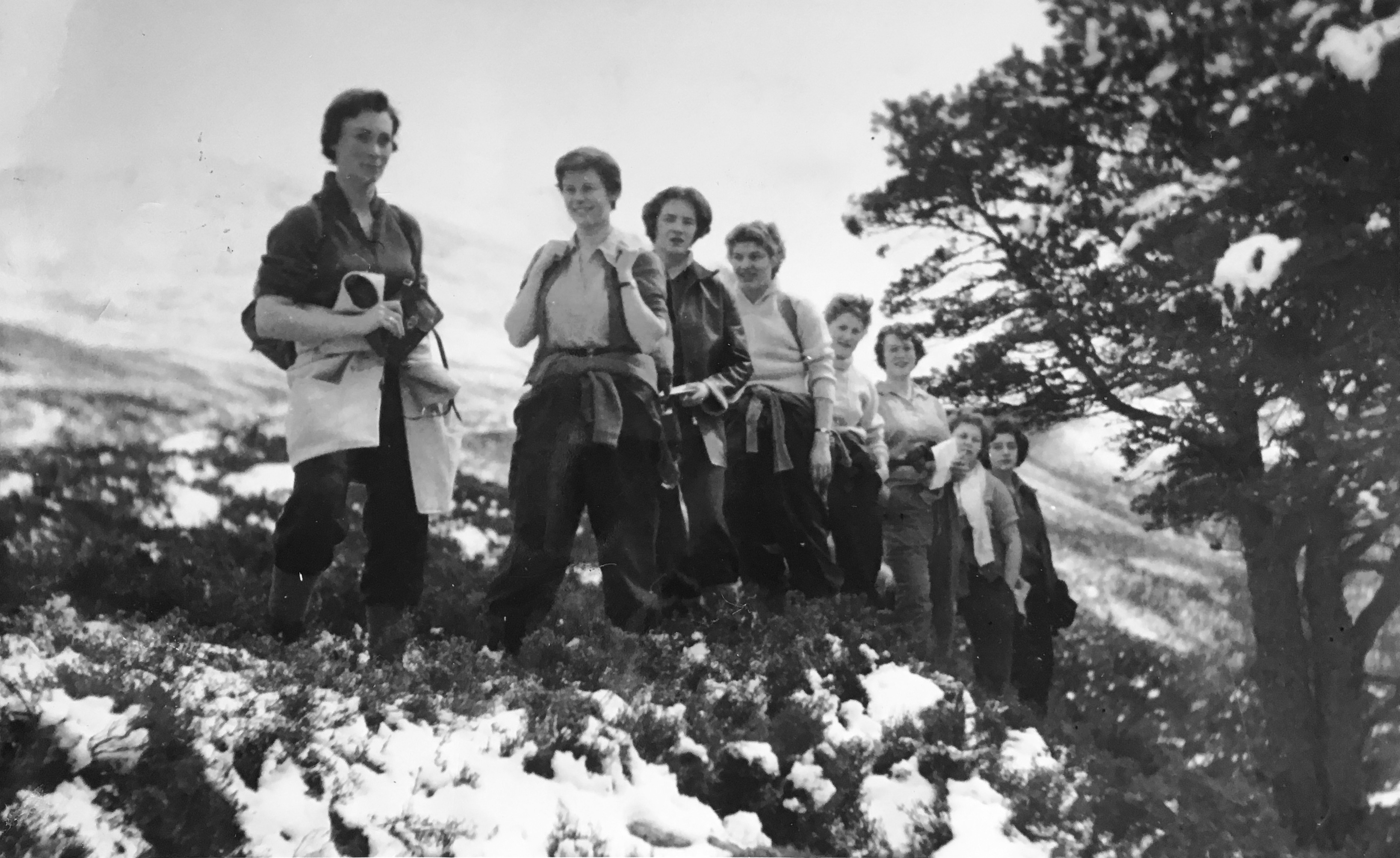
Dunfermline College of Physical Education students, Cairngorms, 1955

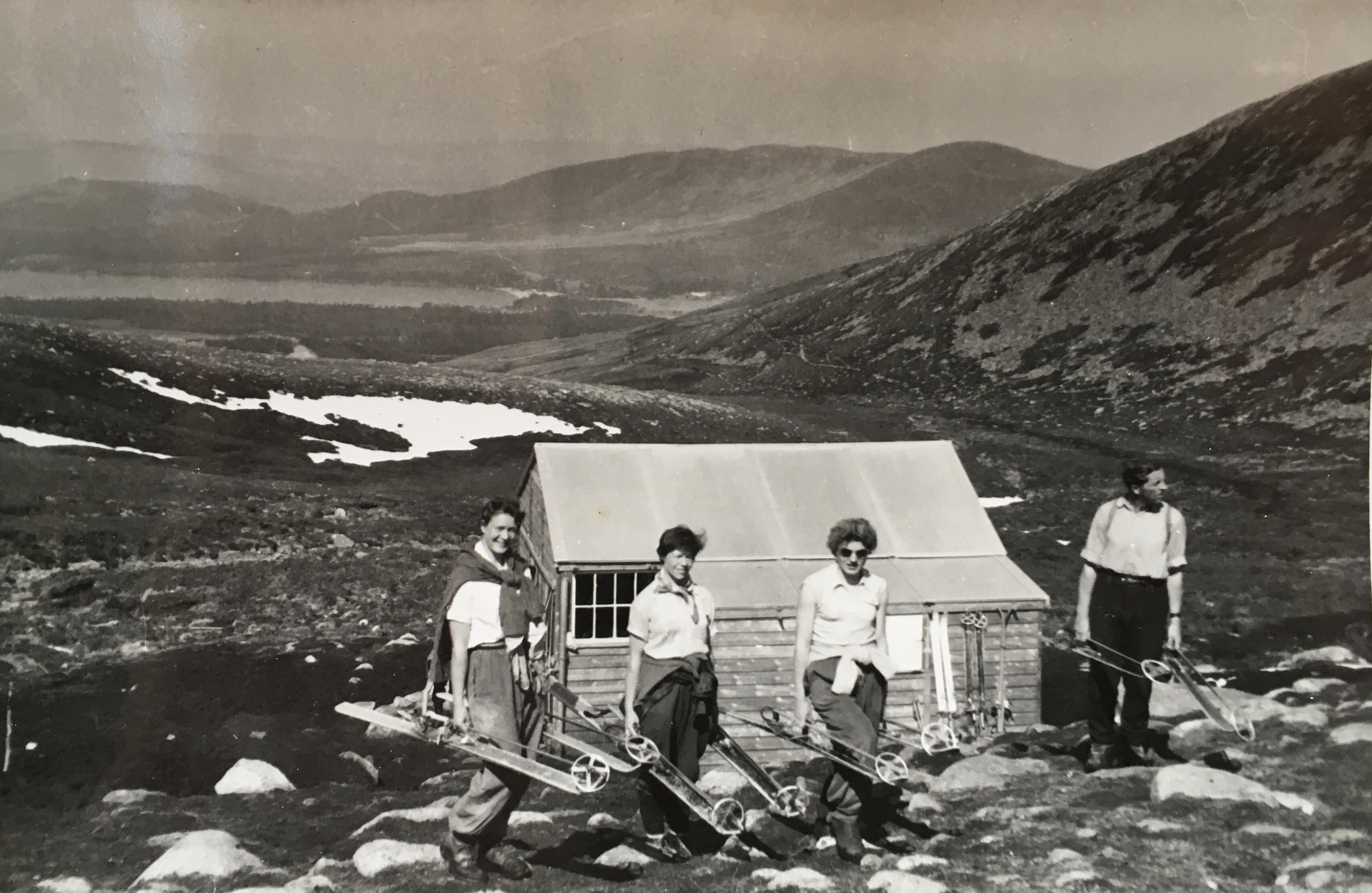
Dunfermline College of Physical Education students, Cairngorms

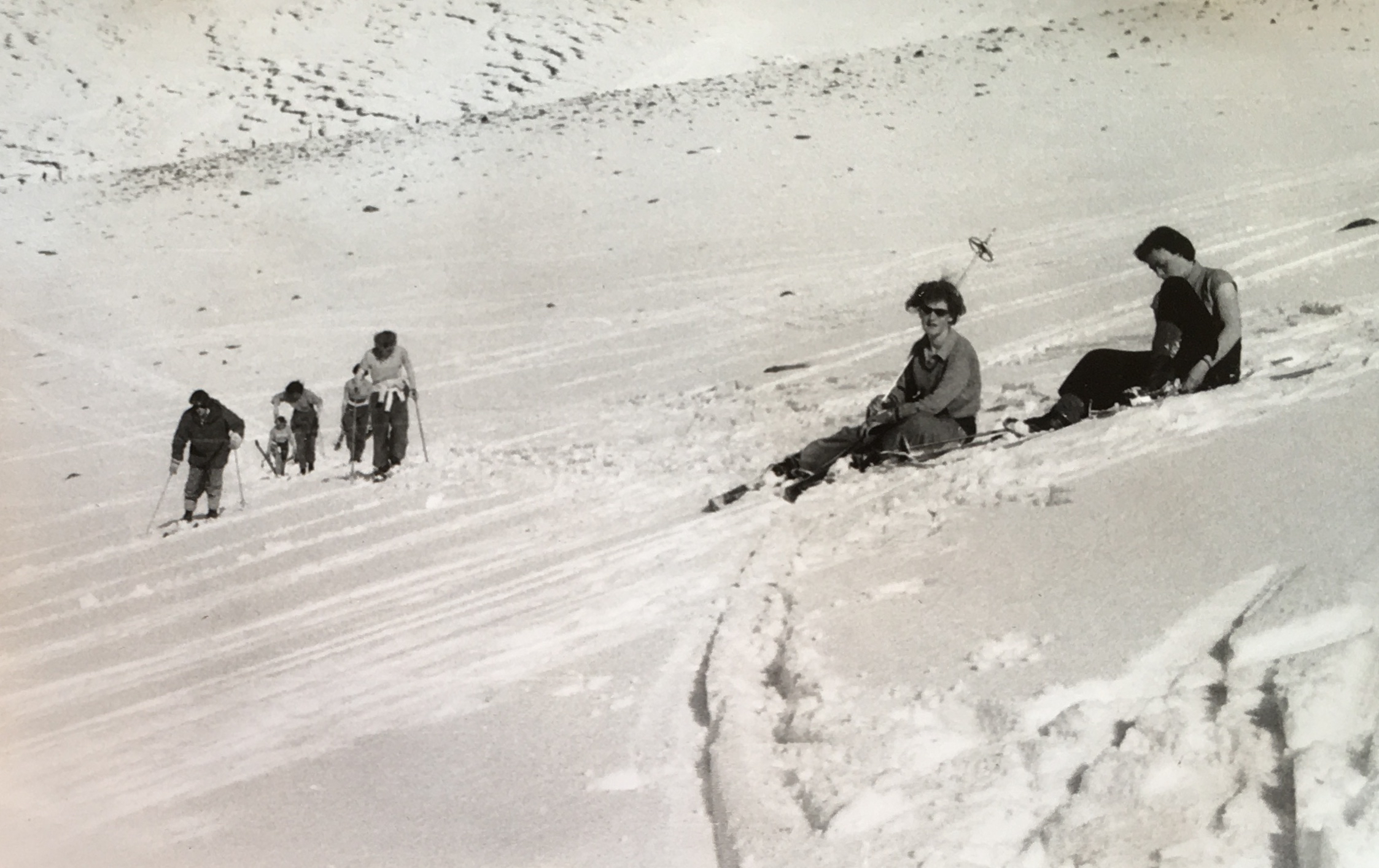
Dunfermline College of Physical Education students skiing in the Cairngorms, 1955

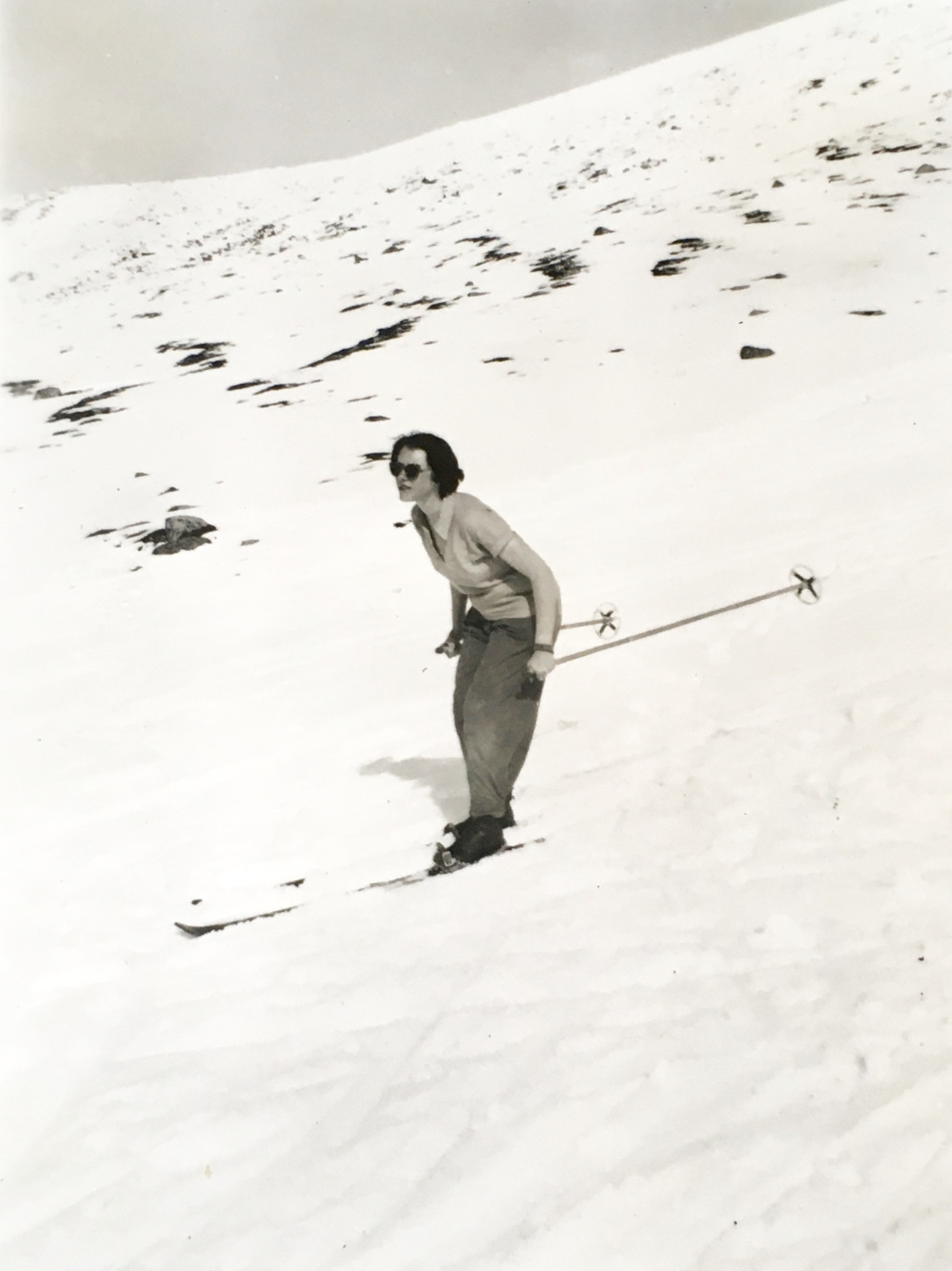
Dunfermline student skiing in the Cairngorms

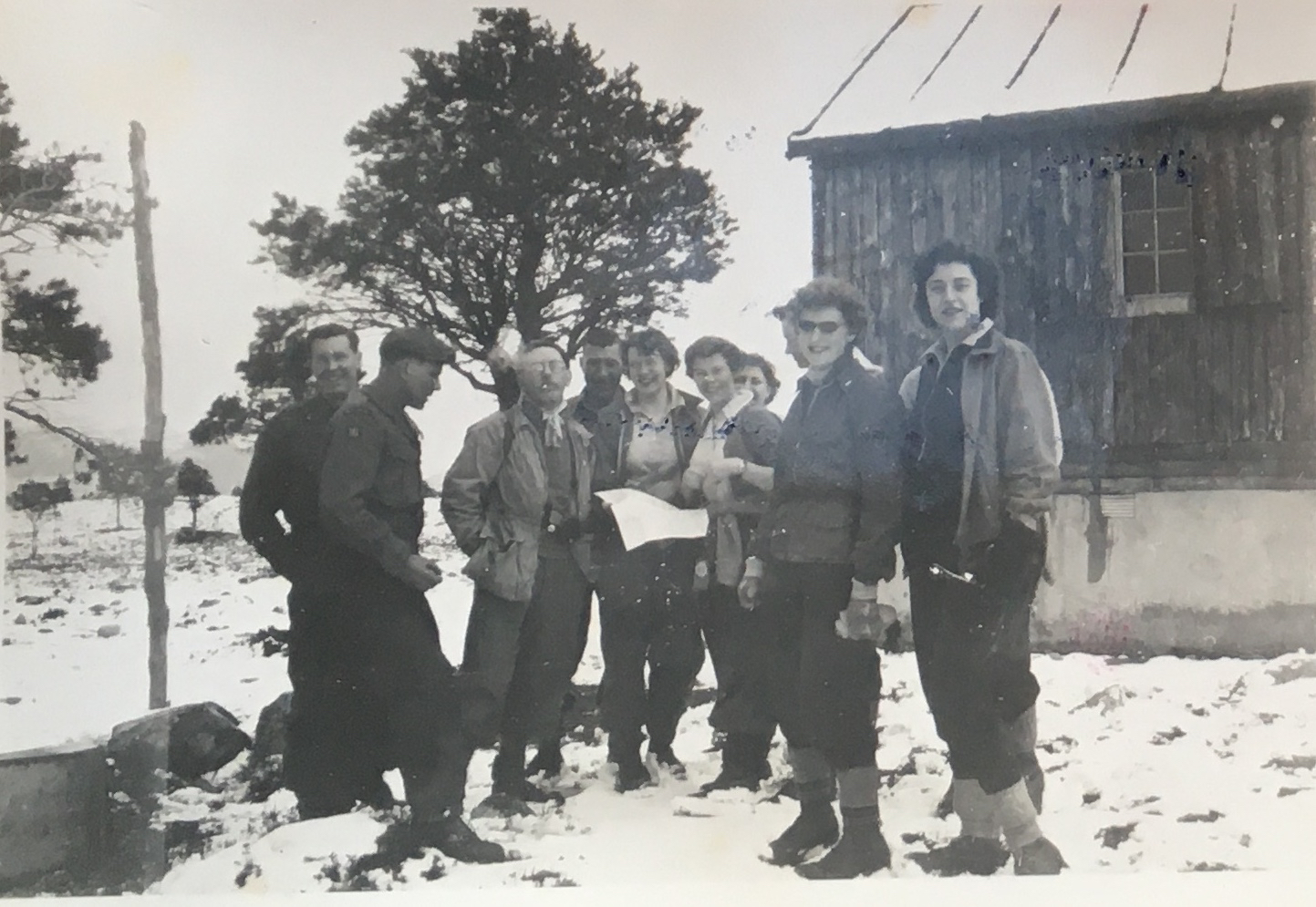
Dunfermline College of Physical Education students with Ben Humble, Cairngorms, 1955

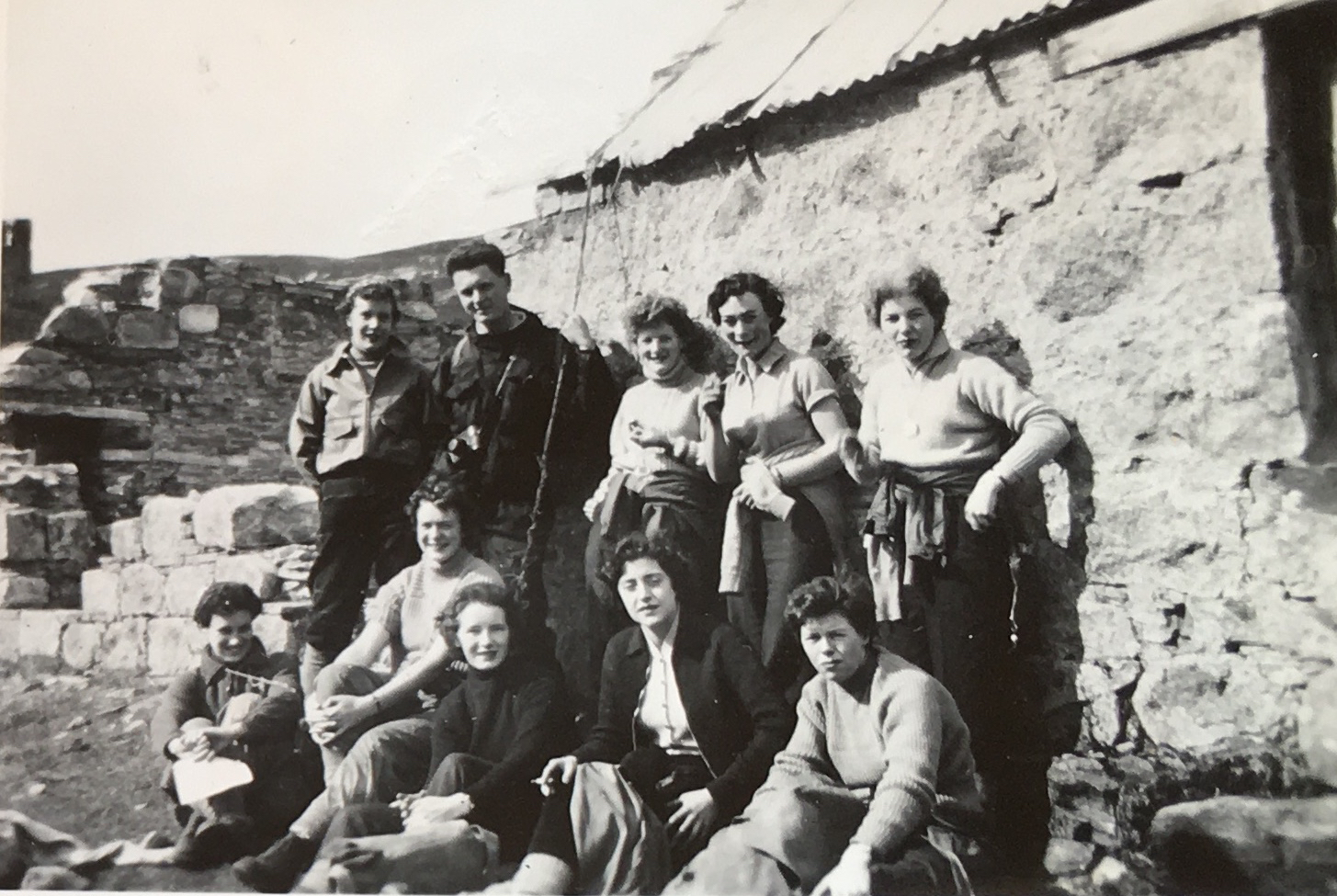
Dunfermline College of Physical Education students at Ryvoan bothy, Cairngorms, 1955

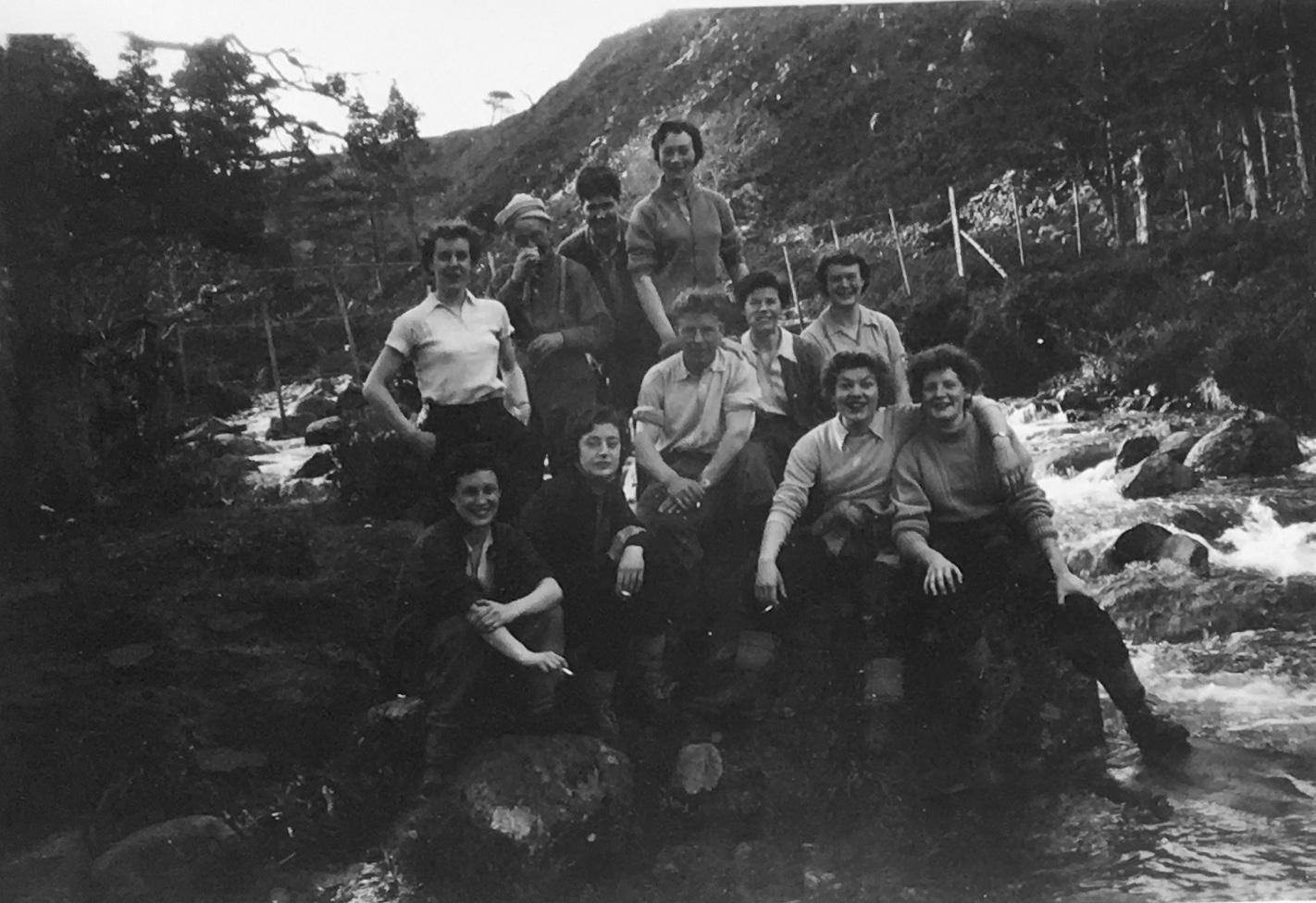
Dunfermline College of Physical Education students, Cairngorms, 1955

== College principals ==
- 1905–1906 Miss Flora M. Ogston
- 1906–1907 Miss Ethel Adair Roberts
- 1908–1910 Miss Mary Stewart Tait
- 1910–1911 Miss M.L. Brailsford (Interim principal)
- 1912–1931 Dr A.T. Mackenzie
- 1931–1956 Miss Helen Drummond
- 1956–1970 Miss N. Blunden
- 1970 Miss Mollie Abbott

== Notable alumni ==
- Peter Hoffmann, athlete and author
- Margo MacDonald, Scottish politician
