= Leila Rendel =

Leila Rendel OBE
- Rendel in 1964
- Born: Leila Margaret Rendel; 11 October 1882; Kensington, London, UK
- Died: 16 March 1969 (aged 86); Ashford, Kent, UK
- Occupations: social worker; educator
- Relatives: Robert Rendel (brother); Alexander Rendel (grandfather); Kegan Paul (grandfather); Eden Paul (uncle); Mary Stocks (cousin)

Leila Rendel OBE (11 October 1882 – 16 March 1969) was an English social worker, suffragist, and children's campaigner. She was the co-founder of the Caldecott Community, a pioneering boarding school in Kent for distressed and vulnerable children, and served as its director for over 50 years.

== Life and career ==
Rendel was born in London to an upper-middle-class family active in liberal and radical causes. Her father, William Stuart Rendel, was a civil engineer. He was the son of Alexander Meadows Rendel and the nephew of Stuart Rendel. Her mother, Ruth Frances née Paul, was the daughter of the publisher Kegan Paul. Leila was the eldest of three siblings. Her sister, Olive, became an obstetrician and later wrote a book on the use of exercise in the post-war rehabilitation of children. Her brother, Robert, became a stage and film actor.

Rendel left school at 15 after which she was educated by a governess and later attended a school in Wimbledon run by the French feminist Marie Souvestre. After her father's death in 1898, Rendel spent most of her early adult life at the Bloomsbury home of her grandfather, Alexander Rendel. During that period she developed close relationships with her aunt, Edith Rendel, and her cousin, Mary Stocks, both of whom were active suffragists and social reformers.

Rendel initially trained as teacher of physical education at Chelsea College of Physical Training from 1902 to 1904. In 1905 she was appointed to the teaching staff of the newly established Dunfermline College of Hygiene and Physical Training, and in 1908 was the first woman to be appointed an inspector of physical training by the Board of Education. However, from her early 20s, she had also developed a keen interest in nursery education and the ideas of the nursery education pioneer Margaret McMillan. Her interest was further spurred in 1908 when her aunt Edith opened a large day nursery in the St Pancras district of London. In her spare time Rendel and her friend Phyllis Potter began running a nursery class in Whitefield's Tabernacle on Tottenham Court Road.

In 1911, Rendel and Potter decided to set up their own nursery school based on the progressive ideas of McMillan and Edith Rendel. It was located at Cartwright Gardens in St Pancras and mainly catered to the children of women working in a nearby matchbox factory. An admirer of Randolph Caldecott's children's book illustrations, she named the school The Caldecott Community and adorned its walls with Caldecott's pictures. Rendel's grandfather, Alexander, provided them with an endowment and further donations were received from her large circle of family and friends. By 1914 the school was well-established with a written constitution and the Professor of Education at the University of London as its chairman. Princess Louise served as its president.

The condemnation of the St Pancras building by the local council in 1917 and the continued German bombing of London led the Caldecott Community to move with its teachers and children to Maidstone. In the process it became the first co-educational boarding school in the UK for working-class children. Over the course of the next 20 years, the school increasingly took in distressed and vulnerable children whose family lives had been disrupted by death, illness, and divorce. The school moved several more times before finding a permanent home on 1947 in Mersham-le-Hatch, a large house surrounded by parkland located near Ashford in Kent. That same year with a grant from the Nuffield Trust, Rendel set up the first experimental reception centre in England to assess the most appropriate placement for children who had been taken into care. She was awarded an OBE for her work in the 1948 New Year Honours.

In 1967, Rendel began retiring from active directorship of the Caldecott Community but remained active in the school's life. She died two years later at the age of 86 while undergoing surgery after a fall at her house on the grounds of the school. According to her biographer, Simon Rodway, she had suffered a broken hip in the fall and while lying on the floor and waiting for the ambulance, she insisted on reading the latest book on child care.
