= Ben Humble =

British mountain climber

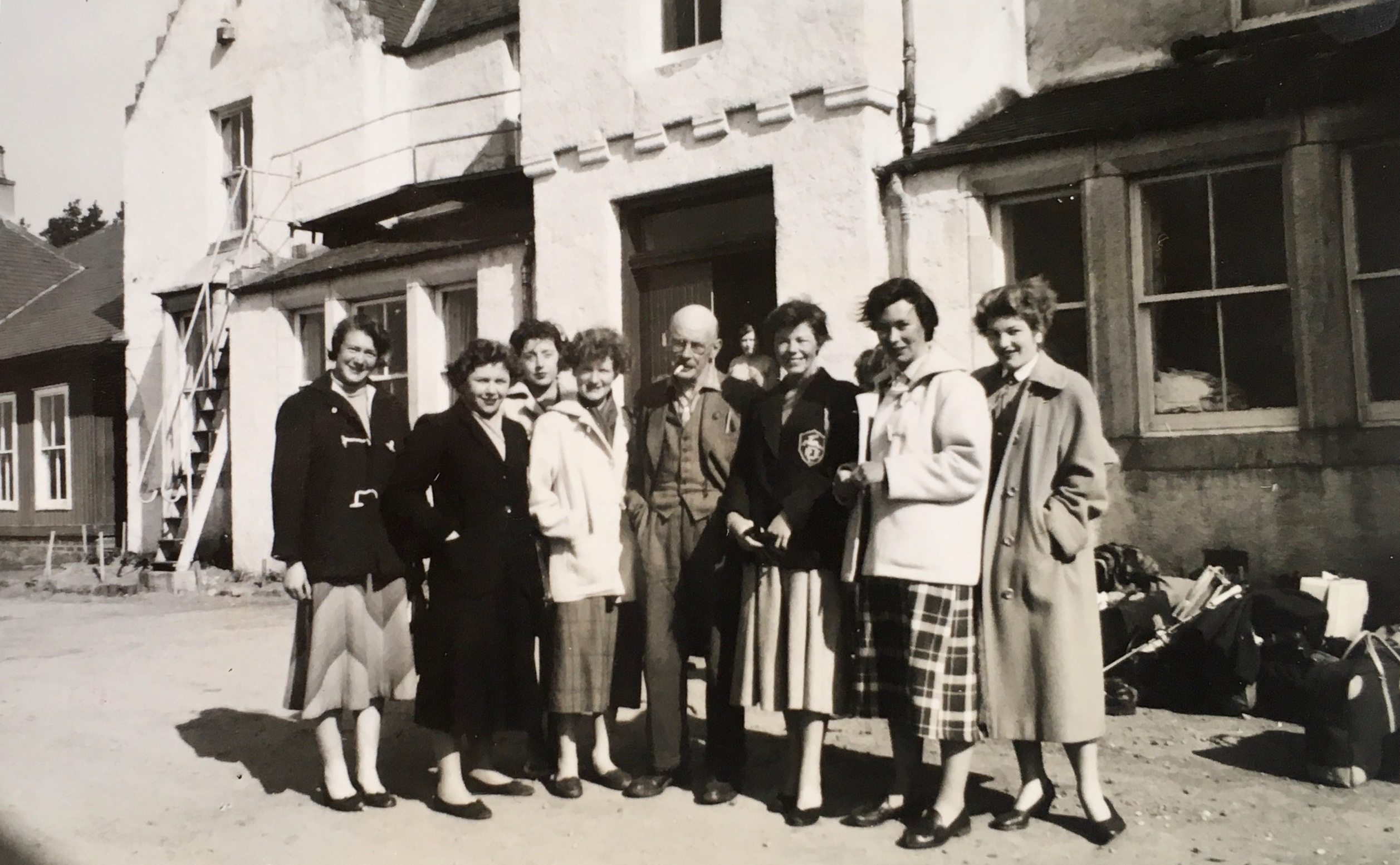
Ben Humble with students of Dunfermline College of Physical Education, Glenmore Lodge, 1955

Benjamin Hutchison Humble MBE (1903–1977) was a Scottish writer and climber who was responsible for the creation of Scottish Mountain Rescue teams as we know them today. He was also a keen photographer and film maker. During the World War II he produced several educational films in order to support the war effort.

Humble was born in Dumbarton in 1903, one of the sons of the manager of Dennystown Forge. Despite his total deafness he became a dentist, later making advances in forensic dentistry.

A biography of his life, The Voice of the Hills: The Story of Ben Humble was written by his nephew Roy Humble in 1995.

== Works ==
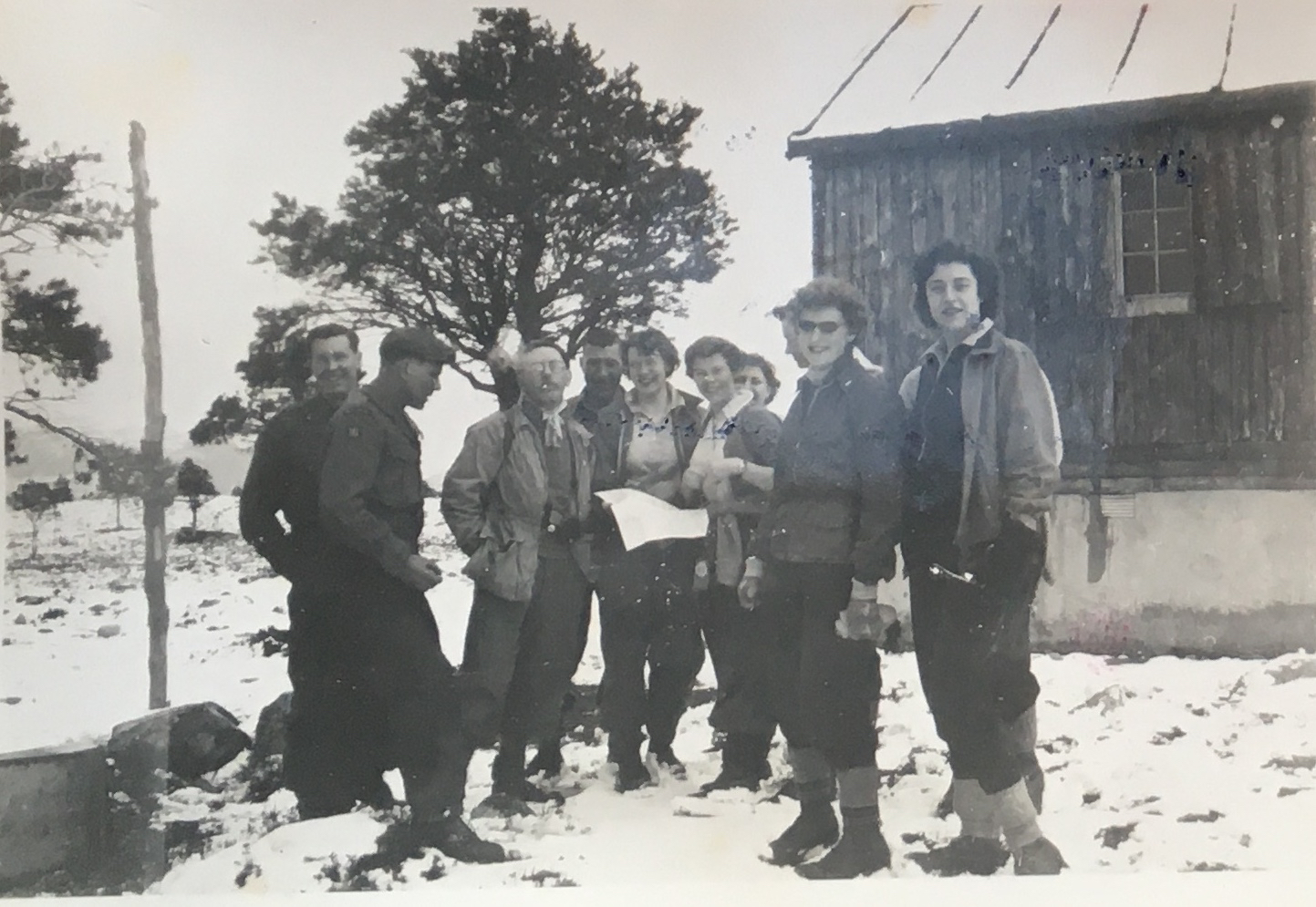
Ben Humble with students of Dunfermline College of Physical Education, Cairngorms, 1955

=== Books ===
- Arrochar and District: A Complete Guide (1930)
- Tramping in Skye (1933)
- The Songs of Skye (1934)
- Wayfaring Around Scotland (1936)
- Songs For Climbers (1938), a collection of climbing songs put together by Humble and his publisher W.M.McLellan
- Rock Climbs on the Cobbler (1940), written with the assistance of J.B.Nimlin and G.C.Williams
- On Scottish Hills (1946)
- The Cuillin of Skye (1952)
- Rock Climbs at Arrochar (1954), written with the assistance of J.B.Nimlin.

=== Films ===
- A Bomb Fell (1941)
- A Cragsman's Day (1946)
- Holidays in Arrochar (1949)
