= Caldecott Foundation =

UK charity

- Named after: Randolph Caldecott
- Formation: 13 September 1946
- Founder: Leila Rendel
- Type: Private company limited by guarantee
- Legal status: Registered charity
- Purpose: Therapeutic care and education of disadvantaged and vulnerable children
- Headquarters: Caldecott House
- Location: Smeeth, Kent, UK
- Managing Director: Nicholas Barnett
- Chairman of Trustees: Charles Lister OBE
- Website: thecaldecottfoundation.co.uk
- Formerly called: Caldecott Community

The Caldecott Foundation, formerly known as the Caldecott Community, is a UK charity which provides therapeutic care and education for disadvantaged and vulnerable children. It has been based in the Borough of Ashford in Kent since 1947 and operates seven registered children's homes in Kent and Nottinghamshire as well the Caldecott Foundation School.

The foundation's roots go back to 1911, when Leila Rendel founded a day nursery in the St Pancras district of London which catered to the children of women working in a nearby factory. It later evolved into a pioneering boarding school in Kent, first for working class children, and then for distressed and vulnerable children who had been placed into care. Rendel named the community after the children's book illustrator Randolph Caldecott whose pictures adorned the walls of the St Pancras nursery.

The foundation was officially incorporated in 1946 as the Caldecott Community. Its name was changed to the Caldecott Foundation in 1997.

== History as the Caldecott Community ==
The Caldecott Comminuty began its life in 1911 when Leila Rendel and her friend Phyllis Potter set up their own nursery school based on the progressive ideas of Margaret McMillan and Leila's aunt Edith Rendel who was an active critic of the English Poor Laws, a pioneer girls' club leader and a militant suffragist. Their school was located at Cartwright Gardens in St Pancras and mainly catered to the children of women working in a nearby matchbox factory. An admirer of Randolph Caldecott's children's book illustrations, Rendel named the nursery school in his honour and adorned its walls with a frieze of his pictures. Rendel's grandfather, Alexander Meadows Rendel, provided them with an endowment and further donations were received from her large circle of family and friends. By 1914 the school was well-established with a written constitution and Percy Nunn as its chairman. Princess Louise served as its president.

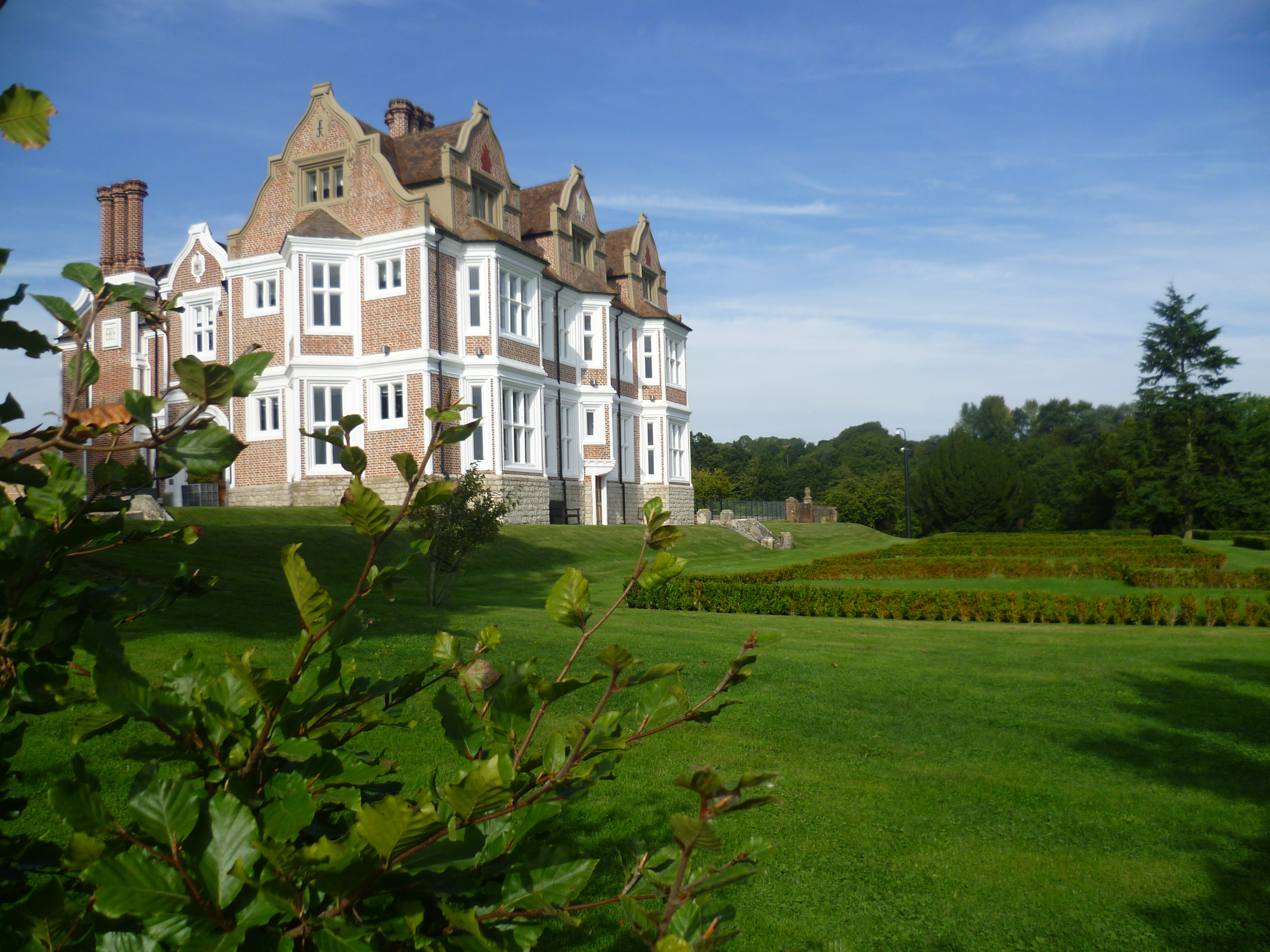
Charlton Court in East Sutton, Caldecott's home from 1917 to 1924

The continued German bombing of London and subsequent condemnation of the St Pancras building by the local council in 1917 led the Caldecott Community to move with its teachers and children to Charlton Court, a large country house near Maidstone. In the process it became the first co-educational boarding school in the UK for working-class children. When the lease on Charlton Court expired in 1924, the school moved to another country house in Goffs Oak, a village in Hertfordshire and remained there for the next eight years. During its time there the community increasingly took in distressed and vulnerable children whose family lives had been disrupted by death, illness, and divorce.

The school moved back to the Maidstone area in 1932 where it occupied Mote House. The World War II bombing of Maidstone led to the community moving to Hyde Heath in Dorset in 1941 where they remained for the duration of the war. Lord Lytton served as chairman of the school's trustees. During that period 100 boys and girls, including 15 Jewish refugees, were living in the community. They ranged in age from 1 to 16. At the time, only children up to the age of 11 were educated within the community itself. The older boys and girls went to local secondary schools. Over the years, ten Caldecott pupils were sent to Gordonstoun School on scholarships. Leila Rendel was a life-long friend of Kurt Hahn, Gordonstoun's founder, and was a founding trustee of the school.

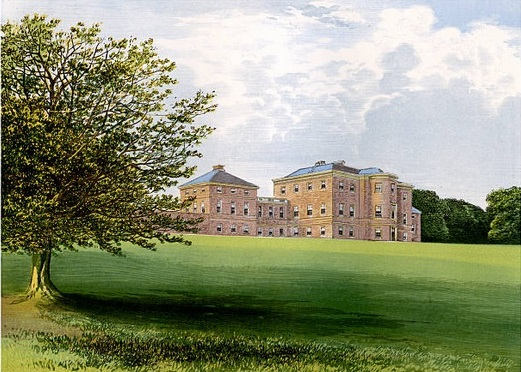
Mersham-le-Hatch in Mersham, Caldecott's home from 1947 to 2000

In 1947 the community moved to Mersham-le-Hatch, a large country house designed by Robert Adam surrounded by parkland. Located near Ashford in Kent, it had served as a military hospital during World War II. That same year with a grant from the Nuffield Trust, Rendel set up the first experimental reception centre in England to assess the most appropriate placement for children who had been taken into care. Mersham would remain Caldecott's home for over five decades. Its owner, Lord Brabourne became a long-time supporter of the community and served on its board of governors for over 40 years. Leila Rendel retired from active directorship of the community in 1967 and died two years later at the age of 86. James King succeeded her as the director and served in that post until his retirement in 1993. Like Rendel, he was awarded an OBE for his work with the community. During his tenure he reorganised the community's structure and set up smaller family units for the residential care of the children and young people in its care.

== Caldecott Foundation ==
With the impending expiry of the lease on Mersham-le-Hatch in the late 1990s, the community's organization underwent further structural changes, and in 1997 changed its name to the Caldecott Foundation. An £8m appeal was launched to fund the future accommodation and expansion of Caldecott. In 2000, the foundation's new headquarters were opened at Caldecott House, a large Victorian residence in Smeeth. Several residential homes were constructed on its grounds as well as a purpose-built school nearby which opened in 2000.

The foundation launched another appeal in 2011, its centenary year. The appeal raised £750,000 which was used to upgrade the foundation's supported accommodation and to set up two vocational training centers.

As of 2021, the Foundation's services include therapeutic residential care, education both through tutoring and small classes in their residential care homes or at the Caldecott School, and therapeutic fostering placements. Caldecott Fostering moved onto the Ashford site in 2020. The Foundation is governed by a board of trustees whose chairman is Charles Lister OBE. Nick Barnett was appointed as managing director in March 2017.

== Caldecott Foundation School ==
The Caldecott Foundation School is an independent special school located on Station Road in Ashford, Kent near the foundation's headquarters. It provides educational services and integrated therapy for children in the residential care of the foundation and delivers the National Curriculum for Key Stage 2 through Key Stage 4. The school has a sixth form and also provides vocational training in a number of areas. The vocational training includes an off-site training center for motor vehicle mechanics which is also open to pupils from other schools. As of 2017, 27 children and young people were enrolled in the school. The pupils range in age from 7 to 18 and are all eligible for pupil premium funding from the UK government. Many of them had been previously excluded from other care or educational settings because of their social, emotional and behavioural problems. According to the school's 2017 Ofsted inspection report, all pupils in the previous three years who left the school at the end of Year 11 or from the sixth form went on to further education, training or employment.
