= Yelford =

Coordinates: 51.739°N 1.481°W

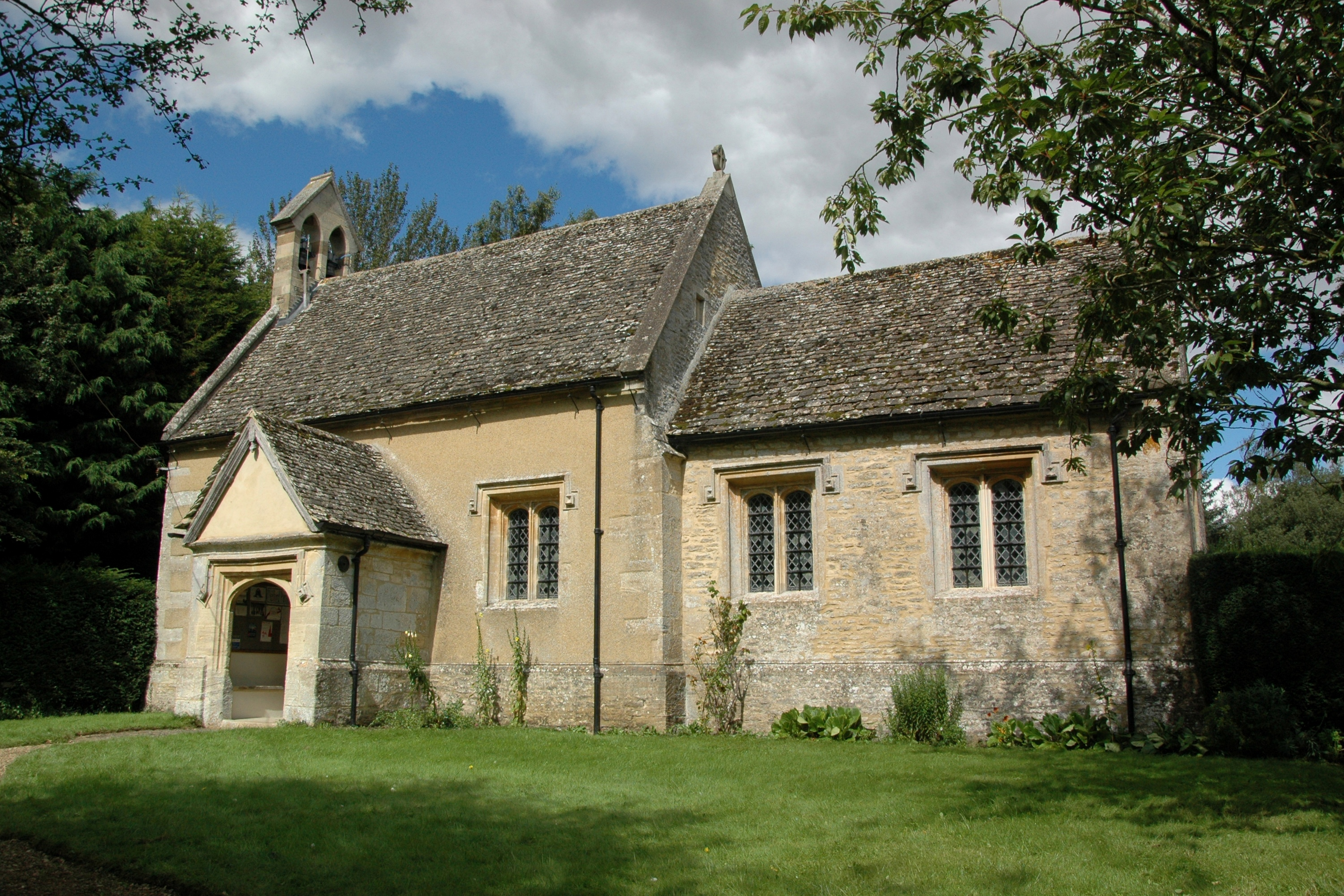
- Parish church of St Nicholas & St Swithun, Yelford

- Location within Oxfordshire
- OS grid reference: SP3504
- Civil parish: Hardwick-with-Yelford
- District: West Oxfordshire
- Shire county: Oxfordshire
- Region: South East
- Country: England
- Sovereign state: United Kingdom
- Post town: Witney
- Postcode district: OX29
- Dialling code: 01993
- Police: Thames Valley
- Fire: Oxfordshire
- Ambulance: South Central
- UK Parliament: Witney

Yelford is a small village in the civil parish of Hardwick-with-Yelford, in the West Oxfordshire district of Oxfordshire, England. It lies about 3 miles (5 km) south of Witney.

== History ==
Evidence of ancient humans has been found in the area. A mid-Acheulian hand axe was discovered in 1963 beside the north wall of the church cottage. It was dated by the Ashmolean Museum to around 130,000 years ago and then gifted to the Oxfordshire Museum.

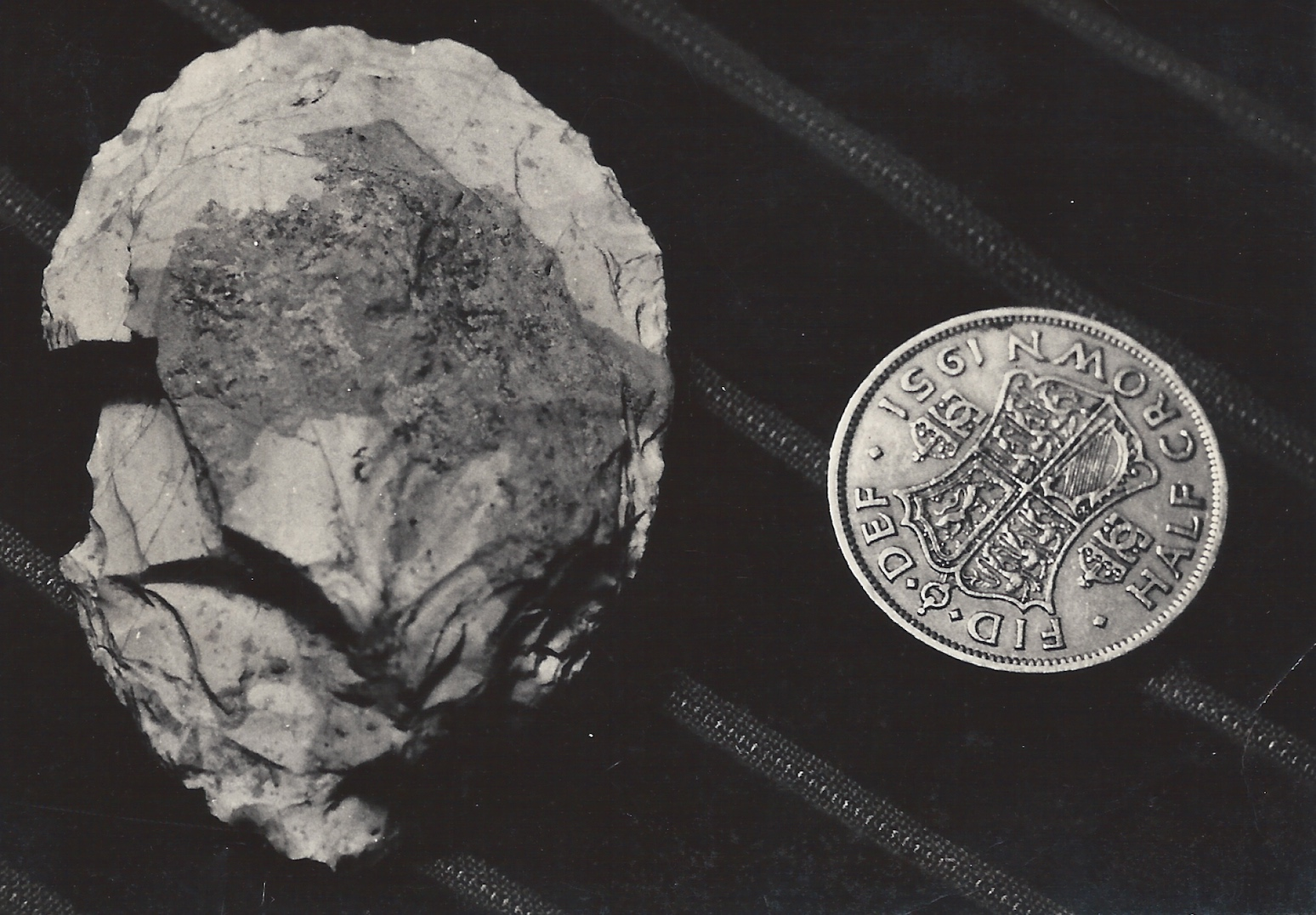
Mid-Acheulian Hand Axe, discovered in Yelford, 1963

Romano-British pottery has been found in two locations at Yelford. There is also an Anglo-Saxon burial ground between the Yelford to Hardwick road and Westfield Farm.

In 1086 the Domesday Book records that Walter of Ponz held the manor of Yelford. Walter's other manors included Eaton Hastings, and together his manors were sometimes called the honour of Hastings.

By 1221 the lord of the manor was Philip of Hastings. Around this time the manor of Yelford also became a parish, having previously been part of the extensive parish of Bampton. The Hastings family had built a chapel adjoining their manor house by 1221, when they claimed the advowson of the new parish. There were disputes with Bampton over whether Yelford should still be considered a chapelry of Bampton, and about the boundaries of Yelford parish. These resulted in Yelford having to pay an annual pension to Bampton, which continued to be paid into the 19th century.

== Manor ==
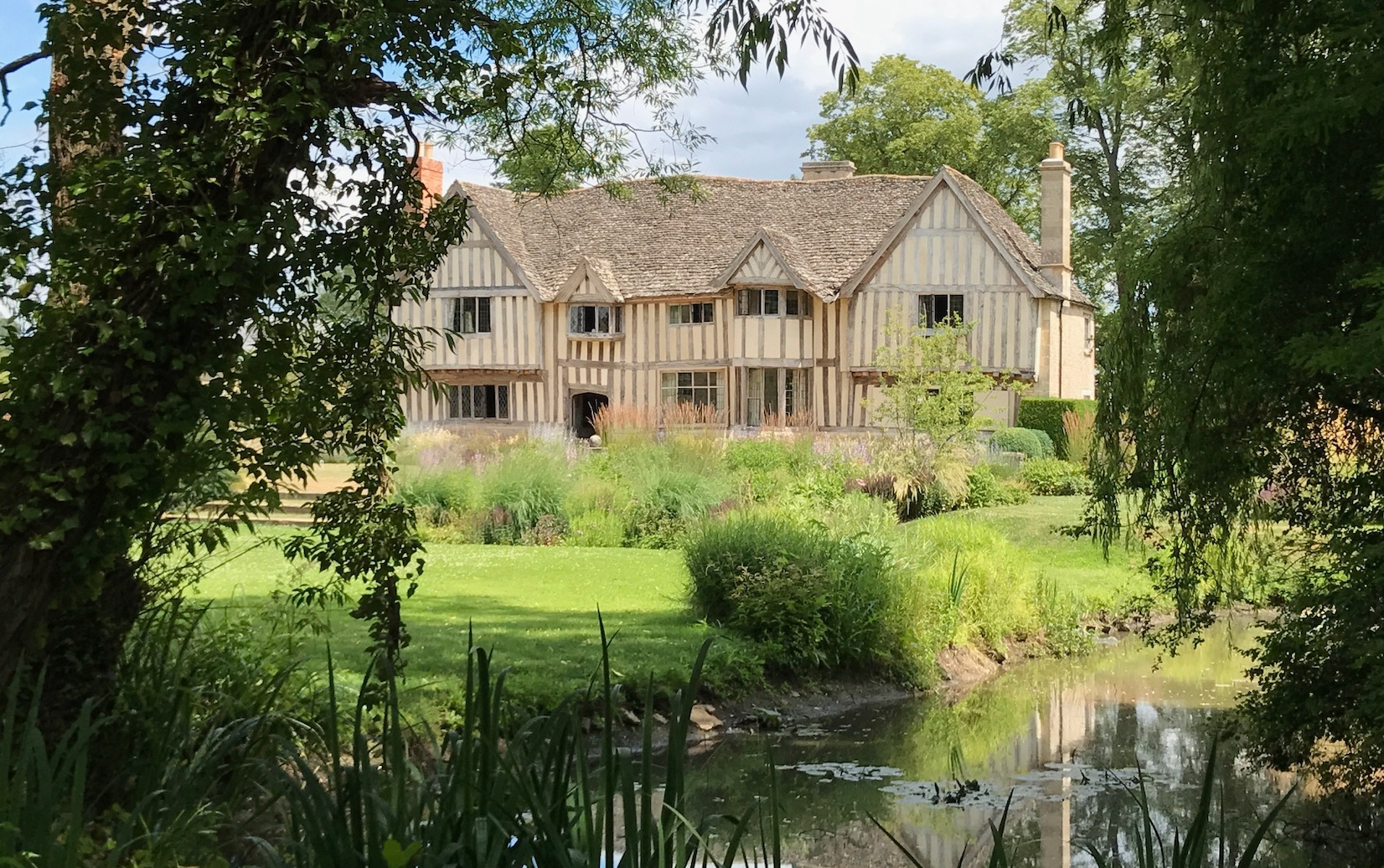
Yelford Manor, with the moat in the foreground (2017)

A Saxon manor house is believed to have stood on the same site as the current manor house. Excavations under the hall floor of the current building in 1952 revealed pottery and bones that were dated to the 11th and 12th centuries. The excavation went down only four feet, and it is possible that more and earlier remains still lay below. The foundations were revealed as large unmortared stones that came out as steps into the room. This was dated as very early in type - early medieval. The joint in the wall plate between the oriel and the wall of the hall appears to be late 13th century in type.

In the latter part of the 15th century the Hastings family re-built the manor house as a timber-framed building with a moat. It was altered again in about 1600, when a first floor was inserted in what until then had been the great hall and a great stone chimneystack was added.

In 1651 the Hastings family sold the manor of Yelford to William Lenthall, who was Speaker of the House of Commons during the Long Parliament, Rump Parliament and First Protectorate Parliament. The manor remained in the Lenthall family until 1949.

Most of the south wing of the manor house was demolished in 1848. Early in the 20th century the house was divided into three homes, but by the middle of the century it was derelict. It was purchased and restored in 1952 by the Babington Smith family. In the 1970s Jennifer Sherwood described the house as "The best, and certainly the most picturesque, large timber-framed house in the county."

== Church ==
The small Church of England parish church, dedicated to Saint Nicholas and Saint Swithun, was rebuilt around 1500. It was restored at some time between 1869 and 1873, which may be when the bellcote was added.

== Population ==
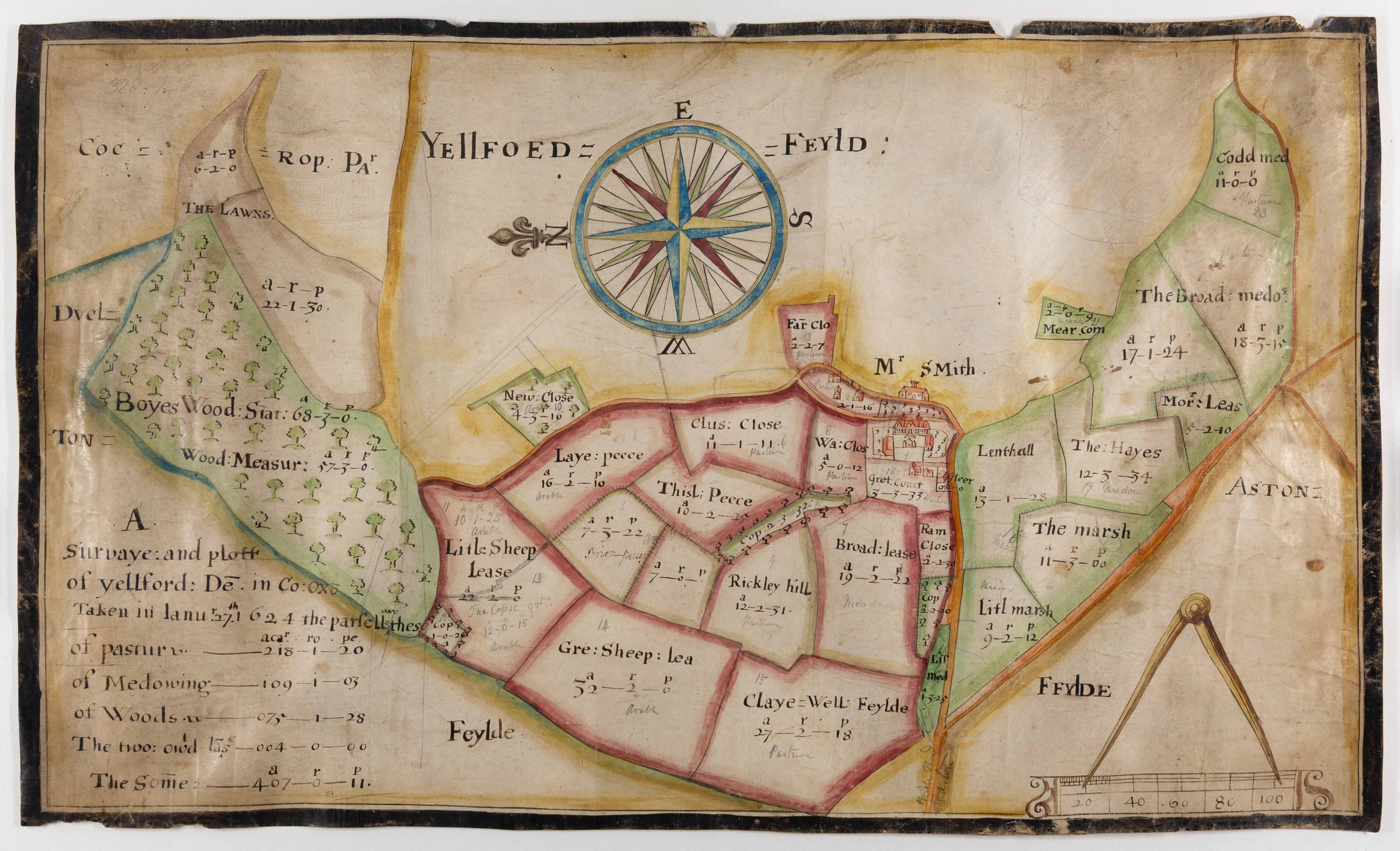
Estate Map of Yelford Village, 1625, Royal Berkshire Archives, D/EL1 P2

Yelford was always a small parish. In 1086 the Domesday Book listed Yelford as comprising just 3 villagers, 3 smallholders and 4 slaves. There were 3 ploughlands, 2 Lord's plough teams, and 0.5 men's plough teams, as well as 36 acres of meadow and 15 acres of pasture.. Even at its pre-Black Death peak; in 1327 there were only 16 taxpayers.

The Black Death decimated the village in 1348–1349 and this has been evidenced by subsequent archaeological exploration. The Oxfordshire Museum has a large archive of pottery and other artefacts from Yelford, with the great bulk of it being early medieval, up to 1350. There is then very little archaeological evidence from Yelford after that period until some 17th century slipware, which mainly came from round the manor house.

By the 16th century were only 2 to 3 taxable households. By 1851 the population was only 17. The parish was merged with Hardwick in 1932, subject to some adjustments to the boundaries with the neighbouring parishes of Ducklington and Standlake, to form a new civil parish called Hardwick-with-Yelford. At the 1931 census (the last before the abolition of the parish), Yelford had a population of 17.

== Sources ==
- Baggs, A. P.; Chance, Eleanor; Colvin, Christina; Day, C. J.; Selwyn, Nesta; Townley, S. C. (1996). "Yelford". In Crossley, Alan; Currie, C. R. J. (eds.). A History of the County of Oxford: Volume 13. Victoria County History. London. pp. 205–217. ISBN 978-0-19722-790-9.
- Sherwood, Jennifer; Pevsner, Nikolaus (1974). Oxfordshire. The Buildings of England. Harmondsworth: Penguin Books. p. 869. ISBN 978-0-14-071045-8.
