= Mulberry Bush =

Mulberry Bush may refer to:

- The nursery rhyme Here We Go Round the Mulberry Bush
- Pop Goes the Weasel, which references a mulberry bush in at least one verse of the song.
- Mulberry Bush School, an independent residential special school in Standlake, Oxfordshire

== See also ==
- The Mulberry Bush, a pub in Birmingham bombed during a terrorist attack in 1974
