= Hardwick, Oxfordshire =

Hardwick is the name of two villages in Oxfordshire, England:

- Hardwick, West Oxfordshire near Witney,
- Hardwick, Cherwell near Bicester.
