= Brighthampton =

Hamlet in Oxfordshire, England

Coordinates: 51.732°N 01.445°W

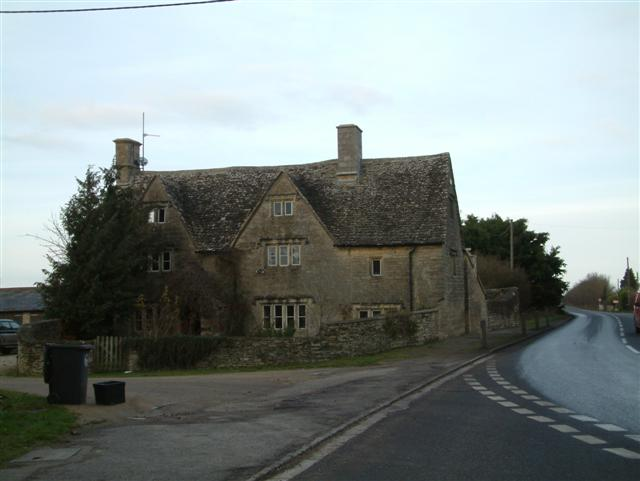
- Manor Farmhouse, Brighthampton

- Location within Oxfordshire
- OS grid reference: SP3803
- Civil parish: Standlake
- District: West Oxfordshire
- Shire county: Oxfordshire
- Region: South East
- Country: England
- Sovereign state: United Kingdom
- Post town: Witney
- Postcode district: OX29
- Dialling code: 01865
- Police: Thames Valley
- Fire: Oxfordshire
- Ambulance: South Central
- UK Parliament: Witney
- Website: Welcome to Standlake Oxfordshire

Brighthampton is a hamlet which is contiguous with the village of Standlake, about 4 miles (6.4 km) south of Witney, in West Oxfordshire, in the county of Oxfordshire, England.

== Archaeology ==
A large pagan burial ground from the 5th and 6th centuries has been found south of Malthouse Farm in Brighthampton. It was revealed when ploughing disturbed human bones in 1820. Excavation in 1857–58 found 54 burials, 10 cremation burials and a wide range grave goods, which are now in the Ashmolean Museum in Oxford. Notable artefacts found include an iron sword with a gilt scabbard and an ornate gilt brooch. Since then set of six burials was found at Malthouse Farm in 1892, and the burial of a child was found in 1949.

== History ==
Brighthampton's toponym means Beorhthelm's tūn. In the 10th century it was part of the royal manor of Bampton, and in 984 Æthelred II gave land at Brighthampton to one of his ministers. The Domesday Book records that in 1086 William the Conqueror's half-brother Odo, Bishop of Bayeux was Brighthampton's feudal overlord. However, William I imprisoned Odo from 1082 until 1087 and confiscated his lands. In 1131 Henry I granted land at Brighthampton to Sées Priory in Normandy. This is likely to have been the same land that William I had confiscated from Odo. At the same time Henry granted land at Hardwick to the same priory, and these together became a single manor of Hardwick and Brighthampton. There is a record from early in the 17th century of Brighthampton having a stone cross, and in 1857 it was recorded that there was still the base of an "ancient" stone cross (presumably medieval) at the hamlet's central crossroads.

Brighthampton always had a very close relationship with the neighbouring village of Standlake; they shared fields for working together under the open-field system in medieval times. Both Standlake and Brighthampton had formed part of the ancient parish of Bampton. When Standlake became a separate parish around the 14th century, the parish boundary was drawn to match the land ownership boundaries of the various manors, leading to a very convoluted boundary around Brighthampton; the small settlement of Brighthampton was split between Standlake and Bampton parishes.

For the purposes of administering the poor laws from the 17th century onwards, there was a Brighthampton township covering the parts of Brighthampton within the parish of Bampton, which administered the poor laws separately from other parts of Bampton parish. As such, this Brighthampton township (which did not include the parts of Brighthampton in Standlake parish) became a separate civil parish in 1866 when the legal definition of 'parish' was changed to be the areas used for administering the poor laws. In 1932 the civil parish of Brighthampton was abolished and its area absorbed into the civil parish of Standlake. At the 1931 census (the last before its abolition), the Brighthampton civil parish had a population of 33.

== Historic buildings ==
Forge Cottage is a 16th-century timber-framed building supported by a central cruck. By 1776 it was trading as a public house, the Red Lion. Another pub in Brighthampton, the Golden Balls, had been licensed by 1753. It was rebuilt early in the 20th century, ceased trading in 1992 and was demolished in 1994. The farmhouse of Manor Farm (also called Florey's Farm) is of Cotswold stone and was built early in the 17th century. It was extended in the middle of the 17th century and again in the 19th century.

== Baptist chapel ==
A few families of nonconformists were recorded in the parish in the latter part of the 17th century, and in the 18th century several local families were Anabaptists who attended a chapel in Cote. A Baptist chapel was built between Brighthampton and Standlake in 1832, flourished in the 1840s and 50's and a gallery was added to increase capacity in 1865. In the 20th century falling attendances led to services being discontinued in 1937, but they were resumed in 1951. The chapel finally closed in 1978 and in 1994 it was serving as the offices of a missionary society. It is now a private house.

== Sources and further reading ==
- Atkinson, R.J.C.; Kirk, J.R. (1949). "Archaeological Notes 1949" (PDF). Oxoniensia. XIV. Oxford Architectural and Historical Society: 75. ISSN 0308-5562.
- Baggs, A.P.; Chance, Eleanor; Colvin, Christina; Day, C.J.; Selwyn, Nesta; Townley, Simon C. (1996). "Standlake". In Crossley, Alan; Currie, C.R.J. (eds.). A History of the County of Oxford. Victoria County History. Vol. 13: Bampton Hundred (Part One). pp. 171–180. ISBN 978-0-19722-790-9.
- Ford, Steve; Preston, Steve (2002). "Medieval Occupation at The Orchard, Brighthampton" (PDF). Oxoniensia. LXVII. Oxfordshire Architectural and Historical Society: 287–312. ISSN 0308-5562.
