= Hardwick-with-Yelford =

Civil parish in West Oxfordshire, England

Coordinates: 51.760°N 1.466°W

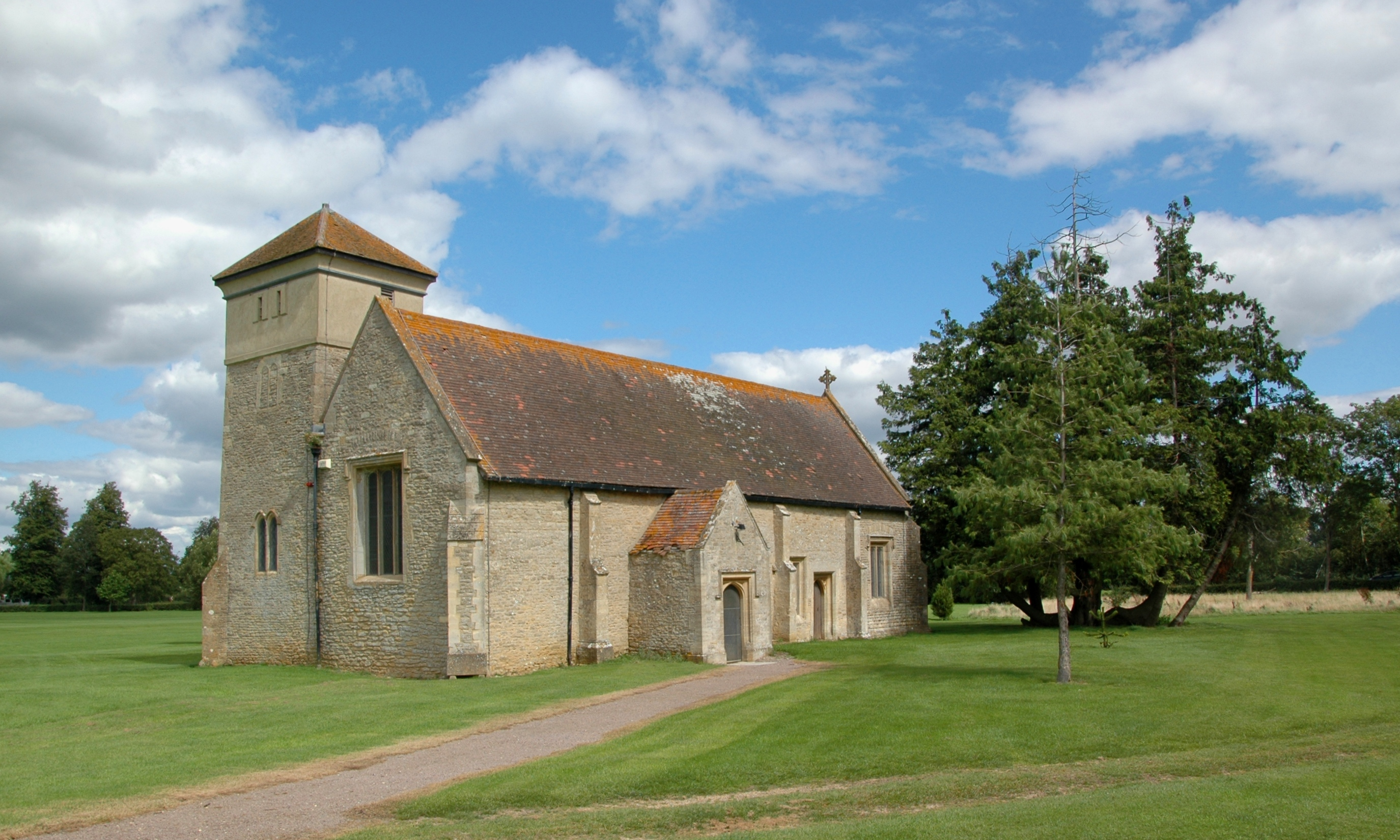

- Location within Oxfordshire
- Civil parish: Hardwick-with-Yelford
- District: West Oxfordshire
- Shire county: Oxfordshire
- Region: South East
- Country: England
- Sovereign state: United Kingdom
- UK Parliament: Witney

Hardwick-with-Yelford is a civil parish in West Oxfordshire, in the county of Oxfordshire, England. The parish includes the villages of Hardwick and Yelford. It was formed in 1932 from the parish of Yelford, most of the parish of Hardwick, and parts of the parishes of Ducklington and Standlake.

== Sources ==
- Baggs, A.P.; Chance, Eleanor; Colvin, Christina; Day, C.J.; Selwyn, Nesta; Townley, S.C. (1996). Crossley, Alan; Currie, C.R.J (eds.). Victoria County History: A History of the County of Oxford: Volume 13: Bampton Hundred (Part One). pp. 110–111.
