= Thomas Bruce (cricketer) =

English cricketer

Personal information
- Full name: Thomas Oscar Bruce
- Born: 10 February 1983 (age 43); Bampton, Oxfordshire, England
- Batting: Left-handed
- Bowling: Slow left-arm orthodox

Domestic team information
- Years: Team
- 2005: Durham UCCE

Career statistics
Competition	First-class
Matches	3
Runs scored	86
Batting average	43.00
100s/50s	–/–
Top score	26
Balls bowled	–
Wickets	–
Bowling average	–
5 wickets in innings	–
10 wickets in match	–
Best bowling	–
Catches/stumpings	4/–
- Source: Cricinfo, 21 August 2011

Thomas Oscar Bruce (born 10 February 1983) is an English former cricketer who played as a left-handed batsman and bowled slow left-arm orthodox. He was born in Bampton, Oxfordshire.

Bruce studied at Durham University, where he captained the university cricket team. While studying at Durham, he made his first-class debut for Durham UCCE against Somerset in 2005. He made two further first-class appearances that year, against Leicestershire and Durham. Across his three first-class appearances, he scored 86 runs at a batting average of 43.00.
