= Bampton Castle, Oxfordshire =

Castle in Bampton, Oxfordshire, England

Bampton Castle
- Bampton, Oxfordshire, England
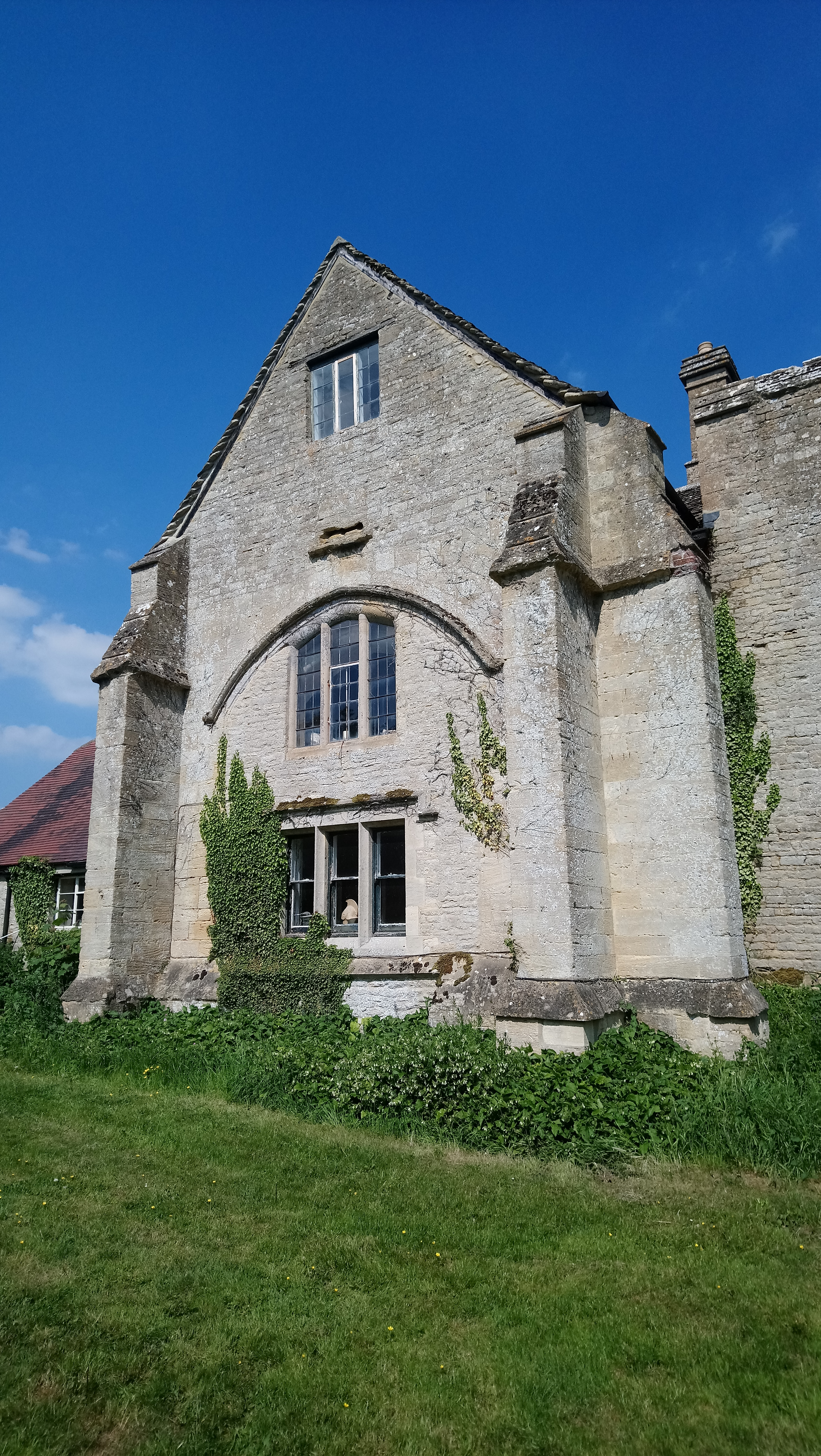
- The gatehouse from Bampton Castle, incorporated into Ham Court

Site information
- Owner: Oxfordshire County Council

Location
- Shown within Oxfordshire
- Coordinates: 51.7254°N 1.5530°W

Bampton Castle was in the village of Bampton, Oxfordshire (grid reference SP310031).

Differing accounts of its origin exist. One states that in about 1142 AD during the reign of Stephen, Matilda built a motte castle. According to other sources the castle was built in 1314–15, during the reign of Edward II, by Aymer de Valence, Earl of Pembroke, who obtained a licence from the king to "make a castle of his house at Bampton."

The castle is mentioned in Skelton's, Antiquities of Oxfordshire, where he states that the castle was four-sided, with a tower at each corner and a fortified gatehouse on the eastern and western sides and corbelled out turrets for additional fortification. The last known account of the castle intact is from Woods manuscript, preserved at Ashmolean Museum, wherein he states that when he visited the castle on the September 7, 1664, nearly the entire western side was intact.

The castle was demolished before 1789 but parts of its structure have been incorporated into a house, Ham Court, which is a Grade II* listed building.

There used to be an RAF communications station nearby which was called RAF Bampton Castle.

The castle (as it was in the 1360s) is the primary setting for the fictional medieval mystery series written by Mel Starr, the first of which is "The Unquiet Bones, the first chronicle of Hugh de Singleton, surgeon."

"Bampton Castle" was the name of the telephone exchange in the village. It was presumably so named in order to reduce confusion with telephone exchanges for other places in Britain called "Bampton" (which did not have castles). The exchange still exists, serving Bampton and neighbouring villages. Its location is not particularly close to the old castle.

== See also ==
- Castles in Great Britain and Ireland
- List of castles in England
