= Weald, Oxfordshire =

Hamlet in Oxfordshire, England

Coordinates: 51.718°N 1.554°W

Weald
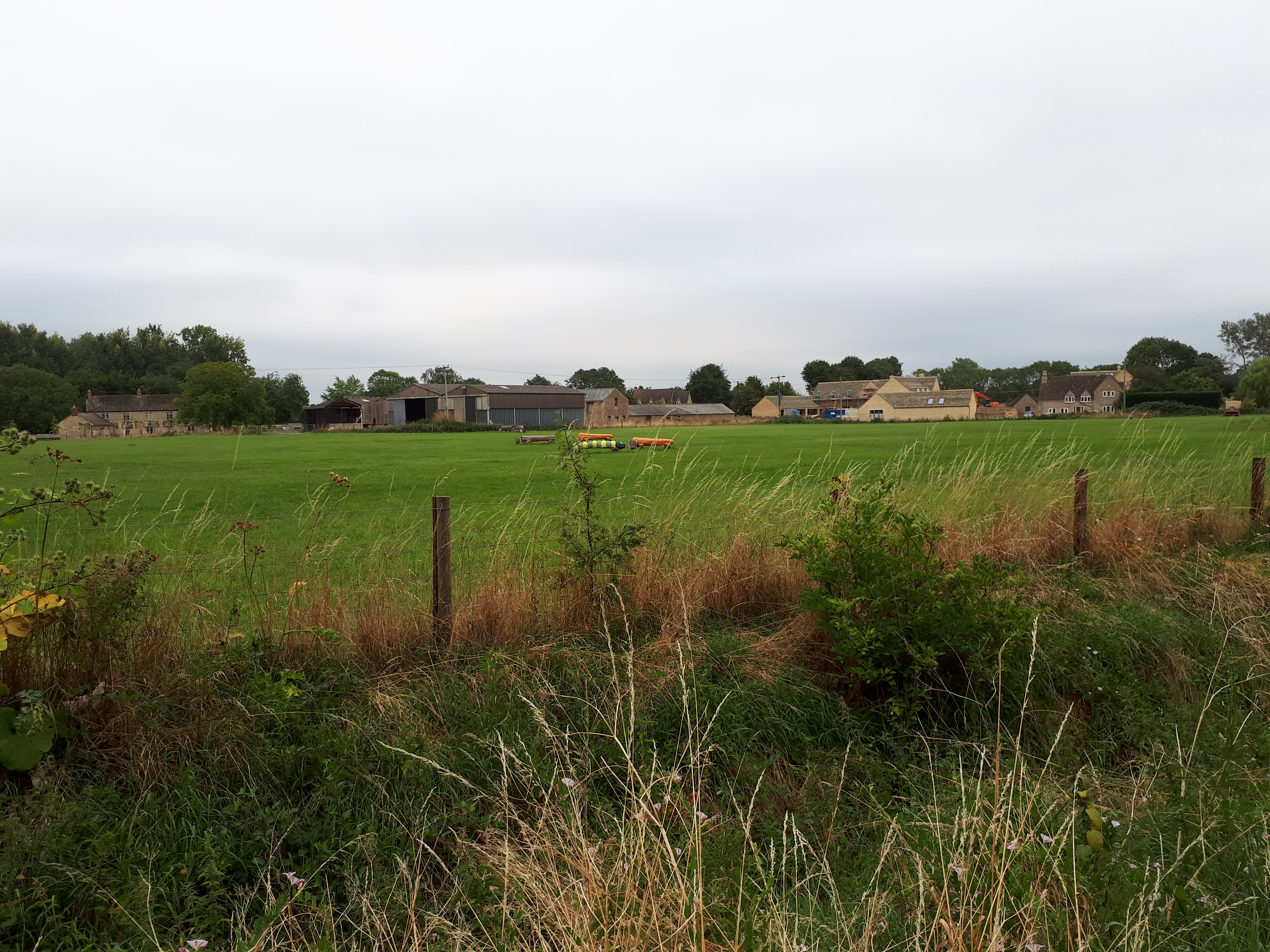
- View towards Weald

- Location within Oxfordshire
- OS grid reference: SP308022
- Civil parish: Bampton
- District: West Oxfordshire
- Shire county: Oxfordshire
- Region: South East
- Country: England
- Sovereign state: United Kingdom
- Post town: Bampton
- Postcode district: OX18
- Dialling code: 01993
- Police: Thames Valley
- Fire: Oxfordshire
- Ambulance: South Central
- UK Parliament: Witney
- Website: Bampton Oxfordshire

Weald is a hamlet in Bampton civil parish in Oxfordshire, England. It lies about 0.7 miles (1.1 km) southwest of Bampton.

== History ==
The toponym Weald is from the Old English for "woodland". The place was recorded by name in the late 12th century when Osney Abbey acquired a house there. It was a separate township by the 13th century. In the 18th and 19th centuries the township included much of the southwest part of the town of Bampton itself.

A large late 17th century manor house, Weald Manor, was remodelled at around 1730. It is a Grade II* listed building.

== Sources ==
- Crossley, Alan; Currie, C.R.J.; Baggs, A.P.; Chance, Eleanor; Colvin, Christina; Day, C.J.; Selwyn, Nesta; Townley, Simon C. (1996). A History of the County of Oxford, Volume 13: Bampton Hundred (Part One). Victoria County History. pp. 6–62.
- Sherwood, Jennifer; Pevsner, Nikolaus (1974). Oxfordshire. The Buildings of England. Harmondsworth: Penguin Books. pp. 433–434. ISBN 0-14-071045-0.
