= Barbara Dockar Drysdale =

British psychotherapist (1912–1999)

- Born: Barbara Estelle Gordon; 17 October 1912; Fitzwilliam Square
- Died: 18 March 1999 (aged 86); Fairford
- Other names: Pip Drysdale and Mrs D.
- Education: Tavistock Clinic and the Maudsley Hospital
- Occupation: psychotherapist
- Known for: starting a special school
- Children: 4

Barbara Dockar Drysdale or Barbara Estelle Gordon (17 October 1912 – 18 March 1999) was a British psychotherapist who started the Mulberry Bush School for troubled children after the Second World War.

== Life ==
Drysdale was born in Fitzwilliam Square in Dublin in 1912. Her father was a professor at Trinity College Dublin and a surgeon, and she would have been a doctor too but her father died suddenly and finances were not available for her to go to medical school. Instead, Drysdale decided to learn German and become a librarian. She went to stay in Austria. Drysdale was interested in books and she read Sigmund Freud with some interest.

In 1935 she found that she had a natural talent for child psychology as she worked at a playgroup. Her skills enabled her to control children without having to resort to punishments such as ignoring or excluding them.

Because of her work with troubled children during the Second World War, despite her lack of qualifications, she was encouraged by the Home Office and the Ministry of Education to start a special school. She started the Mulberry Bush School as an independent residential special school in Standlake, Oxfordshire. The school looks after children aged 5 to 12 years.

She took qualifications in psychotherapy at the Tavistock Clinic and at Maudsley Hospital in London. She was mixing with leading figures such as the Austrian Melanie Klein, Anna Freud and Leila Rendel. The latter had already started a similar facility for disturbed children called the Caldecott Community in 1911. Her mentor was the pediatric psychiatrist Donald Winnicott.

She was regarded as an expert in this area and spoke about the problem of children who through mistreatment had lost the ability to feel; what she called the "frozen child". She and her husband became co-principals in the school. They both stood down from this position in 1962 although Barbara was still an adviser until 1975.

She went on to work with the former "Cotswold Community" children's home at Ashton Keynes, Wiltshire.

Drysdale died in Fairford, Gloucestershire, and she was buried in the local church.
