= Bampton, Oxfordshire =

Civil parish in Oxfordshire, England

Coordinates: 51.727°N 1.544°W

Bampton: Bampton-in-the-Bush
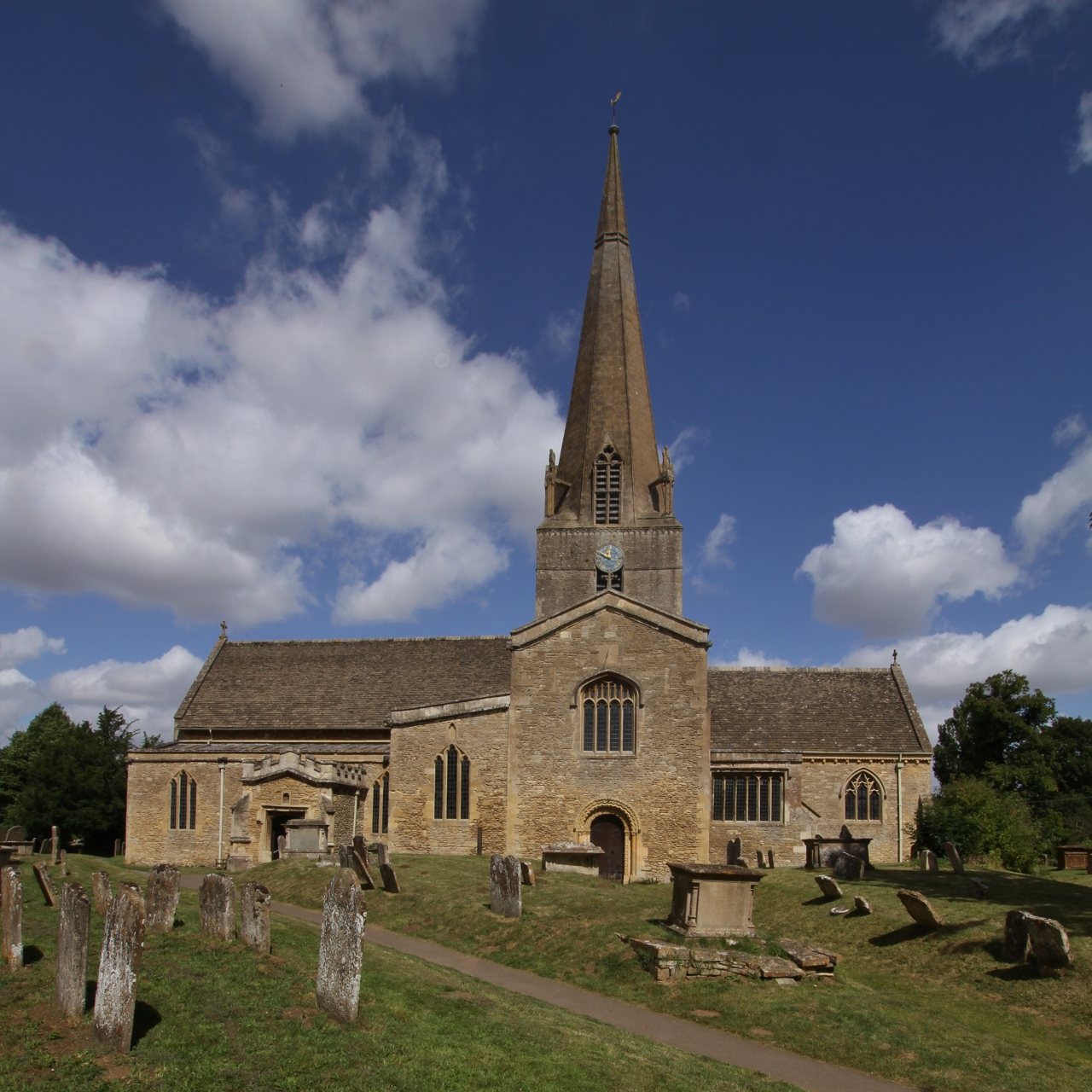
- St Mary the Virgin parish church

- Location within Oxfordshire
- Population: 2,994 (Parish, 2021)
- OS grid reference: SP315031
- Civil parish: Bampton
- District: West Oxfordshire
- Shire county: Oxfordshire
- Region: South East
- Country: England
- Sovereign state: United Kingdom
- Post town: Bampton
- Postcode district: OX18
- Dialling code: 01993
- Police: Thames Valley
- Fire: Oxfordshire
- Ambulance: South Central
- UK Parliament: Witney
- Website: Bampton Oxfordshire

Bampton, also called Bampton-in-the-Bush, is a settlement and civil parish in the West Oxfordshire district of Oxfordshire, England. It lies about 4 1/2 miles (7 km) south-west of Witney. Bampton is variously referred to as both a town and a village; it has both a town hall and a village hall. As well as the built up area of Bampton itself, the parish also includes surrounding rural areas, including the hamlet of Weald. At the 2021 census the parish had a population of 2,994.

St Mary's Church dates back to Saxon times and was originally a minster church. By the time of the Domesday Book in 1086, Bampton was a market town. The market continued to operate until the 1890s. Bampton Castle existed from at least the 14th century until most of it was demolished in the 18th century.

== Geography ==
The core of the village is on gravel terraces formed of Summertown-Radley or flood plain terrace deposits. It is just east of Shill Brook, which flows south to join the River Thames, and just north of a smaller stream that flows west to join Shill Brook. The A4095 road passes through the village. The civil parish measures about 3 1/2 miles (5.6 km) north – south and about 2 1/2 miles (4 km) east – west. It is bounded to the south by the River Thames, to the east by Aston Ditch, and to the west and north by ditches and field boundaries. A small part of the airfield of RAF Brize Norton is in northernmost part of the parish.

== History ==
=== Early settlement ===
The Bampton area has been settled since the Iron Age and Roman periods. The Exeter Book of 1070 records the toponym as Bemtun. The Domesday Book of 1086 records it as Bentone. A charter or roll from 1212 records it as Bamtun. It is derived from the Old English bēam-tūn, which could mean either "tūn by the beam" or "tūn made from beams". Tūn is an Old English word that originally meant a fence, and came to mean an enclosure or homestead.

The Domesday Book recorded that Bampton was a market town by 1086. The market continued to operate until the 1890s.

=== Parish church ===
The earliest parts of the Church of England parish church of Saint Mary the Virgin are 10th- or 11th-century, when it was built as a late Saxon Minster. It was rebuilt in the 12th century as a cruciform Norman church. It received Gothic additions from late in the 13th century to early in the 16th century. The architect Ewan Christian restored it in 1868–70. It is a Grade I listed building.

=== Bampton Castle ===
In 1315 King Edward II granted Aymer de Valence, 2nd Earl of Pembroke a licence to crenellate at Bampton. He had Bampton Castle built just west of Shill Brook. Much of the building survived until the Commonwealth of England in the 17th century, when the gatehouse and part of the curtain wall were adapted to form Ham Court. It is now a private house and a Grade II* listed building.

== Other notable buildings ==
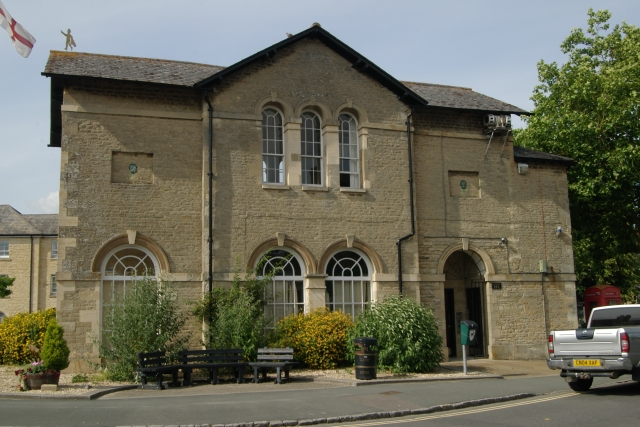
Bampton Town Hall

After the Norman conquest of England, William the Conqueror granted the church of St Mary the Virgin to Leofric, Bishop of Exeter. The Dean and Chapter of Exeter Cathedral have held the advowson of the parish ever since. Late in the 11th or early in the 12th century the Dean and Chapter had a prebendal house built just west of the parish church. There is some 13th-century work on the east wing, and the house was altered and enlarged in the 16th, 17th and 19th centuries. It is now called The Deanery and is a Grade II* listed building. Weald Manor is a manor house west of Shill Brook and south of Ham Court. It was built in the 17th century and enlarged in 1742. It is a Grade II* listed building.

South of St Mary's is Churchgate House, which used to be the Rectory. The oldest part of the house is 16th-century, with a datestone inscribed "1546 Vicar Joan Dotin". In 1799 a new Georgian main block was added to the front of the building by the builder and architect Daniel Harris. In 1635 Robert Veysey, a wool merchant, died leaving £100 to build and endow a free school in Bampton. This was built in Church View near the junction with Church Street, the first schoolmaster was appointed in 1650 and the building was completed in 1653. The building is now Bampton's public library. Bampton Town Hall was completed in 1838 and now houses Bampton Arts Centre.

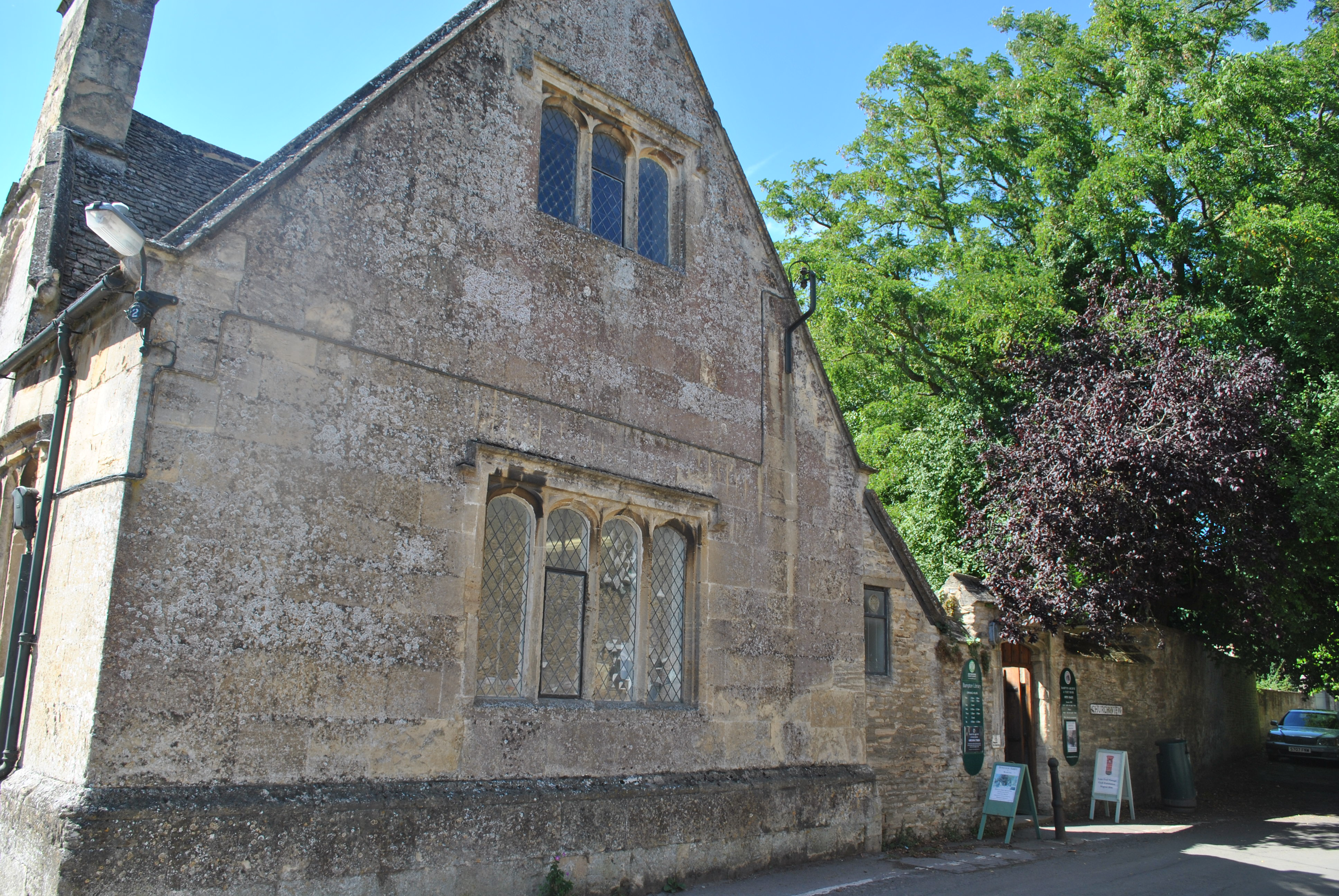
The public library, built in the 1650s as the free school

== Governance ==
There are three tiers of local government covering Bampton, at parish, district and county level: Bampton Parish Council, West Oxfordshire District Council, and Oxfordshire County Council. The parish council has an office at Bampton Town Hall and generally meets at the Old School Community Centre.

=== Administrative history ===
Bampton was an ancient parish in the Bampton hundred of Oxfordshire. The parish was subdivided into eight hamlets: Aston, Brighthampton, Chimney, Cote, Lew, Shifford, Weald, and a Bampton hamlet covering the central part of the parish around the town itself. From the 17th century onwards, parishes were given various civil functions under the poor laws in addition to their original ecclesiastical functions. In some cases, including Bampton, parish functions under the poor laws were exercised by subdivisions of the parish rather than the parish as a whole. In Bampton's case, the hamlets of Aston and Cote jointly administered poor law functions, as did the hamlets of Bampton and Weald, whilst the other four townships each administered the poor laws on their own. As such, the old parish became six civil parishes in 1866 when the legal definition of 'parish' was changed to be the areas used for administering the poor laws, with the Bampton civil parish thereafter just covering the two old hamlets of Bampton and Weald.

== Transport ==
In 1861 the East Gloucestershire Railway was built through the northernmost part of the parish, about 2 miles (3 km) north of the village. In 1873 a station was opened in Brize Norton parish. It was about 1 mile (1.6 km) south of Brize Norton village and 2 miles (3 km) north of Bampton, but the station was named "Bampton".

In 1937 RAF Brize Norton was established and in 1940 the Great Western Railway renamed the station Brize Norton and Bampton. British Railways closed the station and the East Gloucestershire Railway in 1962. Bampton is served by bus route 19, which is run by Pulhams Coaches and runs every hour between Carterton, Standlake and Witney Monday to Saturday daytimes. There is no Sunday or bank holiday service.

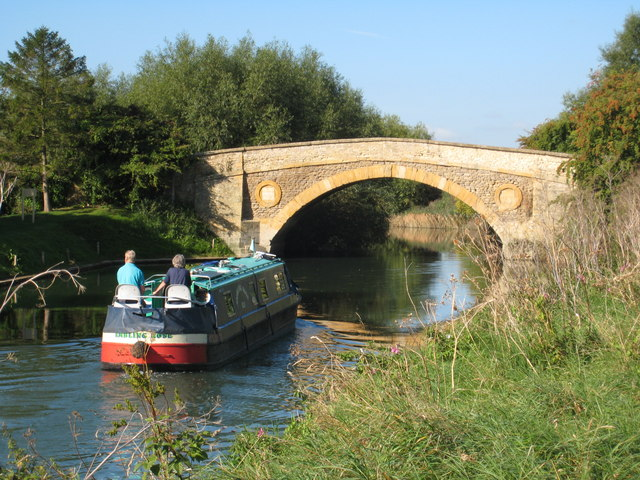
Tadpole Bridge carries the road between Bampton and Buckland

== Village life ==
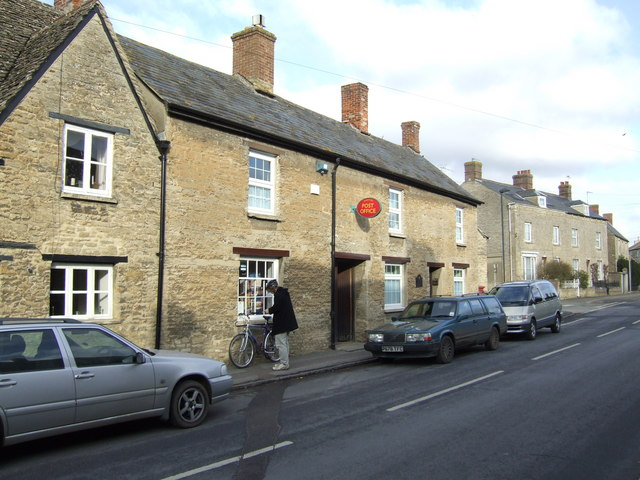
The former Bampton Post Office, now a private house

=== Culture ===
Bampton has a tradition of Morris dancing which may be 600 years old. Documentary and circumstantial evidence show that Morris dancing in Bampton goes back at least to the 1790s. It used to be performed in Bampton on Whit Monday but the date has recently changed to the late May bank holiday. The town is also the home of Bampton Classical Opera which performs both in Bampton and elsewhere.

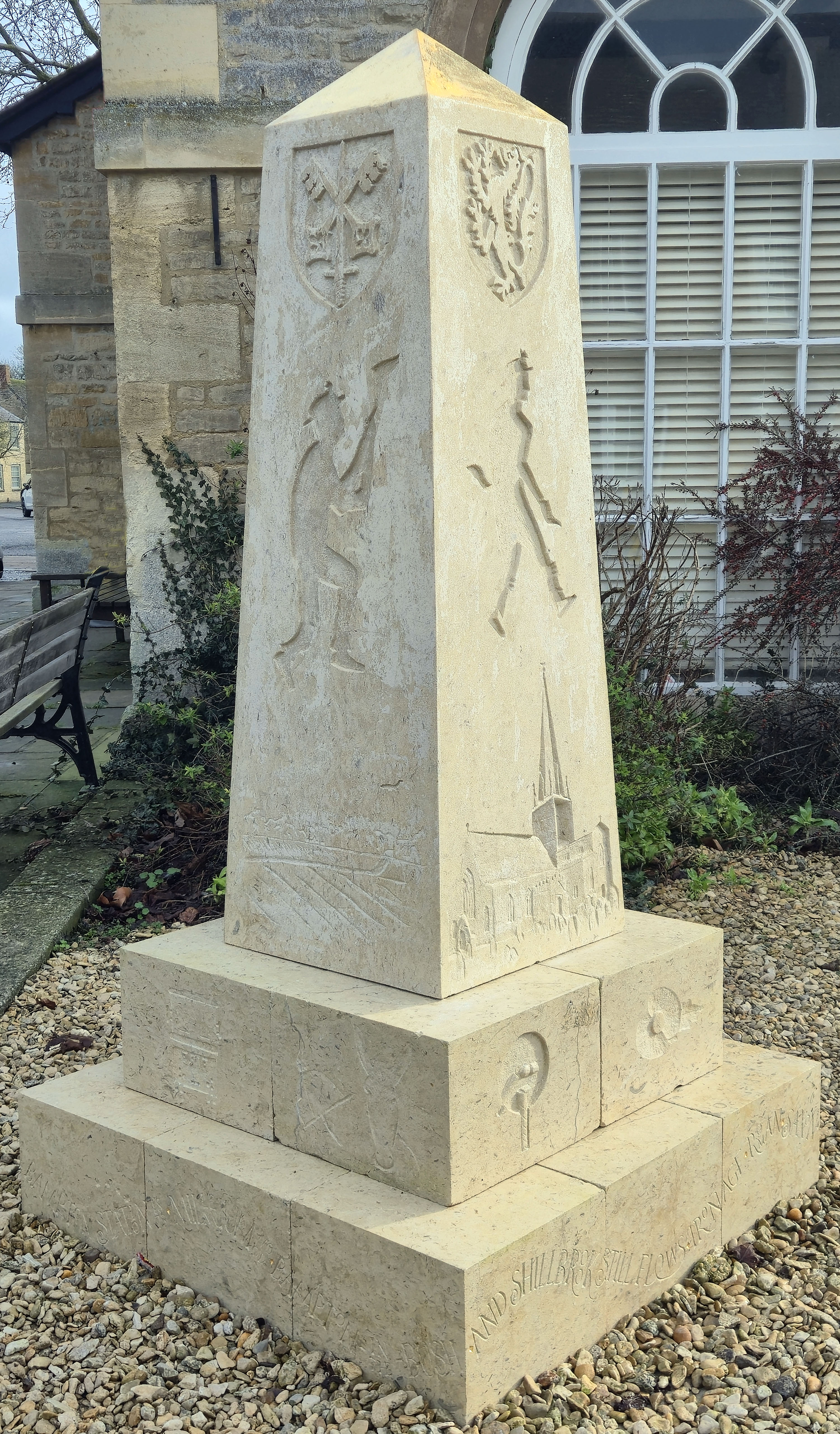
Two faces of The Bampton Obelisk, with the Town Hall in the background

Bampton Youth Centre was founded in 1984 in the former Victorian primary school building.

In January 2026 The Bampton Obelisk was erected outside the Town Hall in the centre of the village. It was commissioned by the Parish Council using Section 106 funding and was designed, carved and installed by sculptor David Williams, a resident of the village. The Obelisk bears the heraldic shields of the owners of the village as recorded in the Domesday Book of 1086, village scenes, and village life including morris dancers, Aunt Sally, the Donkey Derby and the village's annual Shirt Race. The base bears text which tells a brief and selective history of the village. The obelisk is topped with gold leaf.

=== Sport ===
Bampton Town Football Club is affiliated to the Oxfordshire Football Association and plays at Buckland Road, Bampton. The club has senior, youth, junior, and veteran teams. The Bampton & District Aunt Sally Association, formed in 1971, plays the traditional throwing game Aunt Sally, which is played at pubs almost all of which are in Oxfordshire. Bampton Skatepark was built for the village's skateboarders and BMX riders.

== Notable people ==
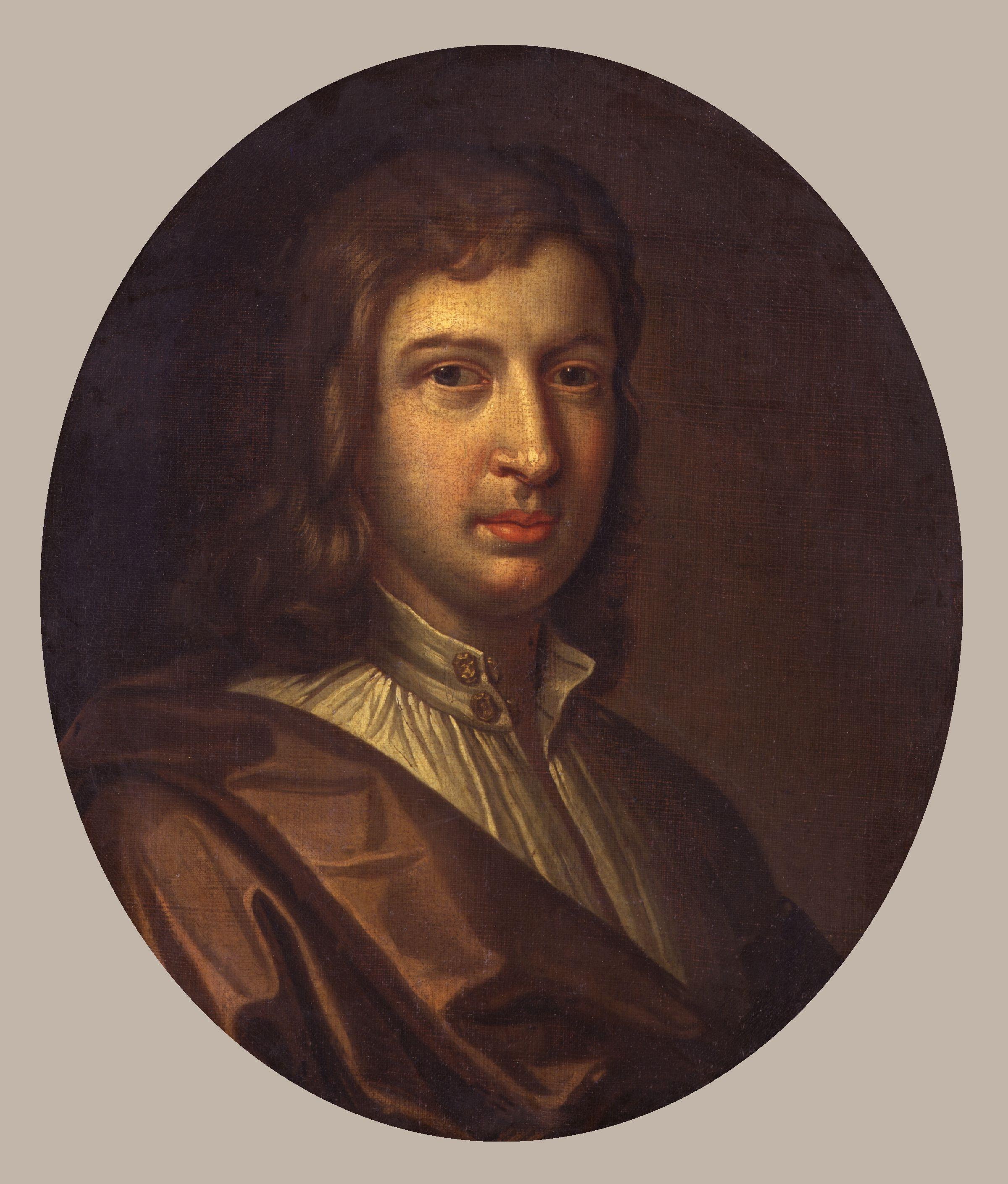
John Philips

- John Philips (1676 in Bampton – 1709) an 18th-century English poet
- Sir Frederick Whitaker KCMG (1812 in Bampton – 1891) a New Zealand politician, twice the Prime Minister of New Zealand
- Thomas Temple (1818 in Bampton, Oxon – 1899) a farmer, lumberman, businessman and political figure in Fredericton, New Brunswick, Canada
- Walter David Taylor Powell (1831 in Bampton – 1906) an English mariner and paramilitary Australian native police officer in the British colonies of New South Wales and Queensland
- Air Marshal Sir Charles Roderick Carr KBE, CB, DFC, AFC (1891–1971) was a senior Royal Air Force commander from New Zealand; lived in Bampton in retirement (1947-1971)
- Molly Rose OBE, DL, JP (1920–2016) a British aviator, lived in Bampton from 1946 to 1974 & again from 1986 to 2016
- Thomas Bruce (born 1983 in Bampton) an English cricketer; a left-handed batsman & slow left-arm orthodox bowler

== In fiction ==
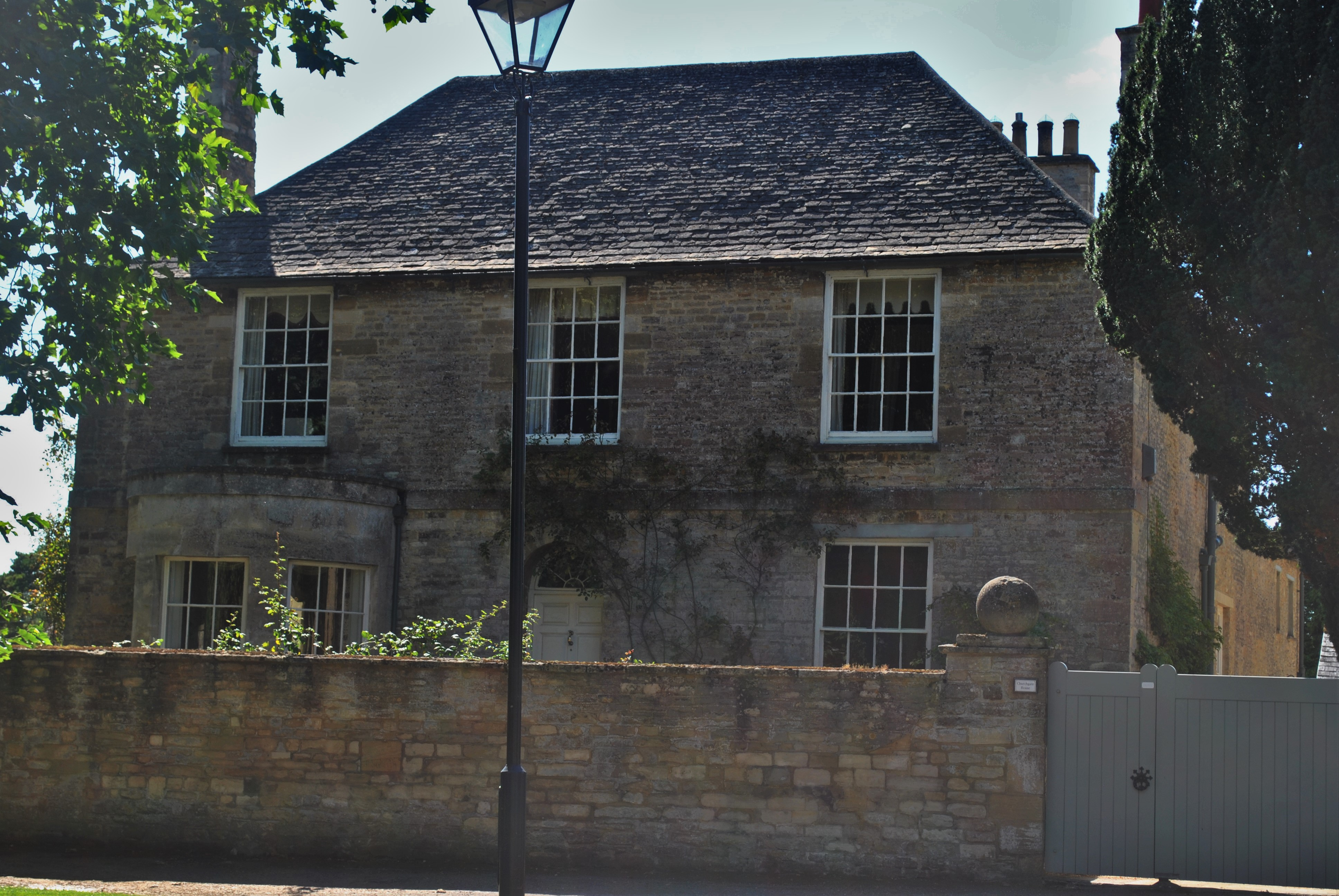
Churchgate House, the former Rectory

Bampton is one of the settings for the fictional crime novels The Chronicles of Hugh de Singleton, set in about 1366, by Mel Starr. ITV used Bampton for several outdoor locations for the fictional village of Downton, North Yorkshire in the period drama television series Downton Abbey. The main ones included the Old Rectory (Churchgate House), the public library, the parish church of St Mary the Virgin, and houses in Church View that were used to represent two pubs.

The fictitious Bampton School appears in Alan Hollinghurst's 2025 novel Our Evenings.

== Bibliography ==
- Aston, Michael; Bond, James (1976). The Landscape of Towns. Archaeology in the Field Series. London: J.M. Dent & Sons Ltd. pp. 87, 88. ISBN 0-460-04194-0.
- Blair, John (1984). "Saint Beornwald of Bampton" (PDF). Oxoniensia. XLIX. Oxford: Oxfordshire Architectural and Historical Society: 47–54.
- Crossley, Alan; Currie, CRJ (eds.); Baggs, AP; Chance, Eleanor; Colvin, Christina; Day, CJ; Selwyn, Nesta; Townley, Simon C. (1996). A History of the County of Oxford. Victoria County History. Vol. 13: Bampton Hundred (Part One). London: Oxford University Press for the Institute of Historical Research. ISBN 978-0-19722-790-9.
- Ekwall, Eilert (1960) [1936]. Concise Oxford Dictionary of English Place-Names (4th ed.). Oxford: Oxford University Press. Bampton. ISBN 0198691033.
- Giles, John Allen (1847). History of the Parish and Town of Bampton, with the District and Hamlets Belonging to It. Oxford: JH Parker.
- Sherwood, Jennifer; Pevsner, Nikolaus (1974). Oxfordshire. The Buildings of England. Harmondsworth: Penguin Books. pp. 429–435. ISBN 0-14-071045-0.
