= Bampton Town Hall =

Municipal building in Bampton, Oxfordshire, England

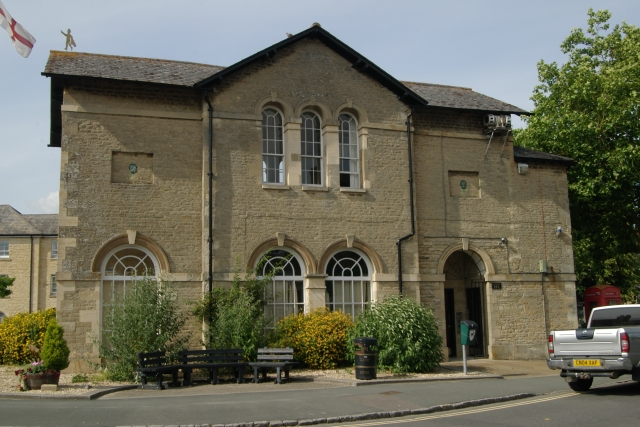
- Bampton Town Hall

- Shown in Oxfordshire
- 51.7265°N 1.5456°W
- Location: Market Square, Bampton

History
- Built: 1838

Site notes
- Architect: George Wilkinson
- Architectural style: Italianate style

Listed Building – Grade II
- Official name: Town Hall
- Designated: 12 September 1955
- Reference no.: 1198742

Bampton Town Hall is a municipal building in the Market Square in Bampton, Oxfordshire, England. The building, which is primarily used as an arts centre, is a Grade II listed building.

== History ==
In the early 19th century Bampton was one of the few market towns in the county without a market hall; local business leaders decided to raise the necessary funds by public subscription to erect a building in the Market Square. The site they selected was open land at the corner of Cheapside and the High Street where weekly markets were typically held.

The foundation stone for the new building was laid by one of the lords of the manor, Thomas Denton, on 8 August 1838. It was designed by George Wilkinson in the Italianate style, built by a local mason, James Pettifer, in rubble masonry at a cost of £300 and it was completed later that year. The design involved a symmetrical main frontage with three bays facing onto the High Street; the central bay, which slightly projected forward and was gabled, featured two openings with architraves and keystones on the ground floor and three tall round headed windows with architraves and keystones on the first floor. The outer bays featured openings with architraves and keystones on the ground floor and blind recessed panels containing fire insurance plaques, issued by the Liverpool and London Globe Insurance Company, on the first floor. Internally, the principal rooms were the market hall on the ground floor and the main assembly hall on the first floor.

The lords of the manor, Thomas Denton and Frederick Whitaker, conveyed the site to trustees after the building was completed and the conveyancing fees had been paid. The assembly hall was used for magistrates' court hearings and public events in the mid-19th century. The market in Bampton failed to attract many merchants and was described by one of the then lords of the manor, Edward Whitaker, in the mid 19th century as a "white elephant". The east end of the market hall was converted into garaging for the horse-drawn fire engine in 1870, while the west end of the market hall was converted into a subscription reading room in 1884 and then into a public lending library in 1891.

Ownership of the building was transferred to the newly-formed Bampton Parish Council in 1895. The building was extended to the north and to the east at the expense of a local resident, Philip Southby, so improving improved access to the first floor, in 1906 and, following Southby's death, a clock was installed on the east side of the building, to commemorate his contribution to the town, in 1908. The east end of the ground floor continued to accommodate the local fire engine until the fire service moved to New Street in 1970. An extensive programme of refurbishment works costing £6,000 was carried out at that time. Following completion of the works, the parish council moved their meetings to a room on the ground floor and the first floor room was let to the West Oxfordshire Arts Association. The clock, which tended to break down, was taken down in 1972.

In 1974, poet and comedian Pam Ayres read a poem in the town hall at an early stage of her career.
