= Mulberry Bush School =

Special school in Witney, Oxfordshire, England

The Mulberry Bush School
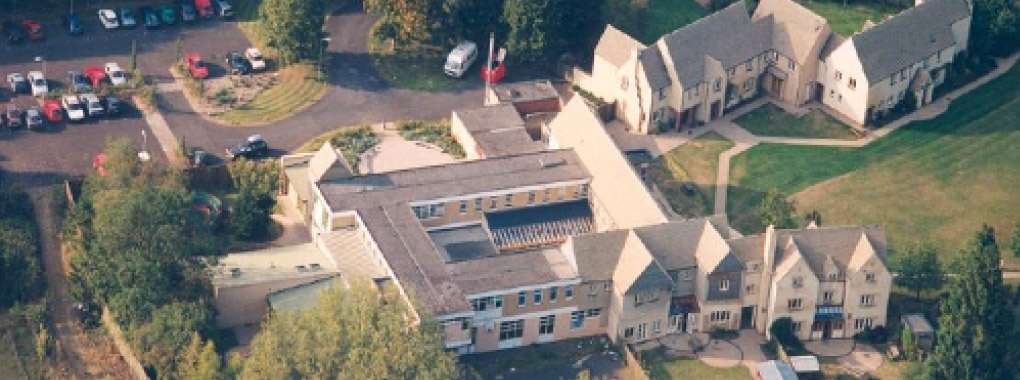

Location
- Abingdon Road; Standlake; Witney, Oxfordshire, OX29 7RW; England; 51.72104°N 1.434°W

Information
- Type: Non-Maintained Special School
- Established: 1948
- Founder: Barbara Dockar Drysdale
- Local authority: Oxfordshire
- Department for Education URN: 123330 Tables
- CEO: John Tuberville
- Head Teacher: Jessica Hooper
- Gender: Coeducational
- Age: 5 to 12
- Website: http://www.mulberrybush.org.uk/

The Mulberry Bush Charity was founded in 1948 as an independent residential special school in the village of Standlake in Oxfordshire, for children aged 5 to 12 years; nowadays it is a not-for-profit charity. It has now grown to include MB3 (The Mulberry Bush Third Space), The Mulberry Bush Outreach service, The Mulberry Bush Research and The Mulberry Bush Consulting.

== The school ==
The school was founded in 1948 by psychotherapist Barbara Dockar-Drysdale with the backing of the Ministry of Education and the Home Office. She and her husband were co-principals until 1962.

Set in 5 acres of rural Oxfordshire the School offers 38-week and 52-week residential care and education to children who have suffered early years trauma and have severe social, emotional and mental health difficulties.

The Mulberry Bush School offers individualised integrated therapeutic care, treatment and education overseen by a multidisciplinary team. Their continual focus is to help children learn to manage their emotions and behaviours through the development of safe and trusting relationships within a group setting.

== Outreach ==
The Mulberry Bush Outreach service aims to use the charity's core principles to strengthen the culture and leadership in organisations. This is achieved through the provision of training, consultation and support for those supporting vulnerable children, their families and communities.

They also provide all the training for staff across the charity, which is focused around the Level 5 Foundation Degree in Therapeutic Work with Children and Young People and ongoing professional development.

== MB3 (The Mulberry Bush Third Space) ==
This provides a residential and conference/event accommodation complemented by a meadow and woodland located in Toddington, Gloucestershire.

It is also the home of the Planned Environment Therapy Archives and special collections and the National Childcare Library.

== Mulberry Bush Research ==
The Mulberry Bush is committed to researching therapeutic practice with children and families, particularly in residential and education settings.

It aims to develop and shape a research culture to influence practice within The Mulberry Bush and other schools, agencies and providers of care to vulnerable, traumatised children and their families.

== Mulberry Bush Consulting ==
The Mulberry Bush, is well known for its therapeutic approach with children, and for their commitment to ensuring that core values, mission and vision are brought to life in all their work and at all levels of the organisation.

The Mulberry Bush Consultancy service was established to help others, in related sectors, to do the same.

== The International Centre for Therapeutic Care ==
The International Centre for Therapeutic Care is a global alliance promoting Therapeutic Childcare, Social Pedagogy and Trauma Informed Practice amongst all those working with children, young people, their families and communities made vulnerable by childhood trauma.

The school is a registered charity. The Mulberry Bush School is the subject of a BBC documentary film, Hold Me Tight, Let Me Go, directed by Kim Longinotto.

== See also ==
- List of schools in the South East of England
