= Hardwick, West Oxfordshire =

Village in Oxfordshire, England

Coordinates: 51.760°N 1.466°W

Hardwick
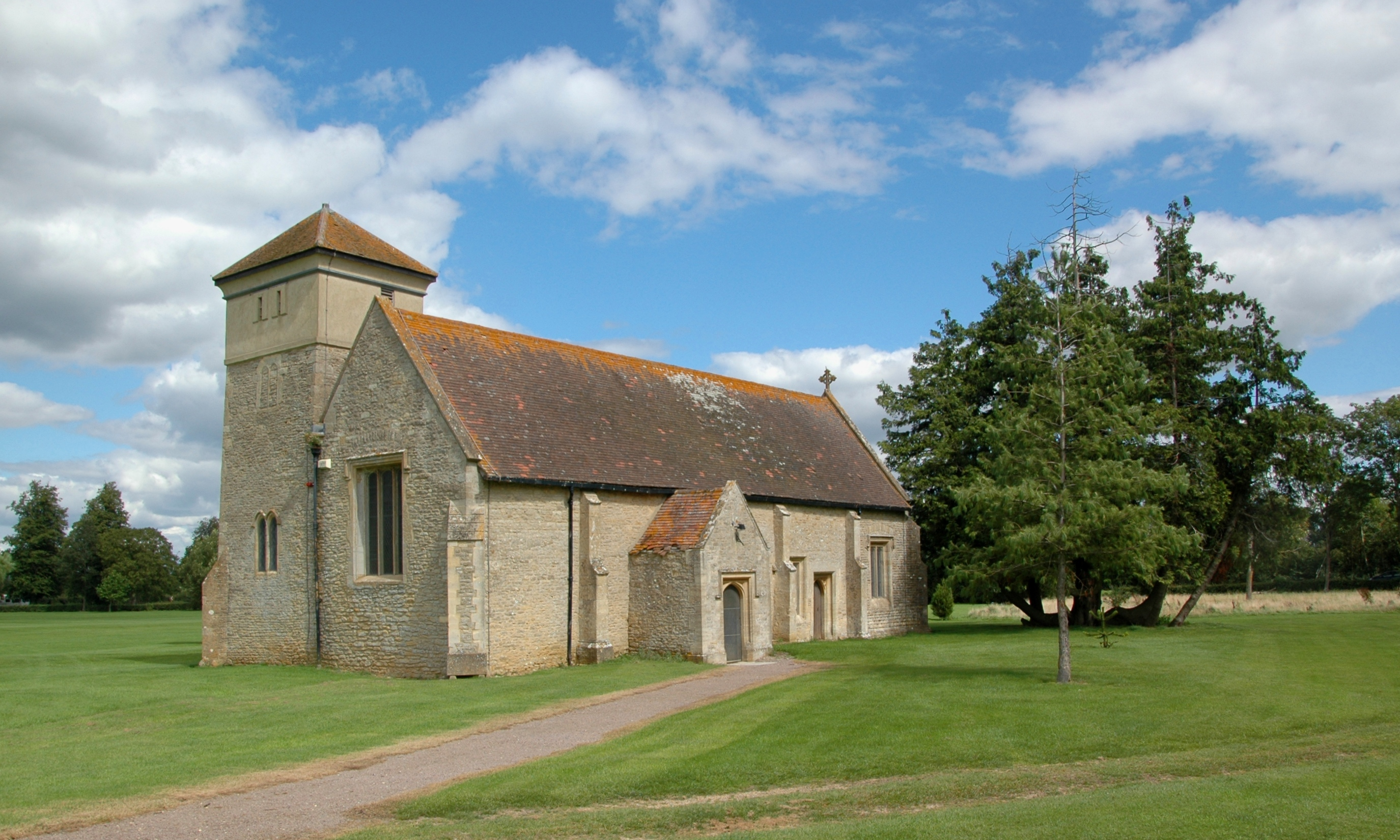
- The former St Mary's parish church; now Cokethorpe School chapel

- Location within Oxfordshire
- OS grid reference: SP3705
- Civil parish: Hardwick-with-Yelford
- District: West Oxfordshire
- Shire county: Oxfordshire
- Region: South East
- Country: England
- Sovereign state: United Kingdom
- Post town: Witney
- Postcode district: OX29
- Dialling code: 01993
- Police: Thames Valley
- Fire: Oxfordshire
- Ambulance: South Central
- UK Parliament: Witney

Hardwick is a village in the civil parish of Hardwick-with-Yelford, in the West Oxfordshire district of Oxfordshire, England. The village is on the River Windrush and the A415 road, about 2.5 miles (4 km) south-east of Witney.

== History ==
Hardwick was historically a township in the ancient parish of Ducklington. The township was also a chapelry, with the chapel of Cokethorpe House, dedicated to St Mary and built in the 15th century, also serving as a chapel of ease for Hardwick.

The township of Hardwick took on civil functions under the poor laws from the 17th century onwards. As such, it became a separate civil parish from Ducklington in 1866 when the legal definition of 'parish' was changed to be the areas used for administering the poor laws.

In 1932 Hardwick was merged with the neighbouring parish of Yelford, subject to some adjustments to the boundaries with the neighbouring parishes of Ducklington and Standlake, to form a new civil parish called Hardwick-with-Yelford. At the 1931 census (the last before the abolition of the parish), Hardwick had a population of 97.
