= The Chronicles of Hugh de Singleton =

Fictional mystery book series

The Chronicles of Hugh de Singleton, Surgeon are a series of seventeen fictional medieval mysteries written by Mel Starr. The first, published in 2008 by Monarch Books, is The Unquiet Bones. The second, published in 2009, is A Corpse at St. Andrew's Chapel. The third, published in 2010, is A Trail of Ink. The fourth, published in 2011, is Unhallowed Ground. The fifth, sixth & seventh in the series are The Tainted Coin, Rest Not in Peace and The Abbot's Agreement.

Subsequent books in the series include Ashes to Ashes, Lucifer's Harvest, Deeds of Darkness, Prince Edward's Warrant, Without a Trace, The Easter Sepulchre, Master Wycliffe’s Summons, Suppression and Suspicion, A Polluted Font and, The Way of the Wicked.

== Plot ==
Hugh de Singleton is a newly practicing surgeon in medieval Oxford, England when he comes to the aid of a local lord who is injured.

The Lord hires him to come to his manor of Bampton, and subsequently to be his Bailiff at Bampton Castle (which was an existing castle in the 1360s). In his dual role as surgeon and bailiff Hugh is called upon to solve a series of mysterious murders and other crimes, which make up the plots of the various books.

Hugh is also in search of a wife, which imparts a nice romantic subplot to the beginning of the series; he later marries and fathers two daughters and one son. A minor character is Master John Wycliffe, who is Hugh's mentor, and was a real person, famous for his translation of the Bible in to common English, and for his arguments with the church hierarchy. The characters of several of the Bampton citizens are also based on real historical people, as the author explains in his book notes.

== Author ==
Melvin R. Starr was raised in Kalamazoo, Michigan, earned his MA in history from Western Michigan University and taught history in Michigan for thirty-nine years. At retirement, he was chairman of the social studies department of Portage Northern High School. Starr had studied both medieval medicine and medieval English.
