= Standlake =

Village in Oxfordshire, England

Coordinates: 51.728°N 1.428°W

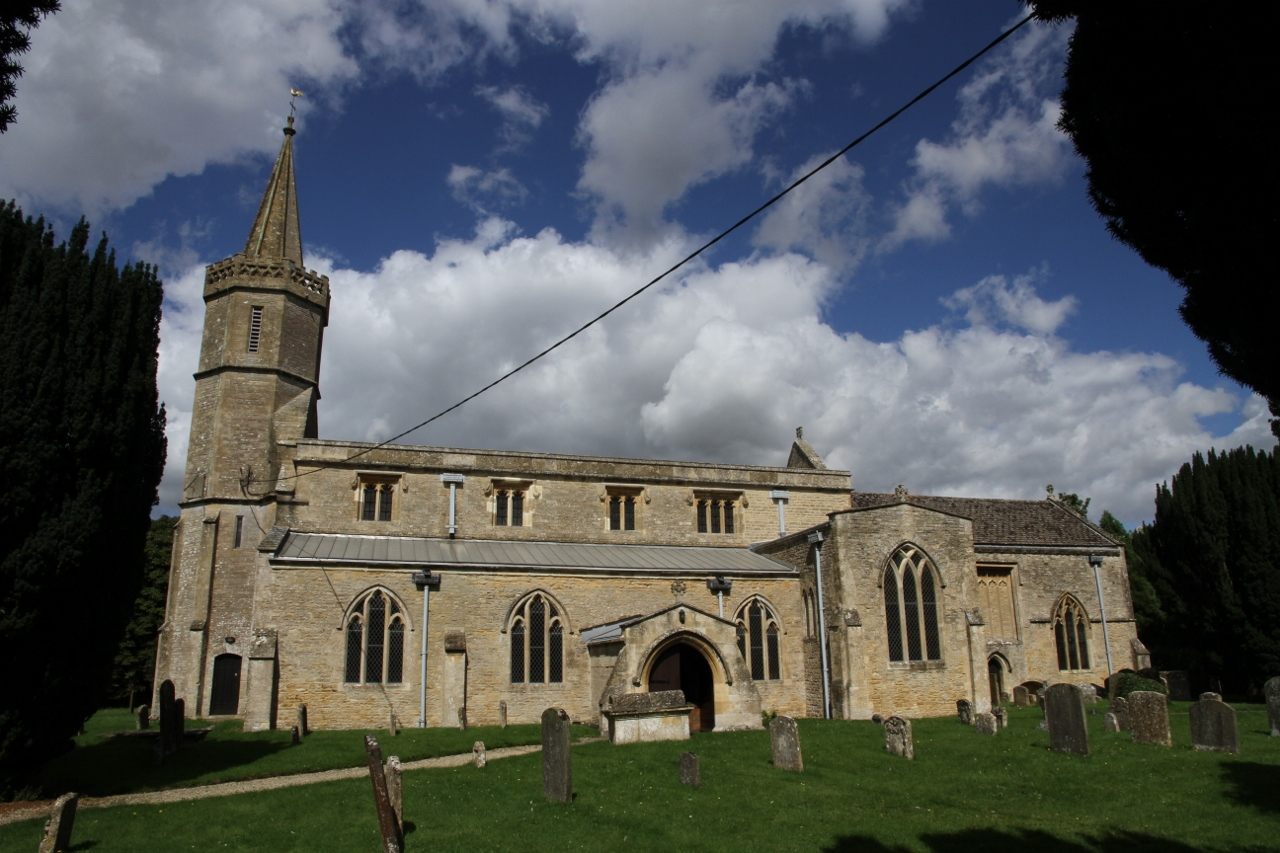
- St. Giles' parish church

- Location within Oxfordshire
- Population: 1,497 (parish, with Brighthampton) (2011 Census)
- OS grid reference: SP395035
- Civil parish: Standlake
- District: West Oxfordshire
- Shire county: Oxfordshire
- Region: South East
- Country: England
- Sovereign state: United Kingdom
- Post town: Witney
- Postcode district: OX29
- Dialling code: 01865
- Police: Thames Valley
- Fire: Oxfordshire
- Ambulance: South Central
- UK Parliament: Witney
- Website: Welcome to Standlake Oxfordshire

Standlake is a village and civil parish in West Oxfordshire about 5 miles (8 km) southeast of Witney and 7 miles (11 km) west of Oxford, England. The parish includes the hamlet of Brighthampton. The 2011 Census recorded the parish's population as 1,497. The River Windrush flows past the village and with its tributary Medley Brook it forms much of the eastern boundary of the parish. The western boundary has been subject to changes and disputes in past centuries. It now follows Brighthampton Cut, an artificial land drain dug in the 19th century. The Windrush joins the River Thames at Newbridge just over 1 mile (1.6 km) to the south.south.

== Archaeology ==
Palaeolithic axes have been found west of Standlake village and northeast of Brighthampton. Neolithic implements have been found north of Standlake village. Late Bronze Age urn burials have been found in ring ditches north of Brighthampton on Standlake Downs. Evidence of an extensive Iron Age settlement with round huts and storage pits has been found near the Bronze Age site. Sites have been found north and northeast of Standlake village where there were Roman settlements from the middle of the 1st century AD until late in the 2nd century. There was also a Roman settlement west of Standlake village. A large pagan burial ground from the 5th and 6th centuries has been found south of Malthouse Farm in Brighthampton. Burials from the 7th century have been found in the Bronze Age burial ground on Standlake Downs. Brighthampton was first recorded in 984 in the Saxon era, when it was part of the Royal manor of Bampton.

== Manor ==
12th-century documents record the toponym as Stanlache about 1155 and Stanlac in a pipe roll of 1194. The name is derived from Old English, meaning “stony lake”. Standlake emerged as a separate settlement in the middle of the 12th century. The Domesday Book records that in 1086 William FitzOsbern, 1st Earl of Hereford was the feudal overlord of a manor of six hides at Brighthampton. However, this is believed to be the manor that later became known as Standlake. In 1086 FitzOsbern's mesne lord was Anchetil de Greye, who also held Rotherfield Greys in South Oxfordshire. The mesne lordship remained with the de Greyes until 1192, when John de Greye died without a male heir and his holding Standlake passed to his daughter Eve. Eve's husband Ralph Murdac took part in a rebellion for which he was deprived of his landholdings in 1194, but after Ralph's death Richard I restored Standlake to Eve. When Eve died in 1242 the tenure of the manor was divided into quarters, which were not reunited until the 16th century.

By 1242 Baldwin de Redvers, 3rd Earl of Devon was the overlord of Standlake. When his heir Richard de Redvers, 4th Earl of Devon died in 1193, Standlake passed to the Crown. In 1355-56 Edward III granted Standlake to his daughter Isabella de Coucy. After her death, Richard II granted Standlake to William Montacute, 2nd Earl of Salisbury. Standlake belonged to John of Gaunt, 1st Duke of Lancaster by 1388 and was recorded as part of the Duchy of Lancaster until early in the 16th century. The main part of Standlake Manor House is a timber-framed house built in the 15th century. A chimney stack and a stone fireplace with heraldic decoration were inserted around 1600. The western bay of the medieval house was demolished at some time and only the central and eastern bays survive. A stone-built extension was added to the house in 1889.

== Churches ==
=== Church of England ===
The Church of England parish church of Saint Giles dates from the latter part of the 12th century. It was enlarged in the 13th and 14th centuries and underwent further alterations in about 1500. The Gothic Revival architect C.C. Rolfe restored the building between 1880 and 1891 and the spire was restored in 1911. The west tower has a ring of six bells. Henry III Bagley of Chacombe, Northamptonshire cast the second and third bells in 1709 and the fifth bell in 1710. William Taylor of Loughborough cast the tenor bell in 1843, presumably at the foundry he had at the time in Oxford. Mears and Stainbank of the Whitechapel Bell Foundry cast the treble bell in 1887 and the fourth bell in 1931. St Giles' also has a Sanctus bell that Thomas Rudhall of Gloucester cast in 1781.

The central range of St Giles' Rectory dates from at least 1246 and includes a lancet window from about 1300. The north range was added late in the 15th century, and a small south wing was added in 1661. Further alterations and additions were made in the 18th and 19th centuries, and dilapidated outbuildings including the parish's tithe barn were demolished. In 1980 the rectory was sold as a private house, and in restoration work in 1981 the new owners uncovered early 17th century wall paintings in an upstairs room over the hall. In the 15th century Standlake had a hermitage. After the English Reformation it became a cottage and was absorbed into Manor Farm. The building still existed in 1659 and may have been incorporated into later buildings, but if so it was demolished when the Manor House was extended in 1889.

=== Baptist ===
A few families of nonconformists were recorded in the parish in the latter part of the 17th century, and in the 18th century several local families were Anabaptists who attended a chapel in Cote. A Baptist chapel was built between Brighthampton and Standlake in 1832, flourished in the 1840s and 50s and a gallery was added to increase capacity in 1865. In the 20th century falling attendances led to services being discontinued in 1937, but they were resumed in 1951. The chapel finally closed in 1978 and in 1994 it was serving as the offices of a missionary society. It is now a private house.

=== Methodist ===
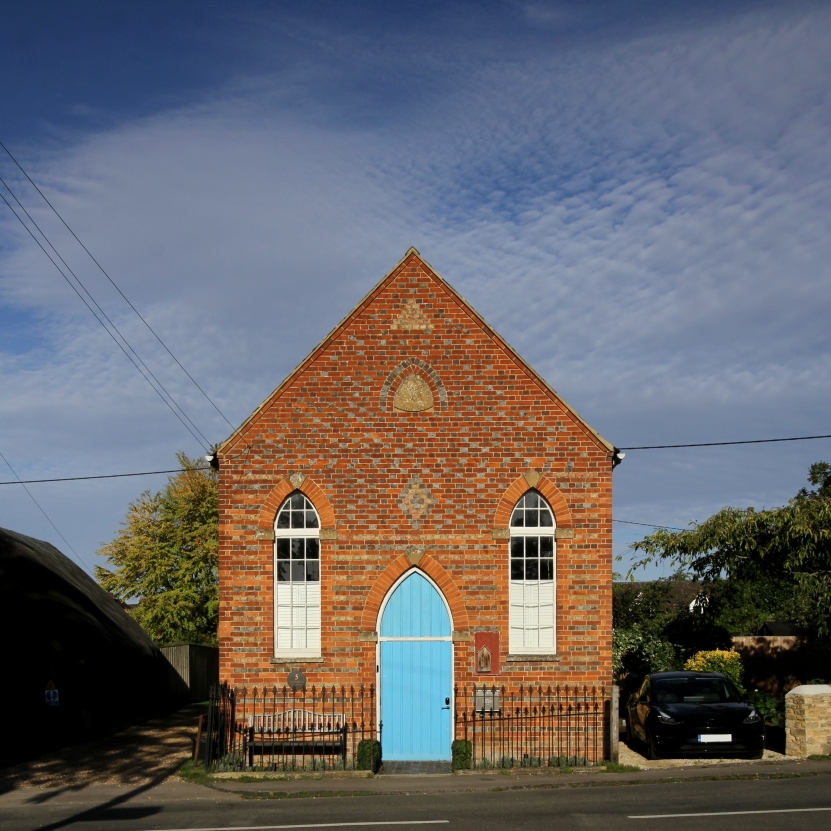
Former Primitive Methodist chapel

A Primitive Methodist chapel was built in 1864–65 and became a Methodist chapel in 1932. Sunday services ceased in 1970 and the chapel is now a private house.

== Historic houses ==
Gaunt House, a moated house 1/2 mile (800 m) east of Standlake village across the River Windrush, existed by the latter part of the 15th century. It is named after the family that owned it until 1516. In the English Civil War it belonged to Samuel Fell, Dean of Christ Church Cathedral, Oxford and was garrisoned by Royalist troops until the Parliamentarian Colonel Thomas Rainsborough besieged and captured it in May 1645. Thereafter it was garrisoned by Parliamentarian troops, including cavalry who raided Kidlington in October 1645 and infantry who fought at Radcot in April 1646. After Samuel Fell's death in 1649 Gaunt House passed first to his widow Margaret and then to his son John Fell, who was Bishop of Oxford from 1676. On his death in 1686 John Fell left Gaunt House to Christ Church, Oxford to provide an income to pay bursaries for poor students. It remained with Christ Church until it was sold 1955. Gaunt House was originally timber-framed but only a section of the original structure remains: all the rest having been replaced in stone by the early part of the 17th century.

Lincoln Cottage, near St. Giles' church, is a timber-framed cruck building dating from about 1500. Lincoln Farm house, formerly Tyrlings, is also a late medieval timber-framed building. It had a chimney stack inserted about 1564 and a stone-built second wing added before the end of the 16th century. At one time its tenant was Walter Bayley, who was physician to Elizabeth I and from 1561 until 1582 was Regius Professor of Physic at the University of Oxford. Cheswell Cottage was originally called Bodens. It is a timber framed thatched cottage dating from around 1550, with subsequent stone built in the 17th and 20th century additions. For parts of the 17th and 18th century it was owned by Lincoln College, Oxford.

== Economic history ==
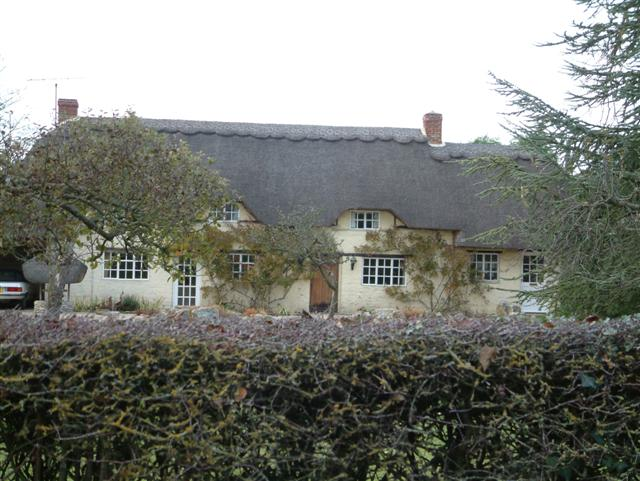
A thatched cottage in Standlake

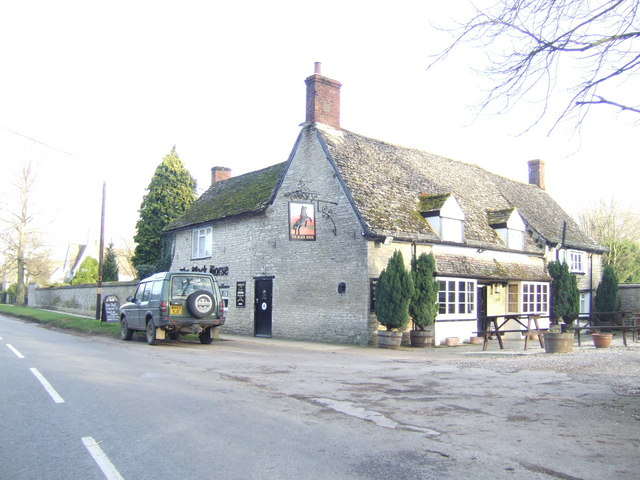
The Black Horse public house

The Domesday Book in 1086 recorded one watermill on the de Grey estate. By the 13th century the parish had five mills on the River Windrush of which two were fulling mills involved with west Oxfordshire's trade in wool. Weaving was a cottage industry in the parish until the middle of the 18th century. Gaunt Mill, about 400 yards (370 m) southwest of Gaunt House, was the "new mill" in the early part of the 13th century. It was a double mill with one part for corn and the other for fulling. From the early part of the 17th century it was purely a corn or gristmill. Magdalen College, Oxford acquired interests in Gaunt Mill in 1483 and 1538 and bought the mill outright in 1617. By 1883 the mill was in poor repair and by 1928 it was only in occasional use. Magdalen College sold the mill in 1920 and it was converted to private use in the 1940s and 1950s. Church Mill, about 250 yards (230 m) upstream of St. Giles' church, existed by 1279. It may have always been a corn mill, and in the 18th and 19th centuries it had a bakery. By 1636 Magdalen College had a half share in Church Mill. The mill was disused by 1911 but was repaired in the 1920s and generated electricity until 1968. During the Second World War it undertook some corn milling again. Early in the 1980s, the mill was restored and was still in working order in 2006.

In 1230 Standlake was licensed to hold a three-day market annually on St. Giles day and the days immediately before and after (31 August – 2 September). By 1279 the market had reduced to two days, and shortly thereafter it seems to have lapsed. By the latter part of the Middle Ages the main north–south route through the parish was that between Witney and Newbridge, which formed part of the main highway between London and Gloucestershire. Since the 1920s the Berinsfield - Abingdon - Witney stretch of this road has been classified as the A415. Aston Road, which links Brighthampton with Cote, was a bridleway until 1629, when it was made into a highway. It is now part of the B4449 road. An open field system of farming prevailed in the parish until 1853, when its common lands were enclosed.

By the early part of the 17th century Standlake had three or four public houses, including the Chequers, which traded until at least 1781. By the latter part of the 18th century Standlake had between seven and 11 pubs. The Black Horse is a 16th-century building that was a pub by 1761 and is now a gastropub. By 1790 The Bell had opened in Rack End, but by 1804 it had moved to the High Street to a building, part of which is timber-framed infilled with brick nogging, and the remainder of which is built of Cotswold stone. The Bell Inn was closed for refurbishment for some time after Greene King sold it in 2008, but reopened in August 2010 as a free house run by Few Inns. The Bell was damaged by a fire on 25 September 2015. It has not reopened and is now being redeveloped.

== Social history ==
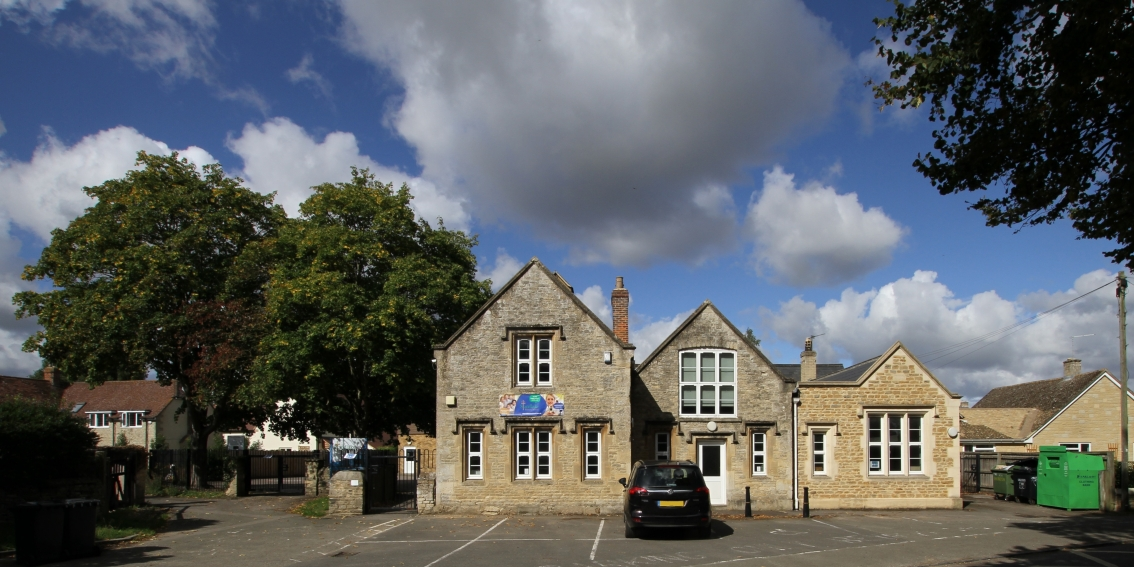
Standlake Church of England primary school

A school in Standlake was mentioned in 1672 and bequests to fund the education of Standlake were made in 1711 and 1721. Classes were held in St. Giles' church until 1846, when a schoolroom and schoolmaster's house were built on land given by Magdalen College. The building was enlarged in 1866, 1874 and 1894. In 1939 the school was reorganised as a junior and infants' school and in 1947 it became a Voluntary controlled school. The school was enlarged again in 1969 and continues to serve the parishes of Standlake and Northmoor.

Standlake had a lending library, established with the support of the Rector by 1877, and which continued intermittently until the 20th century. In 1924 it was superseded by a new library at the village school, which served the village until 1964 when it was succeeded by Oxfordshire County Council's mobile library service.In about 1921 a converted army hut was erected as Standlake's first village hall. It was replaced by the present community centre in 1989. In 1954 a second army hut was erected as a youth club. It was replaced by a purpose built club building in 1963. Longwood House on Abingdon Road was built in the 1920s. Barbara Dockar Drysdale founded the Mulberry Bush School for severely disturbed children at the house in 1948.

== Amenities ==
Standlake has a car repair garage, two camp sites and a Post Office and general store. There are various small to medium-sized businesses both within the village and on two light industrial parks in the parish. Standlake Arena is a locally owned and run 1/4-mile (400 m) oval racing circuit near Stanton Harcourt that hosts stock and banger car racing throughout the year. Oxford Downs Cricket Club has its ground at Standlake. It is a member of The Home Counties Premier Cricket League and The Cherwell Cricket League. The Standlake Players is an amateur theatrical society. Established in October 2007 by a group of villagers and other locals, the group has held productions in Standlake village hall. Standlake is surrounded by numerous artificial lakes dug for the commercial extraction of gravel. Many are now stocked with fish and popular with anglers; others are used for aquatic sports such as windsurfing.

Standlake is served by the 418 bus service connecting to major bus services in Eynsham and beyond with First & Last Mile community transport. The X15 connects Standlake with Witney and Oxford

== General and cited references ==
- Baggs, A. P.; Chance, Eleanor; Colvin, Christina; Day, C.J.; Selwyn, Nesta; Townley, Simon C. (1996). Crossley, Alan; Currie, C.R.J. (eds.). A History of the County of Oxford. Victoria County History. Vol. 13: Bampton Hundred (Part One). London: Oxford University Press for the Institute of Historical Research. pp. 197–203. ISBN 978-0-19722-790-9.
- Ekwall, Eilert (1960) [1936]. Concise Oxford Dictionary of English Place-Names (4th ed.). Oxford: Oxford University Press. Standlake. ISBN 0198691033.
- Sherwood, Jennifer; Pevsner, Nikolaus (1974). Oxfordshire. The Buildings of England. Harmondsworth: Penguin Books. pp. 776–778. ISBN 0-14-071045-0.
- Colvin, Christina; Cragoe, Carol; Ortenberg, Veronica; Peberdy, RB; Selwyn, Nesta; Williamson, Elizabeth (2006). Townley, Simon C. (ed.). A History of the County of Oxford. Victoria County History. Vol. 15: Carterton, Minster Lovell and Environs: Bampton Hundred (Part Three). Woodbridge: Boydell & Brewer for the Institute of Historical Research. pp. 171–205. ISBN 978-1-90435-606-6.
